= The Pips discography =

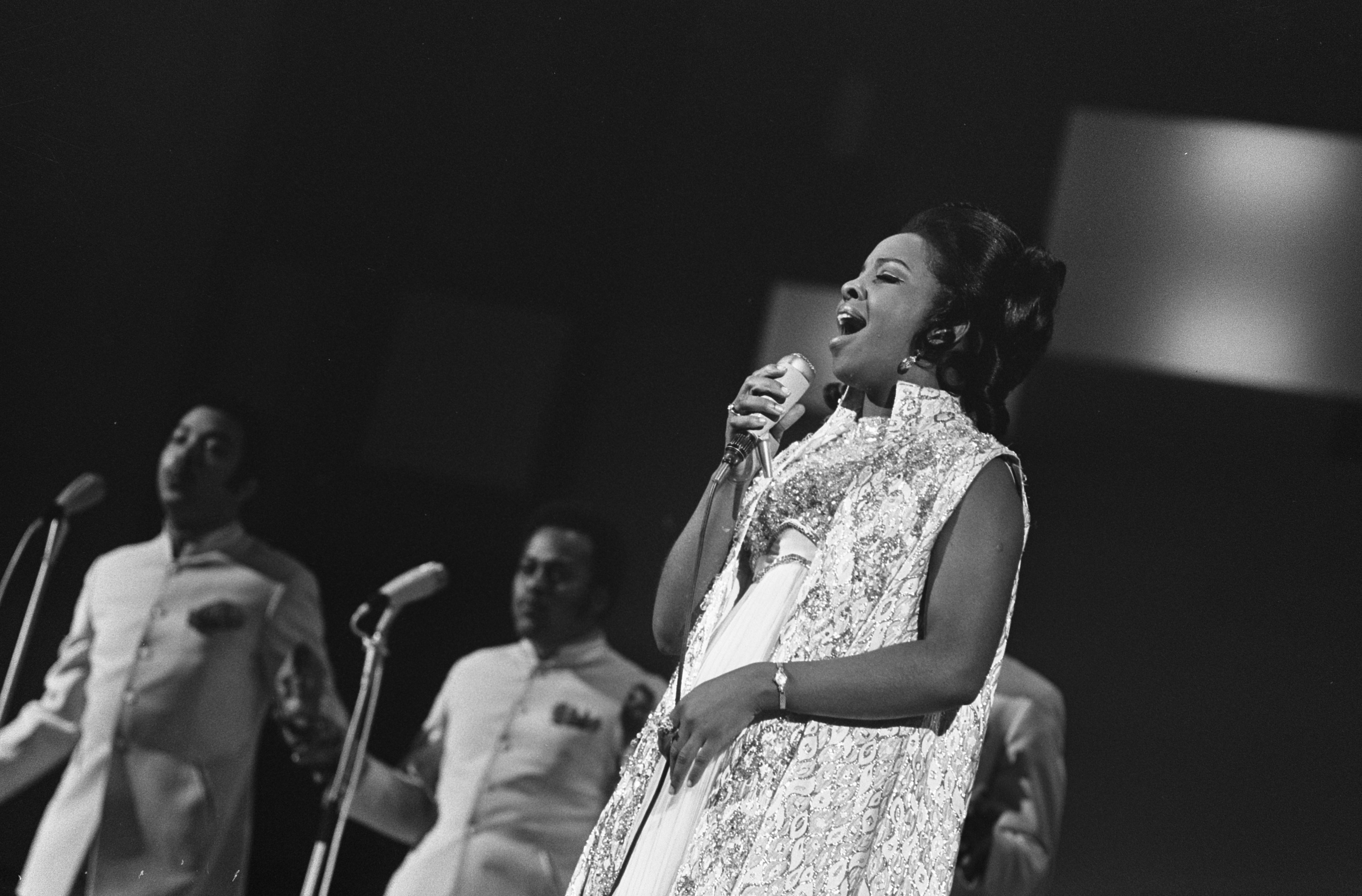
Gladys Knight & the Pips (1969)

Here is the discography of American R&B/soul vocal group Gladys Knight & the Pips.

== Albums ==
=== Studio albums ===
Year	Album	Peak chart positions					Certifications	Record label
Year	Album	US	US R&B	AUS	CAN	UK	Certifications	Record label
1962	Letter Full of Tears	—	—	—	—	—		Fury
1965	Gladys Knight and the Pips	—	—	—	—	—		Maxx
1967	Everybody Needs Love	60	12	—	—	—		Motown
1968	Feelin' Bluesy	158	12	—	—	—		Motown
1968	Silk N' Soul	136	11	—	—	—		Motown
1969	Nitty Gritty	81	11	—	—	—		Motown
1971	If I Were Your Woman	35	4	—	—	—		Motown
1971	Standing Ovation	60	11	—	—	—		Motown
1973	Neither One of Us	9	1	—	—	—		Motown
1973	All I Need Is Time	70	14	—	—	—		Motown
1973	Imagination	9	1	27	22	—	RIAA: Gold; MC: Gold	Buddah
1974	Knight Time	139	29	—	—	—		Soul
1974	I Feel a Song	17	1	24	16	20	RIAA: Gold; BPI: Silver	Buddah
1975	A Little Knight Music	164	32	—	—	—		Soul
1975	2nd Anniversary	24	4	—	91	—	RIAA: Gold	Buddah
1975	Bless This House	—	—	—	—	—		Buddah
1977	Still Together	51	18	—	—	42		Buddah
1978	The One and Only	145	30	—	—	—		Buddah
1980	About Love	48	5	—	—	—		Columbia
1980	That Special Time of Year	—	45	—	—	—		Columbia
1981	Touch	109	22	—	—	—		Columbia
1983	Visions	34	3	—	—	—	RIAA: Gold	Columbia
1985	Life	126	31	—	—	—		Columbia
1987	All Our Love	39	1	—	—	80	RIAA: Gold	MCA
"—" denotes a recording that did not chart or was not released in that territory.

=== Live albums ===
Year	Album	Peak chart positions		Record label
Year	Album	US	US R&B	Record label
1970	All in a Knight's Work	—	—	Soul
1996	The Lost Live Album	—	—	Buddha
1998	Live at the Roxy	—	—	Legacy
"—" denotes the release failed to chart

=== Soundtrack albums ===
Year	Album	Peak chart positions				Certifications	Record label
Year	Album	US	US R&B	AUS	CAN	Certifications	Record label
1974	Claudine	35	1	—	27	RIAA: Gold	Buddah
1976	Pipe Dreams	94	16	23	—		Buddah
"—" denotes a recording that did not chart or was not released in that territory.

=== Compilation albums ===
Year	Album	Peak chart positions				Certifications	Record label
Year	Album	US	US R&B	CAN	UK	Certifications	Record label
1970	Greatest Hits	55	5	—	—		Soul
1974	Anthology	77	10	—	—		Motown
1976	The Best of Gladys Knight & the Pips	36	8	35	6	BPI: Gold	Buddah
1977	30 Greatest Hits	—	—	—	3	BPI: Platinum	K-tel
1980	The Touch of Love	—	—	—	16	BPI: Silver	K-tel
1984	The Collection	—	—	—	43		Castle
1988	The Best of Gladys Knight & the Pips: Columbia Years	—	—	—	—		Columbia
1989	The Singles Album	—	—	—	12	BPI: Gold	PolyGram
1990	Greatest Hits	—	—	—	—	RIAA: Gold	Curb
1990	Soul Survivors: The Best of Gladys Knight & the Pips 1973-1988	—	—	—	—		Rhino
1995	The Best Of (Anthology Series)	—	—	—	—		Motown
1997	The Ultimate Collection	—	—	—	—		Motown
1999	Essential Collection	—	—	—	—		Hip-O
2000	Classic: The Universal Master Collection	—	—	—	—		Motown
2003	Platinum & Gold Collection	—	—	—	—		BMG Heritage
2005	Love Songs	—	—	—	—		Sony BMG
2006	The Greatest Hits	—	—	—	52	BPI: Silver	Sony BMG
2006	Gold	—	53	—	—		Hip-O
2006	Beautiful Ballads	—	—	—	—		Legacy
2007	Love Finds Its Own Way: The Best of Gladys Knight & the Pips	—	—	—	—		Legacy
2008	The Definitive Collection	—	—	—	—		Motown
2009	Playlist: The Very Best of Gladys Knight & the Pips	—	—	—	—		Legacy
"—" denotes a recording that did not chart or was not released in that territory.

== Singles ==
=== The early years (1958–1965) ===
Year	Single	Peak chart positions				Album
Year	Single	US	US R&B	AUS	CAN	Album
1958	"Whistle My Love" ^{[A]} b/w "Ching Chong"	—	—	—	—	Non-album tracks
1961	"Every Beat of My Heart" ^{[A]} b/w "Room in Your Heart"	6	1	75	20	Non-album tracks
1961	"Every Beat of My Heart" b/w "Room in Your Heart"; Re-recorded versions	45	15	—	—	Letter Full of Tears
1961	"Guess Who" b/w "Stop Running Around"	—	—	—	—	Letter Full of Tears
1961	"Letter Full of Tears" b/w "You Broke Your Promise"	19	3	—	—	Letter Full of Tears
1962	"Operator" b/w "I'll Trust in You"	97	—	—	—	Letter Full of Tears
1962	"Linda"^{[B]} b/w "Darling" (from Letter Full of Tears)	—	—	—	—	Non-album tracks
1963	"Happiness (Is the Light of Love)" b/w "I Had a Dream Last Night"	—	—	—	—	Non-album tracks
1963	"Come See About Me"^{[C]} b/w "I Want That Kind of Love"	—	—	—	—	Non-album tracks
1963	"Queen of Tears"^{[D]} b/w "A Love Like Mine"	—	—	—	—	Non-album tracks
1964	"Giving Up" b/w "Maybe Maybe Baby"	38	6^{[E]}	—	—	Gladys Knight and the Pips
1964	"What Shall I Do" b/w "Love Call"	—	—	—	—	Non-album tracks
1964	"Lovers Always Forgive" b/w "(There Will Never Be) Another Love"	89	—	—	42	Gladys Knight and the Pips
1964	"Either Way I Lose" b/w "Go Away, Stay Away"	119	—	—	—	Gladys Knight and the Pips
1965	"Stop and Get a Hold of Myself"	123	—	—	—	Gladys Knight and the Pips
1965	b/w "Who Knows? (I Just Can't Trust You)"	129	—	—	—	Gladys Knight and the Pips
1965	"Tell Her You're Mine" b/w "If I Should Fall In Love"	—	—	—	—	Gladys Knight and the Pips
"—" denotes a recording that did not chart or was not released in that territory.

Notes

- ^{A} Single credited to The Pips but nonetheless featuring Gladys Knight; the group's name change to Gladys Knight & the Pips hadn't taken place yet
- ^{B} Recording by The Pips alone without Gladys Knight
- ^{C} Single credited to Gladys Knight alone; may be a solo recording
- ^{D} Single credited to Gladys Knight with "vocal background by the Pips"
- ^{E} From November 30, 1963, to January 23, 1965, Billboard Magazine did not publish a Hot R&B songs chart; the peak positions for R&B singles listed during this period are from Cash Box Magazine.

=== The Soul (Motown) era (1966–1972) ===
Year	Single (A-side, B-side) Both sides from same album except where indicated	Peak chart positions						Album
Year	Single (A-side, B-side) Both sides from same album except where indicated	US	US R&B	US A/C	AUS	CAN	UK	Album
1966	"Just Walk in My Shoes" b/w "Stepping Closer to Your Heart" (from Anthology)	129	—	—	—	—	35	Everybody Needs Love
1967	"Take Me in Your Arms and Love Me" b/w "Do You Love Me Just a Little, Honey"	98	—	—	—	—	13	Everybody Needs Love
1967	"Everybody Needs Love" b/w "Stepping Closer to Your Heart" (from Anthology)	39	3	—	—	33	—	Everybody Needs Love
1967	"I Heard It Through the Grapevine" b/w "It's Time to Go Now" (from Feelin' Bluesy)	2	1	—	—	5	47	Everybody Needs Love
1968	"The End of Our Road" b/w "Don't Let Her Take Your Love from Me"	15	5	—	—	12	—	Feelin' Bluesy
1968	"It Should Have Been Me" b/w "You Don't Love Me No More" (from Everybody Needs Love)	40	9	—	—	33	—	Feelin' Bluesy
1968	"I Wish It Would Rain" b/w "It's Summer" (from Nitty Gritty)	41	15	—	—	60	—	Silk N' Soul
1969	"Didn't You Know (You'd Have to Cry Sometime)" b/w "Keep an Eye"	63	11	—	—	67	—	Nitty Gritty
1969	"The Nitty Gritty" b/w "Got Myself a Good Man"	19	2	—	—	27	—	Nitty Gritty
1969	"Friendship Train" b/w "Cloud Nine" (from Nitty Gritty)	17	2	—	—	29	—	Greatest Hits
1970	"You Need Love Like I Do (Don't You)" b/w "You're My Everything" (from Silk N' Soul)	25	3	—	—	35	—	Greatest Hits
1970	"If I Were Your Woman" b/w "The Tracks of My Tears" (from Silk N' Soul)	9	1	—	99	23	—	If I Were Your Woman
1971	"I Don't Want to Do Wrong" b/w "Is There a Place (In His Heart for Me)"	17	2	—	—	30	—	If I Were Your Woman
1971	"Make Me the Woman That You Go Home To" b/w "It's All Over but the Shoutin'" (from Knight Time)	27	3	—	—	67	—	Standing Ovation
1972	"Help Me Make It Through the Night" b/w "If You Gonna Leave (Just Leave)"	33	13	25	—	64	11	Standing Ovation
1972	"Neither One of Us (Wants to Be the First to Say Goodbye)" b/w "Can't Give It Up No More"	2	1	15	—	16	31	Neither One of Us
The following singles were released after the group left Motown
1973	"The Look of Love" b/w "You're My Everything"	—	—	—	—	—	21	Silk N' Soul
1973	"Daddy Could Swear, I Declare" b/w "For Once in My Life"	19	2	—	—	45	—	Neither One of Us
1973	"All I Need Is Time" b/w "The Only Time You Love Me Is When You're Losing Me"	61	28	—	—	—	—	All I Need Is Time
1974	"Between Her Goodbye and My Hello" b/w "This Child Needs Its Father" (from Neither One Of Us)	57	45	—	—	81	—	Knight Time
"—" denotes a recording that did not chart or was not released in that territory.

=== The Buddah era (1973–1978) ===
Year	Single (A-side, B-side) Both sides from same album except where indicated	Peak chart positions						Certifications	Album
Year	Single (A-side, B-side) Both sides from same album except where indicated	US	US R&B	US A/C	AUS	CAN	UK	Certifications	Album
1973	"Where Peaceful Waters Flow" b/w "Perfect Love"	28	6	18	—	—	—		Imagination
1973	"Midnight Train to Georgia" b/w "Window Raising Granny"	1	1	19	52	5	10	RIAA: Gold; BPI: Platinum	Imagination
1973	"I've Got to Use My Imagination" b/w "I Can See Clearly Now"	4	1	—	—	25	—	RIAA: Gold	Imagination
1974	"Best Thing That Ever Happened to Me" b/w "Once in a Lifetime Thing"	3	1	10	46	6	7	RIAA: Gold	Imagination
1974	"On and On" b/w "The Makings of You"	5	2	—	—	13	—	RIAA: Gold	"Claudine" soundtrack
1974	"I Feel a Song (In My Heart)" /	21	1	—	39	13	—		I Feel a Song
1974	"Don't Burn Down the Bridge"	21	—	—	—	—	—		I Feel a Song
1975	"Love Finds Its Own Way" b/w "Better You Go Your Way"	47	3	40	—	60	—		I Feel a Song
1975	"The Way We Were" / "Try to Remember" b/w "The Need to Be"	11	6	2	43	29	4	BPI: Silver	I Feel a Song
1975	"Money" b/w "Street Brother"	50	4	—	—	57	—		2nd Anniversary
1975	"Part Time Love" b/w "Where Do I Put His Memory"	22	4	17	—	34	30		2nd Anniversary
1975	"Silent Night" b/w "Do You Hear What I Hear"	—	—	—	—	—	—		Bless This House
1976	"Make Yours a Happy Home" b/w "The Going Ups and the Coming Downs" (from I Feel A Song)	—	13	—	—	—	35		"Claudine" soundtrack
1976	"So Sad the Song" b/w Instrumental theme of A-side	47	12	3	13	—	20		"Pipe Dreams" soundtrack
1977	"Nobody But You" b/w "Pipe Dreams"	—	—	—	—	—	34		"Pipe Dreams" soundtrack
1977	"Baby, Don't Change Your Mind" b/w "I Love to Feel That Feeling"	52	10	—	—	58	4	BPI: Silver	Still Together
1977	"Home Is Where the Heart Is" b/w "You Put a New Life in My Body"	—	—	—	—	—	35		Still Together
1977	"Sorry Doesn't Always Make It Right" b/w "You Put a New Life in My Body" (from Still Together)	—	24	—	—	—	—		The One and Only
1978	"The One and Only" b/w "Pipe Dreams" (from "Pipe Dreams" soundtrack)	—	40	—	—	—	32		The One and Only
1978	"Come Back and Finish What You Started" b/w "It's Up to You (Do What You Do)" (from Spotlight On Gladys Knight & The Pips)	—	—	—	—	—	15		The One and Only
1978	"It's a Better Than Good Time" b/w "Everybody's Got to Find a Way" (from Spotlight On Gladys Knight & The Pips)	—	16	—	—	—	59		The One and Only
"—" denotes a recording that did not chart or was not released in that territory.

=== The later years (1980–1988) ===
Year	Single	Peak chart positions					Album
Year	Single	US	US R&B	US A/C	CAN	UK	Album
1980	"Landlord"	46	3	—	—	—	About Love
1980	"Taste of Bitter Love"	—	38	—	—	35	About Love
1980	"Bourgie', Bourgie'"	—	45	—	—	32	About Love
1981	"Forever Yesterday (For the Children)"	—	52	—	—	—	—N/a
1981	"If That'll Make You Happy"	—	37	—	—	—	Touch
1981	"I Will Fight"	—	21	—	—	—	Touch
1982	"A Friend of Mine"	—	50	—	—	—	Touch
1982	"That Special Time of Year"	—	32	—	—	—	That Special Time of Year
1983	"Save the Overtime (For Me)"	66	1	—	—	—	Visions
1983	"You're Number One (In My Book)"	—	5	—	—	—	Visions
1983	"Hero"	104	64	23	—	—	Visions
1984	"When You're Far Away"	—	42	—	—	—	Visions
1985	"My Time"	102	16	—	—	—	Life
1985	"Keep Givin' Me Love"	—	31	—	—	—	Life
1985	"Till I See You Again"	—	85	—	—	—	Life
1986	"Send It to Me"	—	14	—	—	—	"Miami Vice II" soundtrack
1987	"Love Overboard"	13	1	45	59	42	All Our Love
1988	"Lovin' on Next to Nothin'"	—	3	—	—	81	All Our Love
1988	"It's Gonna Take All Our Love"	—	29	—	—	—	All Our Love
"—" denotes a recording that did not chart or was not released in that territory.

== Other appearances ==
Year	Song	Album
1994	"Midnight Train to Georgia" (live version)	Grammy's Greatest Moments Volume IV

== The Pips ==
- Listed below are recordings made without Gladys Knight.

=== Studio albums ===
Year	Album	Peak chart positions		Record label
Year	Album	US	US R&B	Record label
1977	At Last… The Pips	—	—	Casablanca
1978	Callin'	—	—	Casablanca
"—" denotes the release failed to chart

=== Singles ===
Year	Single	Peak chart positions	
Year	Single	US	US R&B
1962	"Linda"	—	—
1963	"Happiness (Is the Light of Love)"	—	—
1977	"If I Could Bring Back Yesterday"	—	—
1978	"Baby I'm Your Fool"	—	—
"—" denotes the release failed to chart
