= The Ultimate Collection (Gladys Knight and The Pips album) =

Compilation album by Gladys Knight and The Pips
- Released: October 7, 1997
- Recorded: 1966–1974
- Genre: Soul music
- Length: 74:01
- Label: Motown Records
- Producer: Harry Weinger

Gladys Knight and The Pips chronology
Anthology (version 3) (1995)	The Ultimate Collection (1997)	Essential Collection (1999)

Professional ratings
Review scores
Source	Rating
Allmusic	4.5/5 stars

The Ultimate Collection is a compact disc by Gladys Knight and The Pips, released on Motown Records, catalogue MOTD 0826, in October 1997. It is a collection of singles comprising many of the group's greatest hits, with liner notes written by Ruth Adkins Robinson.

== Content ==
The disc contains all 19 singles released by Gladys Knight and the Pips on the Soul Records imprint of Motown; a 20th single, "The Look of Love," was released in the United Kingdom only and is not included here. All charted on the Billboard Hot 100 except for the first, "Just Walk in My Shoes"; 13 hit the Top 40 and twelve made the top ten on the rhythm and blues singles chart. "It's Time to Go Now" is the b-side of "I Heard It Through the Grapevine," their version released a year before that by Marvin Gaye. The song "Here I Am Again," already issued on the If I Were Your Woman album of 1971, was initially slated to be a single, Soul 35111 for a November 1973 release date. It was withdrawn, with that single designation going to "Between Her Goodbye and My Hello." One track, their cover of "Every Little Bit Hurts" previously done by fellow Motown artist Brenda Holloway, appeared on an album of cover songs from 1968, Silk 'n' Soul. This compilation disc was part of an "Ultimate Collection" series issued that year by Motown for many of their top-selling classic artists.

Starting in the late 1960s and early 1970s, standard industry practice shifted to a focus on album sales, where a single became less a separate entity and more simply an advertisement for an LP, and a lead single would be pulled off an album as a promotional tool. Prior to this, singles were concentrated upon as a profitable commodity, especially for smaller record labels, and albums were often built around already successful singles. Since Motown fixated on the hit single until the very end of its stay in Detroit, single versions of songs often featured different mixes than versions that would be later placed on albums. Singles were usually mixed "punchier" and "hotter" to sound better on car radios receiving AM broadcast. The single versions are the ones appearing here.

== Personnel ==
- Gladys Knight — lead vocals
- Merald "Bubba" Knight — vocals
- Edward Patten — vocals
- William Guest — vocals
- The Funk Brothers — instruments tracks 1–18, 22
- Members of the Detroit Symphony Orchestra conducted by Gordon Staples — strings

== Track listing ==
Singles chart peak positions from Billboard charts; Soul 35023 marked with asterisk bubbled under at position #129 on the Billboard Hot 100.

Track	Catalogue	Release date	Pop Chart	R&B Chart	Song title	Writer(s)	Time
1.	Soul 35039	9/14/67	#2	#1	"I Heard It Through the Grapevine"	Norman Whitfield, Barrett Strong	2:53
2.	Soul 35042	1/25/68	#15	#5	"The End of Our Road"	Norman Whitfield, Barrett Strong, Roger Penzabene	2:21
3.	Soul 35034	6/12/67	#39	#3	"Everybody Needs Love"	Edward Holland, Jr., Norman Whitfield	2:56
4.	Soul 35033	3/16/67	#98		"Take Me in Your Arms and Love Me"	Barrett Strong, Roger Penzabene, Cornelius Grant	2:55
5.	Soul 35045	5/16/68	#40	#9	"It Should Have Been Me"	Norman Whitfield, Mickey Stevenson	2:58
6.	Soul 35047	8/8/68	#41	#15	"I Wish It Would Rain"	Norman Whitfield, Barrett Strong, Roger Penzabene	2:54
7.	Soul SS711	1/68			"Every Little Bit Hurts"	Ed Cobb	3:03
8.	Soul 35057	2/13/69	#63	#11	"Didn't You Know (You Have to Cry Sometime)	Nickolas Ashford, Valerie Simpson	3:33
9.	Soul 35023	6/7/66	*		"Just Walk in My Shoes"	Helen Lewis, Kay Lewis	2:47
10.	Soul 35063	5/25/69	#19	#2	"The Nitty Gritty"	Lincoln Chase	3:01
11.	Soul 35068	10/6/69	#17	#2	"Friendship Train"	Norman Whitfield, Barrett Strong	3:45
12.	Soul 35071	3/3/70	#25	#3	"You Need Love Like I Do (Don't You?)"	Norman Whitfield, Barrett Strong	3:35
13.	Soul 35078	10/29/70	#9	#1	"If I Were Your Woman"	Gloria Jones, Pamela Sawyer, Clay McMurray	3:12
14.	Soul 35083	5/6/71	#17	#2	"I Don't Want to Do Wrong"	Johnny Bristol, Gladys Knight, William Guest; Merald "Bubba" Knight, Katherine Schaffner	3:22
15.	Soul SS731	2/71			"Here I Am Again"	Clay McMurray, Patricia Foster	3:39
16.	Soul 35091	11/18/71	#27	#3	"Make Me the Woman That You Go Home To"	Clay McMurray	3:45
17.	Soul 35094	3/6/72	#33	#13	"Help Me Make It Through the Night"	Kris Kristofferson	4:19
18.	Soul 35098	12/26/72	#2	#1	"Neither One of Us (Wants to Be the First to Say Goodbye)"	Jim Weatherly	4:21
19.	Soul 35105	4/9/73	#19	#2	"Daddy Could Swear I Declare"	Johnny Bristol, Gladys Knight, Merald "Bubba" Knight	3:43
20.	Soul 35107	7/10/73	#61	#28	"All I Need Is Time"	Bud Runeau	3:22
21.	Soul 35111	5/24/74	#57	#45	"Between Her Goodbye and My Hello"	Jim Weatherly	3:50
22.	Soul 35039b	9/14/67			"It's Time to Go Now"	Norman Whitfield, Barrett Strong	2:42
