= Gladys Knight and the Pips (album) =

Gladys Knight & the Pips

Studio album by Gladys Knight & the Pips
- Released: 1965
- Recorded: Atlanta
- Genre: Soul
- Label: Maxx Records
- Producer: Larry Maxwell, Van McCoy

Gladys Knight & the Pips chronology
Letter Full of Tears (1962)	Gladys Knight & the Pips (1965)	Everybody Needs Love (1967)

Professional ratings
Review scores
Source	Rating
AllMusic	3/5 stars

Gladys Knight & The Pips is the second studio album by Gladys Knight & the Pips, released on the Maxx Records label in 1965, before the group was signed by Motown Records. Maxx Records was established by Larry Maxwell of Riverside Records, and this album was the first record to be produced by him on the Maxx label.

The songs "Giving Up" (a "moderate hit"), Lovers Always Forgive", "(There Will Never Be) Another Love", "Go Away, Stay Away", "Stop and Get a Hold of Myself", "Who Knows?" and "Tell Her You're Mine" were released as singles. The song "Lovers Always Forgive" was noted by Billboard in "Regional Breakouts".

== Track listing ==
Side one
No.	Title	Length
1.	"Giving Up"	2:56
2.	"Either Way I Lose"	2:38
3.	"Another Love"	2:42
4.	"Lovers Always Forgive"	2:36
5.	"Daybreak"	2:34
6.	"If I Ever Should Fall In Love"	1:57

Side two
No.	Title	Length
7.	"Tell Her You're Mine"	2:34
8.	"Why Don't You Love Me"	2:34
9.	"Maybe Maybe Baby"	3:37
10.	"Who Knows"	2:37
11.	"Go Away, Stay Away"	2:41
12.	"Stop & Get A Hold Of Myself"	2:45

== Personnel ==
- Gladys Knight - lead vocals
- Merald "Bubba" Knight, William Guest, Edward Patten - backing vocals
