= If I Were Your Woman =

If I Were Your Woman may refer to:

- If I Were Your Woman (Gladys Knight & the Pips album), a 1971 album by Gladys Knight & the Pips
- "If I Were Your Woman" (song), a 1970 song by Gladys Knight & the Pips
- If I Were Your Woman (Stephanie Mills album), 1987
