= Neither One of Us =

Neither One of Us may refer to:

- "Neither One of Us (Wants to Be the First to Say Goodbye)", a 1973 song by Gladys Knight & the Pips
- Neither One of Us (album), a 1973 album by Gladys Knight & the Pips
