= I Feel a Song =

1974 studio album by Gladys Knight & the Pips

Studio album by Gladys Knight & the Pips
- Released: November 1974
- Recorded: 1974
- Genre: Soul
- Length: 34:44
- Label: Buddah; 5612
- Producer: Tony Camillo, Kenny Kerner, Richie Wise, Burt Bacharach, Ralph Moss, Bill Withers, Gladys Knight, Bubba Knight, William Guest, Edward Patten

Gladys Knight & the Pips chronology
Claudine (1974)	I Feel a Song (1974)	Knight Time (1974)

Professional ratings
Review scores
Source	Rating
AllMusic	3/5 stars
Christgau's Record Guide	B+
Rolling Stone	(mixed)

I Feel a Song is the thirteenth studio album recorded by American R&B group Gladys Knight & the Pips, released in November 1974 on the Buddah label. It was their third overall album for Buddah.

The first single release, "I Feel a Song (In My Heart)", reached number 1 R&B and number 21 on the Billboard Hot 100. The B-side, "Don't Burn Down the Bridge", also charted as a tag-along on the pop chart. A second single, "Love Finds Its Own Way", also charted, peaking at number 47 pop and number 3 R&B. The final single, a live medley recording of "The Way We Were"/"Try to Remember" was also a successful hit, peaking at number 11 pop and number 6 R&B. The song also gave the group its highest chart peaks on the adult contemporary and UK Singles charts, number 2 and number 4, respectively. The album was also the group's fourth of five R&B albums chart-toppers.

== Track listing ==
Side one
No.	Title	Writer(s)	Length
1.	"I Feel a Song (In My Heart)"	Tony Camillo, Mary Sawyer	2:48
2.	"Love Finds Its Own Way"	Jim Weatherly	3:56
3.	"Seconds"	Neil Simon, Burt Bacharach,	3:48
4.	"The Going Ups and the Coming Downs"	Jim Weatherly	3:35
5.	"The Way We Were / Try to Remember" (Live Medley)	Marvin Hamlisch, Alan & Marilyn Bergman / Harvey Schmidt, Tom Jones	4:30

Side two
No.	Title	Writer(s)	Length
1.	"Better You Go Your Way"	Bill Withers	4:15
2.	"Don't Burn Down the Bridge"	Ronnie Miller	4:47
3.	"The Need to Be"	Jim Weatherly	4:07
4.	"Tenderness Is His Way"	Bill Withers	2:58

== Charts ==
Chart (1974)	Peak
Australia (Kent Music Report)	24
U.S. Billboard Top LPs	17
U.S. Billboard Top Soul LPs	1
UK Albums Chart	20

Singles

Year	Single	Chart positions			
Year	Single	US	US R&B	US A/C	UK
1974	"I Feel a Song" (A-side)	21	1	—	—
1974	"Don't Burn Down the Bridge" (B-side)	21	—	—	—
1975	"Love Finds Its Own Way"	47	3	40	—
1975	"The Way We Were"/"Try to Remember" (live medley)	11	6	2	4

== See also ==
- List of number-one R&B albums of 1974 (U.S.)
