= Everybody Needs Love =

Everybody Needs Love may refer to:

- Everybody Needs Love (album), a 1967 album by Gladys Knight & the Pips
- "Everybody Needs Love" (Marvin Gaye song), 1978
- "Everybody Needs Love" (Stephen Bishop song), 1978, from Bish
- "Everybody Needs Love" (The Temptations song), 1965, covered by Gladys Knight & the Pips
- "Everybody Needs Love", a 1997 song by Seven Day Jesus from the album Seven Day Jesus
