= All Our Love =

Studio album by Gladys Knight & the Pips
- Released: 1987
- Genre: Soul
- Length: 55:50
- Label: MCA
- Producer: Reggie Calloway and Vincent Calloway (Track 1); Howie Rice (Tracks 2, 3 & 7); Alex Brown (Tracks 4 & 10); Ron Kersey (Tracks 4, 8 & 10); Nick Martinelli (Tracks 5 & 6); Sam Dees (Track 8); Burt Bacharach and Carole Bayer Sager (Tracks 9 & 11)

Gladys Knight & the Pips chronology
Life (1985)	All Our Love (1987)

All Our Love is an album by the soul quartet Gladys Knight & the Pips, released in 1987. It was the group's last studio album before the Pips retired and Knight embarked on a solo career.

The album peaked at No. 39 on the Billboard 200. It was the quartet's sixth gold album.

== Production ==
Carole Bayer Sager and Burt Bacharach wrote and produced two tracks on the album.

== Critical reception ==
Professional ratings
Review scores
Source	Rating
AllMusic	3/5 stars
Robert Christgau	B+
The Encyclopedia of Popular Music	3/5 stars
The Philadelphia Inquirer	3/4 stars
The Rolling Stone Album Guide	3/5 stars

AllMusic wrote that "most of the time, All Our Love sounds fairly organic rather than forced or contrived ... Sometimes excellent and sometimes merely decent, the album falls short of essential." Robert Christgau thought that "Knight has one of those burgundy voices, designed to age, and since her albums have rarely done it justice, the edgy writing and overall strength of this multiproducer soul-dance-pop-whatever comeback is a gift." Ebony wrote that "soaring above all that modern production is the unmistakable Gladys Knight alto." The New York Times wrote: "Having landed on MCA, the venerable pop-soul vocal group has made an album that subtly updates its sound without tampering with a basic recipe in which the Pips' voices punctuate and curl around Gladys Knight's warm dusky alto."

== Track listing ==
1. "Love Overboard" (Reggie Calloway) – 5:26
2. "Lovin' on Next to Nothin'" (Jeff Pescetto, Howie Rice, Alan Rich) – 6:09
3. "Thief in Paradise" (Nan O'Byrne, Tom Snow) – 5:05
4. "You" (Alex Brown, Ron Kersey) – 5:00
5. "Let Me Be the One" (Joe Jefferson, Rosa Jefferson) – 4:39
6. "Complete Recovery" (Anne Godwin, Ian Prince) – 4:35
7. "Say What You Mean" (Michael Gaffey, Peter Glenister) – 5:19
8. "It's Gonna Take All Our Love" (Sam Dees) – 5:24
9. "Love Is Fire (Love Is Ice)" (Burt Bacharach, Carole Bayer Sager) – 4:37
10. "Point of View" (Alan Brown, Robin Smith) – 4:19
11. "Overnight Success" (Burt Bacharach, Carole Bayer Sager) – 4:56

== Personnel ==
The Pips

- Gladys Knight – lead vocals
- William Guest – vocals
- Bubba Knight – vocals
- Edward Patten – vocals

Musicians

- George Duke – acoustic piano (1)
- Joel Davis – keyboards (1)
- David Ervin – additional keyboards (1)
- Jeff Lorber – keyboards (2), drums (2)
- Howie Rice – instruments (2, 7), keyboards (3), guitars (3), drum programming (3)
- Elliot Wolff – synthesizers (3), drum programming (3)
- Ron Kersey – keyboards (4, 8, 10), arrangements (4, 10)
- Randy Cantor – keyboards (5, 6), synthesizers (5, 6), rhythm arrangements (5)
- Billy Preston – keyboards (6), synthesizers (6)
- Donald Robinson – keyboards (6), synthesizers (6)
- Sam Dees – keyboards (8), backing vocals (8)
- Burt Bacharach – synthesizers (9), string arrangements (11)
- Robbie Buchanan – synthesizers (9, 11)
- David Foster – synthesizers (9)
- Randy Kerber – DX7 Rhodes (9, 11)
- Gene Robinson – guitars (1)
- Spencer Bean – guitars (4, 8, 10)
- Herb Smith – guitars (4)
- Randy Bowland – guitars (5)
- Joe Fusco – guitars (5)
- Ron Jennings – guitars (6)
- Dann Huff – guitars (9, 11)
- Freddie Washington – bass (1)
- Melvin Lee Davis – bass (4)
- Doug Grigsby – bass (5)
- Neil Stubenhaus – bass (9, 11)
- Daryl Burgee – drums (5), percussion (6)
- Jim Salamone – drum programming (6)
- Paul Leim – drums (8)
- John Robinson – drums (9, 11)
- Terral Santiel – congas (2)
- Pablo Batista – percussion (5, 6)
- Paulinho da Costa – percussion (11)
- Sam Peake – saxophone solo (6)
- Dave Koz – saxophone solo (7)
- Tom Snow – arrangements (3)
- Alex Brown – arrangements (4, 10), BGV arrangements (4, 10)
- Larry Davis – horn arrangements (6)
- Endre Granat – concertmaster (11)
- Roy Galloway – additional backing vocals (4, 10)
- Daryl Phinnessee – additional backing vocals (4, 10)
- Oren Waters – additional backing vocals (4, 10)

Production

- Gladys Knight – executive producer
- Bubba Knight – executive producer
- Frank DeCaro – production coordinator (10)
- Jeff Adamoff – art direction
- September – art direction, design
- Todd Gray – photography

Technical

- Steve Hall – mastering at Future Disc (Hollywood, California)
- Ron Gresham – recording (1)
- Taavi Mote – mixing (1), remix engineer (2)
- Kirk Ferraoli – recording (2)
- Louil Silas Jr. – remixing (2)
- Erik Zobler – remix engineer (3, 7)
- Hill Brim Swimmer – recording (4, 10), mixing (4, 10)
- Glen Barrett – recording (5, 6)
- Mike Tarsia – recording (5, 6)
- Bruce Weeden – mixing (5, 6)
- Steve MacMillan – recording (8)
- Mick Guzauski – recording (9, 11)
- Craig Burbidge – additional recording (1)
- Peter Arata – assistant engineer (1)
- Elmer Flores – assistant engineer (1)
- Scott McMinn – assistant engineer (5, 6)
- Harry Mosley – assistant engineer (5, 6)
- Adam Silverman – assistant engineer (5, 6)
- Joe Schiff – assistant engineer (8)
- Darren Klein – assistant engineer (9, 11)
