= Visions (Gladys Knight & the Pips album) =

Studio album by Gladys Knight & the Pips
- Released: 1983
- Studios: C. S. S. and Law (Las Vegas, Nevada); Studio Masters and Wally Heider (Los Angeles, California); United Western, Hollywood Sound, and A&M (Hollywood, California); Jennifudy and Larrabee (North Hollywood, California); Mars (Santa Monica, California); Kendun (Burbank, California); The Sound Shop (Nashville, Tennessee)
- Genres: R&B, soul
- Label: Columbia
- Producers: Edmund Sylvers (Track 1); Joey Gallo (Track 2); Rickey Smith (Tracks 3 & 6); Bubba Knight, Gladys Knight and Sam Dees (Tracks 4, 5, 7, 9 & 10); Richard Randolph (Track 6); Wilmer Raglin and William Zimmerman (Track 8)

Gladys Knight & the Pips chronology
Touch (1981)	Visions (1983)	Life (1985)

Visions is an album by the American soul group Gladys Knight & the Pips, released in 1983.

The album peaked at No. 34 on the Billboard Top LPs & Tape chart. "Save the Overtime (For Me)" reached No. 1 on the Hot Black Singles chart.

== Production ==
Half of the album's songs, including "Save the Overtime (For Me)", were produced by the group.

== Critical reception ==
Professional ratings
Review scores
Source	Rating
AllMusic	3/5 stars
Robert Christgau	B
The Encyclopedia of Popular Music	3/5 stars
The Rolling Stone Album Guide	3/5 stars

Robert Christgau wrote: "Accurately acclaimed as her finest work in a decade, this is amazingly uniform for an album featuring eight different bassists and eight different drummers recorded in eight different studios in L.A., Nashville, and Vegas." The Philadelphia Inquirer deemed the album "an uneven but nonetheless bold mixture of styles—sultry ballads, squeaky-clean pop and pumping funk tunes." The Rocket opined that "a couple of the ballads are weak in spots, and the variety of producers tends to give the album an incoherent feel."

The Washington Informer thought that "'Oh La De Da'—a brassy, fun-filled, funky celebration of the boogie—is a refreshing departure from the ups and downs of luv." Stereo Review opined that Knight "is buried in a mire of unimaginative and downright boring arrangements."

AllMusic called "Save the Overtime (For Me)" "the kind of jubilant, celebratory, rousing performance that had marked their best Motown singles, and it put some fresh life into what had become a stagnant group."

== Track listing ==
No.	Title	Writer(s)	Length
1.	"When You're Far Away"	James Harris III, Terry Lewis	5:50
2.	"Just Be My Lover"	Joey Gallo, Dana Meyers, William Shelby	3:29
3.	"Save the Overtime (For Me)"	Sam Dees, Gallo, Bubba Knight, Gladys Knight, Rickey Smith	4:42
4.	"Heaven Sent"	Dees	4:11
5.	"Don't Make Me Run Away"	Michael Lovesmith	3:47
6.	"Ain't No Greater Love"	Gene Dozier, Richard Randolph, Shelby, Smith	4:53
7.	"Seconds"	Dees, Ron Kersey	4:36
8.	"You're Number One (In My Book)"	Meyers, Wilmer Raglin, Leon Sylvers III, William Zimmerman	5:12
9.	"Oh La De Da"	Dees, B. Knight	3:35
10.	"Hero"	Larry Henley, Jeff Silbar	3:44

== Personnel ==
The Pips

- Gladys Knight – lead vocals, backing vocals (3)
- William Guest – vocals, backing vocals (3)
- Bubba Knight – vocals, backing vocals (3)
- Edward Patten – vocals, backing vocals (3)

Musicians

- James Harris III – keyboards (1), synth bass (1)
- Monte Moir – keyboards (1)
- Joey Gallo – keyboards (2, 3, 6, 8), synth bass (2)
- William Shelby – keyboards (2)
- Isaias Gamboa – keyboards (3)
- Rickey Smith – keyboards (3, 6), bass (6)
- Ron Kersey – keyboards (4, 7)
- Kenny Moore – acoustic piano (4)
- Michael Boddicker – synthesizers (4, 5, 7, 9)
- Michael Lovesmith – keyboards (5)
- Webster Lewis – acoustic piano (7)
- William Zimmerman – keyboards (8), synth bass (8)
- Gail Dieterichs – acoustic piano (9), synthesizers (9)
- Victor Hall – Rhodes electric piano (9)
- Ron Oats – keyboards (10), horns (10), strings (10)
- Tommy Organ – guitars (1)
- John McClain – guitars (2, 8)
- Earnest Reed – guitars (3)
- Wali Ali – guitars (4)
- David Williams – guitars (4, 7)
- Spencer Bean – guitars (5, 9)
- Horace Cole – guitars (6)
- Richard Randolph – guitars (6)
- Johnny McGee – guitars (7)
- Reggie Young – guitars (10)
- Leon Sylvers III – bass (3, 8), tambourine (6)
- Nathan East – bass (4)
- Rickey Minor – bass (5, 9)
- Henry Davis – bass (7)
- Steve Schaffer – bass (10)
- Wardell Potts – drums (1–3, 8)
- Vincent Brantley – drums (3)
- Melvin Webb – drums (4, 7)
- Leon "Ndugu" Chancler – drums (5)
- Derek Organ – drums (6)
- Ronald Rutledge – drums (9)
- James Stroud – drums (10)
- Paulinho da Costa – percussion (4, 5, 7, 9)
- Benjamin Wright – horns (4), strings (4)
- Jerry Hey – horns (5, 7, 9)
- Sam Dees – backing vocals (3)

Arrangements

- James Harris III – rhythm and vocal arrangements (1)
- Terry Lewis – rhythm and vocal arrangements (1)
- Leon Sylvers III – rhythm arrangements (1–3, 8), vocal arrangements (1, 2, 6, 8)
- Joey Gallo – rhythm arrangements (2)
- William Shelby – rhythm arrangements (2)
- Wilmer Raglin – vocal arrangements (2, 8)
- Eddie Karam – string arrangements (2)
- Harris Goldman – string conductor (2, 8)
- Edmund Sylvers – vocal arrangements (3)
- Gladys Knight and the Pips – vocal arrangements (3)
- Sam Dees – rhythm arrangements (4, 7, 9)
- Ron Kersey – rhythm arrangements (4, 7)
- Michael Lovesmith – rhythm arrangements (5)
- Richard Randolph – rhythm arrangements (6)
- Rickey Smith – rhythm arrangements (6)
- Bubba Knight – rhythm arrangements (7, 9)
- Gladys Knight – rhythm arrangements (7)
- William Zimmerman – rhythm and vocal arrangements (8)
- David Crawford – string arrangements (8)
- Victor Hall – rhythm arrangements (9)
- Rickey Minor – rhythm arrangements (9)
- Ron Oats – rhythm arrangements (10)

Production

- Nancy Donald – design
- René Magritte – cover artwork
- Bob Seidermann – photography

Technical

- Wally Traugott – mastering at Capitol Mastering (Hollywood, California)
- Bob Brown – engineer (1, 3, 6)
- Gary Boatner – engineer (2, 8)
- Steve Hodge – engineer (2, 8)
- Tom Perry – engineer (4, 5, 7, 9, 10), post production (4, 5, 7, 9, 10)
- John Banuelos – engineer (5)
- Paul McKenna – engineer (7)
- Ernie Wynnfry – engineer (10)
- Mark Harman – assistant engineer (1, 3)
- Barney Perkins – assistant engineer (1, 3), engineer (4)
- Jim Shifflett – assistant engineer (3)
- Lee Watters – assistant engineer (3, 6)
- Ross Pallone – assistant engineer (4, 5, 7, 9)
