= 2nd Anniversary =

Studio album by Gladys Knight & the Pips
- Released: October 1975
- Recorded: 1975
- Genre: Soul
- Length: 41:44
- Label: Buddah; 5639
- Producer: Eugene McDaniels, Kenny Kerner, Richie Wise, Gladys Knight, Bubba Knight, William Guest, Edward Patten

Gladys Knight & the Pips chronology
Knight Time (1974)	2nd Anniversary (1975)	The Best of Gladys Knight & The Pips (1976)

Professional ratings
Review scores
Source	Rating
AllMusic	4/5 stars
Christgau's Record Guide	C+
Rolling Stone	4/5 stars

2nd Anniversary is the fifteenth studio album recorded by American R&B group Gladys Knight & the Pips, released in October 1975 on the Buddah label. It was their fourth overall album for Buddah.

The first single, "Money", was moderately successful, reaching No. 4 R&B and No. 50 on the Billboard Hot 100. The second single, "Part Time Love", was more successful, peaking at No. 22 pop and No. 4 R&B. It would be their last single to reach the top 40 on the Billboard Hot 100 until 1988. The song also charted on the adult contemporary and UK Singles charts, No. 17 and No. 30, respectively.

== Track listing ==
Side one
No.	Title	Writer(s)	Length
1.	"Money"	Eugene McDaniels	3:50
2.	"Street Brother"	Eugene McDaniels	4:46
3.	"Part Time Love"	David Gates	2:30
4.	"At Every End There's a Beginning"	Richard Supa	3:41
5.	"Georgia on My Mind" (Live)	Hoagy Carmichael, Stuart Gorrell	3:37

Side two
No.	Title	Writer(s)	Length
1.	"You and Me Against the World"	Paul Williams, Kenny Ascher	6:11
2.	"Where Do I Put His Memory"	Jim Weatherly	4:52
3.	"Summer Sun"	Eugene McDaniels	6:03
4.	"Feel Like Makin' Love"	Eugene McDaniels	6:14

== Charts ==
Album

Chart (1975)	Peak
U.S. Billboard Top LPs	24
U.S. Billboard Top Soul LPs	4

Singles

Year	Single	Chart positions			
Year	Single	US	US R&B	US A/C	UK
1975	"Money"	50	4	—	—
1975	"Part Time Love"	22	4	17	30
