= Everybody Needs Love (The Temptations song) =

1967 single by The Temptations

Song by The Temptations

from the album The Temptin' Temptations
- Released: November 1, 1965
- Recorded: Hitsville USA (Studio A); 1965
- Genre: Soul
- Length: 3:00
- Label: Gordy
- Songwriter(s): Norman Whitfield; Edward Holland, Jr.
- Producer(s): Norman Whitfield

"Everybody Needs Love"

Single by Gladys Knight & the Pips

from the album Everybody Needs Love
- B-side: "Stepping Closer To Your Heart"
- Released: June 12, 1967
- Recorded: Hitsville USA (Studio A); 1966
- Genre: Soul
- Length: 3:04
- Label: Soul; S 35034
- Songwriter(s): Norman Whitfield; Edward Holland, Jr.
- Producer(s): Norman Whitfield

Gladys Knight & the Pips singles chronology
"Take Me in Your Arms and Love Me" (1967)	"Everybody Needs Love" (1967)	"I Heard It Through the Grapevine" (1967)

"Everybody Needs Love"

Single by Jimmy Ruffin

from the album Ruff 'N' Ready
- A-side: "I'll Say Forever My Love"
- Released: February 13, 1968
- Recorded: Hitsville USA (Studio A); 1965
- Genre: Soul
- Length: 3:04
- Label: Soul; S 35043
- Songwriter(s): Norman Whitfield; Edward Holland, Jr.
- Producer(s): Norman Whitfield

Jimmy Ruffin singles chronology
"Don't You Miss Me A Little Bit, Baby?" (1967)	"Everybody Needs Love" (1968)	"Don't Let Him Take Your Love From Me" (1968)

"Everybody Needs Love" is a 1964 Motown song by Norman Whitfield and Edward Holland, Jr. The first version released was by The Temptations for their album The Temptin' Temptations in 1965 (it also got airplay on some radio stations in the U.S.), but the most successful version was on a single by Gladys Knight & the Pips, which peaked at #39 on the Billboard Hot 100 chart, and #3 on the Billboard R&B singles chart, in 1967. Other Motown acts that recorded this song were Mary Wells (who was the first to record it, though it was not released until after she left the company), which featured Eddie Kendricks of The Temptations in the background, Jimmy Ruffin, The Velvelettes, and The Miracles. All versions of the song were produced by Whitfield.

== Personnel ==
=== Mary Wells version ===
- Lead vocals by Mary Wells
- Background vocals by The Love Tones: Joe Miles, William "Mickey" Stevenson, and Stan Bracely, with Eddie Kendricks of The Temptations
- Instrumentation by The Funk Brothers

=== Jimmy Ruffin version ===
- Lead vocals by Jimmy Ruffin
- Background vocals by The Andantes: Jackie Hicks, Marlene Barrow, and Louvain Demps
- Instrumentation by The Funk Brothers

=== Temptations version ===
- Lead vocals by Eddie Kendricks and Melvin Franklin
- Background vocals by Eddie Kendricks, Melvin Franklin, Paul Williams, David Ruffin, and Otis Williams
- Instrumentation by The Funk Brothers

=== Gladys Knight & the Pips version ===
- Lead Vocals by Gladys Knight
- Background Vocals by Merald "Bubba" Knight, Edward Patten and William Guest
- Instrumentation by The Funk Brothers

=== The Miracles version ===
- Lead Vocals by William "Smokey" Robinson
- Background Vocals by Claudette Robinson, Pete Moore, Ronnie White, and Bobby Rogers
- Guitar by Marv Tarplin `
- Other instrumentation by The Funk Brothers

=== The Velvelettes version ===
- Lead Vocals by Carolyn Gill
- Background Vocals by The Andantes: Louvain Demps, Marlene Barrow, and Jackie Hicks
- Instrumentation by The Funk Brothers
