= The End of Our Road =

Single by Gladys Knight & the Pips

from the album Feelin' Bluesy
- B-side: "Don't Let Her Take Your Love From Me"
- Released: January 25, 1968
- Recorded: 1967, Hitsville USA, Detroit
- Genre: R&B, soul
- Length: 2:19
- Label: Soul
- Songwriters: Rodger Penzabene; Norman Whitfield; Barrett Strong
- Producer: Norman Whitfield

Gladys Knight & the Pips singles chronology
"I Heard It Through the Grapevine" (1967)	"The End of Our Road" (1968)	"It Should Have Been Me" (1968)

"The End of Our Road" is a single written by Rodger Penzabene, Norman Whitfield and Barrett Strong in 1967. First recorded in 1967 by Gladys Knight & the Pips, the group's version of the song, released in 1968, became another top forty hit for them as it peaked at number fifteen on the pop singles chart and number five on the R&B singles chart.

== Background ==
As with the last two songs in Penzabene's trilogy for The Temptations, "I Wish It Would Rain" and "I Could Never Love Another (After Loving You)", "The End of Our Road" talked about the demise of a couple's relationship. The sentiment behind the song's words, as lyricist Penzabene wrote his songs as personal statements to his wife, was about publicizing his pain of his own marriage falling apart. Unable to handle the extreme pain and hurt caused by this, he wrote the songs, drawing from his real-life heartbreak. After all three songs were completed and recorded, Penzabene committed suicide.

== Gladys Knight & the Pips version ==
- Lead vocals by Gladys Knight
- Background vocals by Merald "Bubba" Knight, William Guest and Edward Patten
- Instrumentation by The Funk Brothers

=== Chart positions ===
Chart (1968)	Peak position
U.S. Billboard Hot 100	15
U.S. Billboard R&B Singles	5

== Marvin Gaye version ==
Much like the minor controversy with "I Heard It Through the Grapevine", Whitfield produced a different version of the song with Marvin Gaye. It was first issued as a track on Gaye's 1969 studio album, M.P.G., and then as a single on May 19, 1970. The song peaked at No. 40 on the Billboard Hot 100 pop singles chart. It was the first song counted down on the first show of the syndicated radio countdown program American Top 40 on the weekend of July 4, 1970.

- Lead vocals by Marvin Gaye
- Background vocals by The Andantes
- Instrumentation by The Funk Brothers

Record World called it "a great vehicle for Marvin Gaye." Cash Box said "The results once more are astounding. The vocal is inflated by production work that is strictly Motown monopoly."

=== Chart positions ===
Chart (1970)	Peak position
U.S. Billboard Hot 100	40
U.S. Billboard R&B Singles	7
