= If I Were Your Woman (Gladys Knight & the Pips album) =

Studio album by Gladys Knight & the Pips
- Released: 1971
- Recorded: March 1970
- Studio: Hitsville U.S.A., Detroit
- Genre: R&B
- Length: 39:11
- Label: Soul

Gladys Knight & the Pips chronology
Greatest Hits (1970)	If I Were Your Woman (1971)	Standing Ovation (1971)

Singles from If I Were Your Woman
- 1. "If I Were Your Woman" Released: November 1970; 2. "I Don't Want to Do Wrong" Released: May 6, 1971

If I Were Your Woman is the seventh studio album by American R&B quartet Gladys Knight & the Pips, released in 1971 on Soul Records.

== History ==
The song "If I Were Your Woman" was written by Gloria Jones and Pam Sawyer, who met during a barbecue lunch and gave the song to Clay McMurray, a former associate of Motown producer Norman Whitfield. The song was originally meant for Blinky to record, or the Supremes, but both did not record it, as Blinky was unavailable, and the Supremes were working with Frank Wilson at the time. Whitfield convinced McMurray to give the song to Gladys Knight and the Pips, and McMurray convinced Berry Gordy to release it as a single. Another single, "I Don't Want to Do Wrong", was written by three members and co-written by former Marvelette Katherine Anderson and Johnny Bristol. It was also produced by Bristol. Both singles from the album became a hit. The first single, "If I Were Your Woman", peaked at No. 9 on the pop charts, and topped the R&B charts at No. 1. The second single, "I Don't Want to Do Wrong" peaked at No. 17 on the pop charts, and on No. 2 on the R&B charts in July 1971.

== Reception ==
Professional ratings
Review scores
Source	Rating
AllMusic	3/5 stars
The Encyclopedia of Popular Music	3/5 stars

Andrew Hamilton of AllMusic stated, "If I Were Your Woman" and "I Don't Want to Do Wrong," provided the juice to send this LP all the way to #35 on Billboard's album chart. The former has evolved into an R&B classic, with remakes too numerous to mention, the most famous by Stephanie Mills."

== Track listing ==
Side one
No.	Title	Writer(s)	Length
1.	"If I Were Your Woman"	Clay McMurray, LaVerne Ware, Pam Sawyer	3:05
2.	"Feeling Alright"	Dave Mason	3:44
3.	"One Less Bell to Answer"	Burt Bacharach, Hal David	3:17
4.	"Let It Be"	Lennon–McCartney	3:15
5.	"I Don't Want to Do Wrong"	Gladys Knight, Johnny Bristol, Katherine Anderson Schaffner, Merald "Bubba" Knight, William Guest	3:20
6.	"One Step Away"	Hinton, Demps, Sylvester Stewart	3:25

Side two
No.	Title	Writer(s)	Length
1.	"Here I Am Again"	McMurray, Foster	3:20
2.	"How Can You Say That Ain't Love"	Hinton, Sawyer	2:28
3.	"Is There a Place (In His Heart for Me)"	McMurray, Coleman	3:25
4.	"Everybody Is a Star"	Stewart	3:30
5.	"Signed Gladys"	McMurray, Sawyer	2:59
6.	"Your Love's Been Good for Me"	Bradford*, Hinton*	3:25

== Charts ==
Chart (1971)	Peak position
US Billboard 200 (Billboard)	35
US Top R&B/Hip-Hop Albums (Billboard)	4

=== Singles ===
Year	Song title	US Pop Charts	US R&B Charts	Canada CHUM/RPM
1970	"If I Were Your Woman"	9	1	23
1971	"I Don't Want to Do Wrong"	17	2	30
