= Save the Overtime (For Me) =

"Save The Overtime (For Me)"

Single by Gladys Knight and the Pips

from the album Visions
- Released: March 1983
- Genre: Boogie, Post-disco, Soul music, electro-funk, Freestyle
- Length: 4:42
- Label: Columbia
- Songwriter(s): B. Knight, G. Knight, J. Gallo, R. Smith, S. L. Dees
- Producer(s): Rickey "Freeze" Smith

Gladys Knight and the Pips singles chronology
"That Special Time Of Year" (1982)	"Save The Overtime (For Me)" (1983)	"You're Number One (In My Book)" (1983)

"Save The Overtime (For Me)" is a 1983 single by the R&B and pop group, Gladys Knight and the Pips. The song, under the artistic direction of Leon Sylvers III (known for collaborating on Shalamar hits), was done in a soulful boogie style.

== Chart performance ==
The single was released from their album Visions and reached number sixty-six on the Hot 100, but was more successful on the R&B where it hit number one for a single week in mid 1983. The single was the first time the group hit number one on the R&B chart since 1974.

== 7-inch single ==
1. "Save The Overtime (For Me)" – 3:50
2. "Ain't No Greater Love" – 4:53

== 12-inch single ==
1. "Save The Overtime (For Me)" – 6:38
2. "Save The Overtime (For Me)" (instrumental) – 6:38

== Charts ==
Chart (1983)	Peak position
US Billboard Hot 100	66
US Hot R&B/Hip-Hop Songs (Billboard)	1
