= Neither One of Us (album) =

Studio album by Gladys Knight & the Pips
- Released: March 1973
- Recorded: 1972
- Genre: Soul
- Length: 34:12
- Label: Soul S 737L
- Producer: Joe Porter, Johnny Bristol, Clay McMurray, Nick Zesses, Dino Fekaris, Hal Davis

Gladys Knight & the Pips chronology
Standing Ovation (1972)	Neither One of Us (1973)	All I Need Is Time (1973)

Professional ratings
Review scores
Source	Rating
AllMusic	3/5 stars
Christgau's Record Guide	B
The Rolling Stone Album Guide	4/5 stars

Neither One of Us is the ninth studio album by American R&B quartet Gladys Knight & the Pips, released in early 1973 (see 1973 in music) by Motown Records on the Soul Records label.

The label released the album shortly after the group left the label for Buddah Records while the title track was rising up the charts. That song eventually peaked at No. 2 on the US Pop Charts, and reached the top spot on the R&B Charts. Motown issued another single, "Daddy Could Swear, I Declare", in April of the year. "Daddy" was a Top 20 hit on the Billboard Hot 100, reaching No. 19, and nearly topped the Soul Charts as well, peaking at No. 2. By that point, the group had released their first Buddah single, "Where Peaceful Waters Flow".

Neither One of Us became the group's most successful album on the Billboard Top LPs chart, peaking at number nine (it would later be tied by their 1973 album Imagination). It also topped the Top Soul LPs chart. Following the success of this album and the group's commercial acclaim at Buddah, Motown released three more albums of unreleased material.

== Track listing ==
Side one
No.	Title	Writer(s)	Length
1.	"Neither One of Us (Wants to Be the First to Say Goodbye)"	Jim Weatherly	4:15
2.	"It's Gotta Be That Way"	David Jones, Jr., Wade Brown, Jr., Johnny Bristol	4:32
3.	"For Once in My Life"	Ron Miller, Orlando Murden	4:00
4.	"This Child Needs Its Father"	Nick Zesses, Dino Fekaris	3:15
5.	"Who Is She (And What Is She to You)?"	Bill Withers, Stanley McKenny	4:12

Side two
No.	Title	Writer(s)	Length
6.	"And This Is Love"	Sylvia Moy, Frederick Long	3:21
7.	"Daddy Could Swear, I Declare"	Johnny Bristol, Gladys Knight, Merald Knight	3:42
8.	"Can't Give It Up No More"	David Jones, Jr., Wade Brown, Jr., Johnny Bristol	3:38
9.	"Don't It Make You Feel Guilty"	David Jones.Jr., Wade Brown, Jr., Johnny Bristol	3:15

== Personnel ==
Arrangers

- Artie Butler - arrangement on "Neither One of Us (Wants to Be the First to Say Goodbye)"
- Michael Omartian - arrangement on "Neither One of Us (Wants to Be the First to Say Goodbye)" and "Who Is She (And What Is She to You)?"
- H. B. Barnum - arrangement on "It's Gotta Be That Way" and "Daddy Could Swear, I Declare"
- David Van De Pitte - "For Once in My Life" and "Don't It Make You Feel Guilty"
- Tom Baird - arrangement on "This Child Needs Its Father"
- James Anthony Carmichael - arrangement on "And This Is Love"
- Paul Riser - arrangement on "Can't Give It Up No More"

== Charts ==
=== Album ===
Chart (1973)	Peak
U.S. Billboard Top LPs	9
U.S. Billboard Top Soul LPs	1

=== Singles ===
Year	Single	Chart positions			
Year	Single	US	US R&B	US A/C	UK
1973	"Neither One of Us (Wants to Be the First to Say Goodbye)"	2	1	15	31
1973	"Daddy Could Swear, I Declare"	19	2	—	—

== See also ==
- List of number-one R&B albums of 1973 (U.S.)
