= I Don't Want to Do Wrong =

Single by Gladys Knight & the Pips

from the album If I Were Your Woman
- B-side: "Is There a Place (In His Heart for Me)"
- Released: May 6, 1971
- Recorded: March 1970
- Genre: Soul; R&B
- Length: 3:15
- Label: Soul (S 35083)
- Songwriters: Johnny Bristol; Gladys Knight; Merald Knight; William Guest; Katherine Anderson-Schaffner
- Producer: Johnny Bristol

Gladys Knight & the Pips singles chronology
"If I Were Your Woman" (1970)	"I Don't Want to Do Wrong" (1971)	"Make Me the Woman That You Go Home To" (1971)

"I Don't Want to Do Wrong" is a song recorded by Gladys Knight & the Pips. It was released in May 1971 from the album If I Were Your Woman.

The song reached number two on the Best Selling Soul Singles chart. On the pop charts, it peaked at No. 17 on Billboard and No. 9 on Cash Box. It was a more modest hit in Canada.

== Chart history ==
Weekly singles chart (1970–71)	Peak position
Canada RPM Top Singles	30
U.S. Billboard Hot 100	17
U.S. Billboard Best Selling Soul Singles	2
U.S. Cash Box Top 100	9

Year-end chart (1971)	Rank
U.S. Billboard R&B	25
