= Neither One of Us (Wants to Be the First to Say Goodbye) =

Single by Gladys Knight & the Pips

from the album Neither One of Us
- B-side: "Can't Give It Up No More"
- Released: December 1972
- Recorded: MoWest, December 1972
- Genre: Soul, pop
- Length: 4:24
- Label: Soul; S 35098; S 35098
- Songwriter: Jim Weatherly
- Producer: Joe Porter

Gladys Knight & the Pips singles chronology
"Help Me Make It Through the Night" (1972)	"Neither One of Us (Wants to Be the First to Say Goodbye)" (1972)	"Daddy Could Swear, I Declare" (1973)

"Neither One of Us (Wants to Be the First to Say Goodbye)" is a song recorded by Gladys Knight & the Pips. Released in December 1972 on Motown's Soul Records imprint as S 35098, it became one of their biggest hit singles to date, and was also the last single the group released prior to them before leaving Motown for Buddah Records in February 1973.

== Recording ==
In late 1972, the group began recording songs for what would be their final Motown album, Neither One of Us, at Motown's Hitsville U.S.A. studios in Detroit. Among the songs they would record that wound up on the album included a funk-oriented cover of Bill Withers' "Who Is She (And What Is She to You)?", a cover of "For Once in My Life" and a self-penned composition, "Daddy Could Swear, I Declare", the latter song of which they had begun promoting in the fall of 1972 through a performance on the TV program, Soul Train. They also recorded a good portion of the album at Motown's Hollywood studios, MoWest.

They worked on the majority of the album with producer Joe Porter, who allowed the group creative freedom in the studio. According to Bubba Knight, Porter allowed the group to co-produce the album, saying Porter would bring them the songs and allowed them to "mold[ed] it to the Gladys Knight & The Pips' way" and upon hearing their arrangements, would tell engineers to just "turn the tape on". Porter had given them the song titled "Neither One of Us (Wants to Be the First to Say Goodbye)", a song written and first recorded by fledgling country singer-songwriter Jim Weatherly. Porter had picked the song out from Weatherly's publishing company. Knight recorded her lead vocal in one take at MoWest Studios, with parts of the background by the group already done.

The group then headed back from Los Angeles to Detroit but while in their car, Bubba Knight recounted that them singing the song prompted them to return to the studio to add more to the background, while Gladys redid her lead vocal. During this time period, the group's contract was up for renewal in the winter of 1973. The group eventually refused to renew it after failing to get Motown to renew their contract in "good faith" and eventually asked to be released from their contract.

== Release and reaction ==
Following the completion of the recording, Motown issued it for promotional use in December 1972, not too long afterwards. After negotiations with Motown broke down, the group was allowed to leave the label in January 1973; shortly thereafter, the group signed a contract with Buddah Records the following month in February 1973. By that point, the song was already climbing the charts on both the pop and R&B charts, on its way to give the group their biggest hit since "I Heard It Through the Grapevine" roughly six years before. Motown issued the group's final contractual album, Neither One of Us, that March.

On March 17, 1973, the song reached number one on the Hot Soul Singles chart, staying there for four consecutive weeks. Due to the song's strong crossover appeal, it eventually peaked at number two on the Billboard Hot 100, with Vicki Lawrence's "The Night the Lights Went Out in Georgia" blocking it from number one. However, it went number one on the U.S. Record World and Cashbox charts. It also crossed over to the adult contemporary chart, peaking at number 15. Worldwide, it was also successful, peaking at number 9 in France, number 11 in Canada and number 31 in the UK.

Around this time, the group had released their first Buddah single, "Where Peaceful Waters Flow", which also was written by Jim Weatherly. The song eventually peaked at number 28 on the pop chart, presumably because Motown kept pushing "Neither One of Us" to be played at more radio stations blocking the Buddah single from reaching bigger success. By the time "Neither One of Us" had begun to peak, Buddah issued the group's second single, the Weatherly-composed "Midnight Train to Georgia", in August 1973, where the song eventually topped both pop and R&B charts, pushing the group to superstardom. Despite efforts from Motown to stop "Midnight Train", the first "posthumously"-released Motown song "Daddy Could Swear" only peaked inside the top 20.

On March 2, 1974, at the Grammy Awards ceremony, Gladys Knight & The Pips won the Grammy Award for Best Pop Vocal Performance by a Duo or Group for "Neither One of Us". Previously that same night, they had won their first Grammy for Best R&B Vocal Performance by a Duo or Group for "Midnight Train to Georgia".

== Covers and samples ==
- In 1973, American country singer Bob Luman recorded a cover version retitled "Neither One of Us ... ." His version reached number seven on the Billboard Hot Country Singles chart, concurrent with the success of the Gladys Knight & the Pips' version.
- In 2018, German DJ DJ Koze released the single "Pick Up", which samples vocals of the song.

== Personnel ==
- Lead vocals by Gladys Knight
- Background vocals by Gladys Knight, Bubba Knight, William Guest and Edward Patten
- Instrumentation by the Funk Brothers and assorted orchestra players

== Charts ==
=== Weekly charts ===
Chart (1973)	Peak position
Canada Top Singles (RPM)	16
France Singles Chart	9
Italy (FIMI)	15
UK Singles Chart	31
US Billboard Hot 100	2
US Adult Contemporary (Billboard)	15
US Best Selling Soul Singles (Billboard)	1
US Cash Box Top 100	1
US Record World Singles	1

=== Year-end charts ===
Chart (1973)	Rank
Canada (RPM)	138
US Billboard Hot 100	45
US Cash Box Top 100	35

== Sources ==
- Dahl, Bill (February 28, 2011). Motown: The Golden Years: More than 100 photographs. Krause Publications. ISBN 978-0-87349-286-7.
