= I Heard It Through the Grapevine =

1966 song written by Norman Whitfield and Barrett Strong

- Side A of 2007 US reissue

Single by Gladys Knight & the Pips

from the album Everybody Needs Love
- B-side: "It's Time to Go Now"
- Released: September 28, 1967
- Recorded: June 17, 1967
- Studio: Hitsville USA (Studio A), Detroit, Michigan
- Genre: R&B; Southern soul
- Length: 2:52
- Label: Soul
- Songwriters: Norman Whitfield; Barrett Strong
- Producer: Norman Whitfield

Gladys Knight & the Pips singles chronology
"Take Me in Your Arms and Love Me" (1967)	"I Heard It Through the Grapevine" (1967)	"The End of Our Road" (1968)

"I Heard It Through the Grapevine"
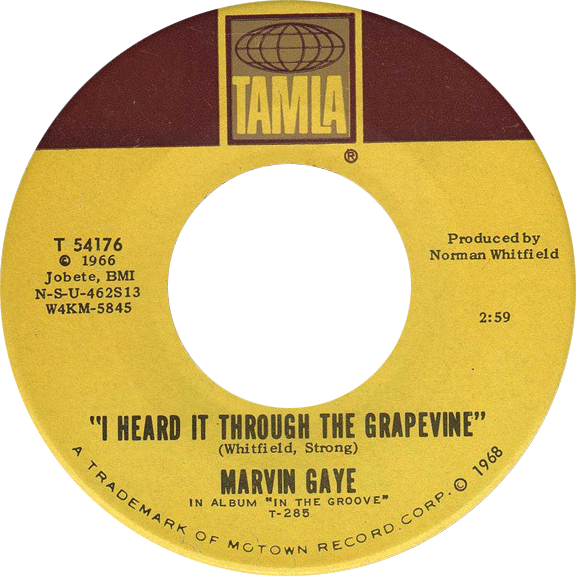
- One of pressings of the 1968 US single

Single by Marvin Gaye

from the album In the Groove
- B-side: "You're What's Happening (in the World Today)"
- Released: October 30, 1968
- Recorded: February 3 – April 10, 1967
- Studio: Hitsville USA (Studio A), Detroit, Michigan
- Genre: Psychedelic soul
- Length: 3:14 (album); 2:59 (single); 5:16 (extended)
- Label: Tamla
- Songwriters: Norman Whitfield; Barrett Strong
- Producer: Norman Whitfield

Marvin Gaye singles chronology
"His Eye is on the Sparrow" (1968)	"I Heard It Through the Grapevine" (1968)	"You Ain't Livin' till You're Lovin'" (1968)

"I Heard It Through the Grapevine" is a song written by Norman Whitfield and Barrett Strong for Motown Records in 1966. The first recording of the song to be released was produced by Whitfield for Gladys Knight & the Pips and released as a single in September 1967. It went to number one on the Billboard R&B Singles chart and number two on the Billboard Pop Singles chart and soon became the biggest selling Motown single up to that time.

The Miracles were the first to record the song in 1966, but their version was not released until August 1968 when it was included on their album Special Occasion. The Marvin Gaye version was the second to be recorded in the beginning of 1967 but the third to be released. It appeared on his 1968 album In the Groove a year and a half later where it gained the attention of radio disc jockeys. Motown founder Berry Gordy finally agreed to its release as a single on the Tamla subsidiary in October 1968; the record went to the top of the Billboard Pop Singles chart for seven weeks from December 1968 to January 1969, overtaking the Gladys Knight & the Pips version as the biggest hit single on the Motown family of labels up to that point.

The Gaye recording has since become an acclaimed soul classic. In 1998 the song was inducted into the Grammy Hall of Fame for "historical, artistic and significant" value. In 2004, it was placed 80th on the Rolling Stone list of The 500 Greatest Songs of All Time, then re-ranked at 81 in 2010. In 2021, it was ranked 119. On the commemorative fortieth anniversary of the Billboard Hot 100 issue of Billboard magazine in June 2008, Gaye's "Grapevine" was ranked sixty-fifth. In 2018, the Gladys Knight & the Pips version was also inducted into the Grammy Hall of Fame.

In addition to being released several times by Motown artists, the song has been recorded by a range of musicians including Creedence Clearwater Revival, who made an eleven-minute interpretation for their 1970 album, Cosmo's Factory.

== Composition ==
The song is composed in E-flat minor. The lyrics tell the story in the first person of the singer's feelings of betrayal and disbelief when he hears of his girlfriend's infidelity only indirectly "through the 'grapevine'".

By 1966, Barrett Strong, the singer on Motown Records' breakthrough hit, "Money (That's What I Want)", had the basics of a song he had started to write in Chicago, where the idea had come to him while walking down Michigan Avenue that people were always saying "I heard it through the grapevine". The phrase is associated with black slaves during the Civil War, who had their form of telegraph: the human grapevine. Producer Norman Whitfield worked with Strong on the song, adding lyrics to Strong's basic Ray Charles-influenced gospel tune and the single chorus line of "I heard it through the grapevine". This was to be the first of a number of successful collaborations between Strong and Whitfield.

== Motown recordings ==
Producer Norman Whitfield recorded "I Heard It Through the Grapevine" with various Motown artists.

=== The Miracles ===
The first known recording is with The Miracles on August 6, 1966, though there may also have been a recording with the Isley Brothers, or at least Whitfield intended to record it with them; however, a track has not turned up – some Motown historians believe that a session may have been scheduled but cancelled. The Miracles' version was not released as a single due to Berry Gordy's veto during Motown's weekly quality control meetings. Gordy advised Whitfield and Strong to create a stronger single. The Miracles version later appeared on their 1968 Special Occasion album, and a slightly different take, possibly from the same session but unreleased, appeared on the 1998 compilation album, Motown Sings Motown Treasures.

=== Marvin Gaye ===
Marvin Gaye's version, released on his 1968 album In the Groove, is the second known recording. Whitfield recorded the song with Gaye over five sessions, the first on February 3, 1967, and the last on April 10, 1967. Recordings of this version took more than a month due to Whitfield overdubbing Gaye's vocals with that of the Andantes' background vocals, mixing in several tracks featuring the Funk Brothers on the rhythm track, and adding the string section from the Detroit Symphony Orchestra with an arrangement by Paul Riser.

The session featuring Gaye led to an argument between the producer and singer. Whitfield wanted Gaye to perform the song in a higher key than his normal range, a move that had worked on David Ruffin during the recording of the Temptations' hit, "Ain't Too Proud to Beg". According to Gerald Posner, Whitfield was confident that he had a hit; however, despite approval from Motown's Quality Control Department, Gordy blocked the release.

=== Gladys Knight & the Pips ===
Gladys Knight & the Pips recorded "Grapevine" on June 17, 1967, in Motown's Studio A, also with Norman Whitfield as producer. After hearing Aretha Franklin's version of "Respect", Whitfield rearranged "Grapevine" to include some of the funk elements of the Muscle Shoals Rhythm Section. According to David Ritz, Whitfield set to record a song that would "out-funk" Aretha. After Whitfield presented the demo tapes, Gladys Knight, Bubba Knight, William Guest, and Edward Patten worked for several weeks on their vocal arrangement. To make the song suitable for Gladys, the first line of the second verse ("I know a man ain't supposed to cry/But these tears I can't hold inside") was altered to ("Take a good look at these tears in my eyes/Baby, these tears I can't hold inside"). After much talk, Gordy reluctantly allowed the Pips' version to be a single on September 28, 1967, on Motown's Soul label.

=== Other Motown artists ===
In 1968, Bobby Taylor & the Vancouvers recorded a version for their debut album based on Knight's recent hit. But after hearing the Marvin Gaye version, they felt they had made the wrong choice. In 1969, Whitfield produced a version for the Temptations "psychedelic soul" album, Cloud Nine, in which he "brought compelling percussion to the fore, and relegated the piano well into the wings". In 1971, the Undisputed Truth recorded the song in a Gaye-styled version.

== Releases ==
Since both the Miracles' and Marvin Gaye's renditions of the song were rejected by Gordy as a single, Gladys Knight & the Pips' version became the first to be released, on September 28, 1967, on Motown's Soul label, with "It's Time to Go Now" on the B-side. Motown put little support behind it and the Pips relied on connections with DJs across the United States to get the record played. The Pips' version of "Grapevine" reached number one on the Billboard R&B chart on November 25, 1967, and stayed there for six weeks, making it the group's second R&B number one after 1961's "Every Beat of My Heart". It reached number two on the Billboard Pop Singles chart the same month. It was Motown's best-selling single to that point, remaining in the top 10 of the Hot 100 for nearly two months. The song was later placed on the Gladys Knight & the Pips album Everybody Needs Love.

After this success Whitfield again wanted Gordy to release Gaye's "Grapevine" as a single, but Gordy did not want to release another version after the Pips had already made a hit out of it. In August 1968, Whitfield added "Grapevine" to Gaye's new album In the Groove. On release "Grapevine" became a radio hit and, according to Gordy himself, "The DJs played it so much off the album that we had to release it as a single". So Gaye's version was released as a single on October 30, 1968. Gaye's "I Heard It Through the Grapevine" eventually outsold the Pips', and until The Jackson 5's "I'll Be There" 20 months later, was the biggest hit single of all time on the Motown label. It stayed at the top of the Billboard Pop Singles chart for seven weeks, from December 14, 1968, to January 25, 1969. Gaye's "Grapevine" also held number one on the R&B chart during the same seven weeks, and stayed at number one in the United Kingdom for three weeks starting on March 26, 1969. The label was pleased with the success, although Gaye, depressed because of issues such as the illness of singing partner Tammi Terrell (which would kill her less than a year later), was quoted as saying that his success "didn't seem real" and that he "didn't deserve it". Cash Box said of it that "tremendous percussion and a brilliant production job add even more luster to a terrific vocal."

Due to the song's success, In the Groove was re-issued as I Heard It Through the Grapevine and peaked at number two on the R&B album chart and number sixty-three on the album chart, which was at the time Marvin's highest-charted solo studio effort to date. Because of the success of both versions, "I Heard It Through the Grapevine" was the first and last number one on the Billboard R&B chart in 1968: the Pips version was the first week of January, the Gaye version the last week of December. Gladys Knight was not pleased that Gaye's version usurped her own, and claimed that Gaye's version was recorded over an instrumental track Whitfield had prepared for a Pips song, an allegation Gaye denied. In 1985, one year following Gaye's death, the song was re-released in the UK reaching number eight thanks to a Levi's commercial (starring Nick Kamen).

== Legacy ==
The Gaye recording has become an acclaimed soul classic. In 2004, it was placed at number 80 on Rolling Stone's list of the 500 Greatest Songs of All Time, with the comment that Whitfield had produced the song with a number of artists using different arrangements, and that on the Marvin Gaye recording he had a "golden idea" when he set the song "in a slower, more mysterious tempo". In a new Rolling Stone list published in 2011, the single was placed slightly lower at number 81.

In 1998, the Marvin Gaye version of the song was inducted to the Grammy Hall of Fame for "historical, artistic and significant" value. In June 2008, on the commemorative fiftieth anniversary of the Billboard Hot 100 issue of Billboard magazine, the Marvin Gaye version was ranked as the sixty-fifth biggest song on the chart. In 2018, the Gladys Knight & the Pips version was also inducted into the Grammy Hall of Fame.

In June 2026, CBS News included the Gaye version in its list of the 250 essential American songs of the past 250 years, one of three Gaye songs to make the list.

== Personnel ==
=== Marvin Gaye version ===
- Lead vocals by Marvin Gaye
- Background vocals by the Andantes: Jackie Hicks, Marlene Barrow and Louvain Demps
- Instrumentation by the Funk Brothers and the Detroit Symphony Orchestra
  - Hammond organ by Earl Van Dyke
  - Wurlitzer electronic piano by Johnny Griffith
  - Drums by Richard "Pistol" Allen (tom toms) and Uriel Jones
  - Bass by James Jamerson
  - Percussion by Jack Ashford
- String arrangement by Paul Riser

=== Gladys Knight & the Pips version ===
- Lead vocals by Gladys Knight
- Backing vocals by Merald Knight, William Guest, and Edward Patten
- Instrumentation by the Funk Brothers
  - Piano by Earl Van Dyke
  - Bass by James Jamerson
  - Drums by Benny Benjamin (cymbals and fills) and Uriel Jones (main rhythm)

== Charts ==
=== Weekly charts ===
Gladys Knight & the Pips

Chart (1967–1968)	Peak position
Canada RPM Top Singles	5
UK Singles (OCC)	47
US Billboard Hot 100	2
US Cash Box Top 100	1

Marvin Gaye

Chart (1968–1969)	Peak position
Australia (Go-Set Top 40)	40
Canadian RPM Top Singles	8
France (SNEP)	88
Ireland (IRMA)	7
Netherlands (Dutch Top 40)	25
Poland (Billboard)	2
South African Chart	3
UK (Official Charts Company)	1
US Billboard Hot 100	1
US Billboard Hot R&B Singles	1
US Cash Box Top 100	1

(Reissue version)

Chart (1986)	Peak position
Belgium (Ultratop 50 Flanders)	18
Irish Singles Chart	4
Netherlands (Dutch Top 40)	18
Netherlands (Single Top 100)	23
UK (Official Charts Company)	8
West Germany (GfK)	48

Creedence Clearwater Revival

Chart (1973)	Peak position
Netherlands	10

Chart (1976)	Peak position
Canada RPM Top Singles	76
US Billboard Hot 100	43
US Cash Box Top 100	47

Roger Troutman

Chart (1981)	Peak position
US Billboard Hot 100	79
US Billboard R&B	1
US Cash Box Top 100	75

=== Year-end charts ===
Chart (1969)	Rank
Canada	28
US Billboard Hot 100	88
US R&B (Billboard)	40
US Cash Box	4

=== All-time charts ===
Chart (1958-2018)	Position
US Billboard Hot 100	84

=== Certifications ===
Region	Certification	Certified units/sales
Denmark (IFPI Danmark)	Gold	45,000^{‡}
Italy (FIMI) sales since 2009	Gold	25,000^{‡}
New Zealand (RMNZ)	Platinum	30,000^{‡}
Spain (Promusicae)	Gold	30,000^{‡}
United Kingdom (BPI) 1997 release	Gold	400,000^{^}
United Kingdom (BPI) 2004 release	Silver	200,000^{‡}
United Kingdom (BPI) 2004 release	Platinum	600,000^{‡}
United States	—	4,000,000
^{^} Shipments figures based on certification alone.^{‡} Sales+streaming figures based on certification alone.

== Grapevine (Tiësto) ==
"Grapevine"

Single by Tiësto
- Released: October 26, 2018
- Genre: Brazilian bass
- Length: 2:30
- Label: Musical Freedom; PM:AM; Universal
- Songwriters: Norman Whitfield; Barrett Strong; Tijs Verwest
- Producer: Tiësto

Tiësto singles chronology
"Jackie Chan" (2018)	"Grapevine" (2018)	"Ritual" (2019)

"Grapevine" is a song by Dutch DJ and producer Tiësto. It was released on October 26, 2018 in the Netherlands on the Musical Freedom label. It marked Tiësto's return to the Brazilian bass genre. Gaye's song is extensively sampled in the track, which was premiered during Tiësto's set at Ultra Music Festival 2018 in Miami. The music video was released on January 12, 2020.

Fabien Dori from French webmedia Guettapen criticized the "cruel lack of originality" of the track, stating that "the drop seems strangely like the one from 'Boom', and this is not the generic vocal which will enhance the whole".

=== Track listing ===
Digital download (MF306)

1. "Grapevine" - 2:30

Digital download (MF306)

1. "Grapevine" (extended mix) - 3:27

Digital download / remixes (MF319)

1. "Grapevine" (Tujamo remix) - 3:21
2. "Grapevine" (John Christian remix) - 2:30
3. "Grapevine" (Carta remix) - 2:35

=== Charts ===
Chart (2018)	Peak position
Belgium Dance (Ultratop Wallonia)	14
US Hot Dance/Electronic Songs (Billboard)	34

== Other versions ==
In addition to being recorded several times by Motown artists, the song has been recorded by musicians including Creedence Clearwater Revival, whose 11-minute version appeared on their 1970 album Cosmo's Factory. The band had initially started to play the song live before rearranging it in the studio with a long jam-like instrumental part for their record. Unusually for such a long song, radio stations began to play the song, and eventually it was released as a single against the band's wishes. The release reached 43 on Billboard's chart, with more modest success in other countries.

In addition, funk musician Roger Troutman whose extended version taken from his 1981 solo album, The Many Facets of Roger, brought the song back to number one on the R&B chart in 1981, marking the third time the song reached the top spot on that chart. It also made the Billboard Hot 100, but was not a Pop success this time around, peaking at number 79.

British punk band the Slits recorded the song in a post-punk style as the b-side to their first single "Typical Girls".

In 1996, the Soultans released their version of "I Heard It Through the Grapevine". It reached number 24 in Austria, and charted in New Zealand, Germany and Belgium.

Queen Latifah used the original version as a rhythmic basis for her 1998 single "Paper", produced by Pras Michel for her album Order in the Court.

A cover of "I Heard It Through the Grapevine" by English indie rock band Kaiser Chiefs appears on the 2005 compilation album Help: A Day in the Life.

=== Certifications ===
Certifications for "I Heard It Through the Grapevine" by Creedence Clearwater Revival
Region	Certification	Certified units/sales
New Zealand (RMNZ)	Gold	15,000^{‡}
^{‡} Sales+streaming figures based on certification alone.

== In popular culture ==
"I Heard It Through the Grapevine" has been used twice in television commercials – each time using session musicians recreating the style of the Marvin Gaye version. For the 1985 Levi's 501 commercial "Launderette", featuring male model Nick Kamen, agency BBH and director Roger Lyons, owing to budgetary constraints, brought in Karl Jenkins and Mike Ratledge to recreate the sound of the Marvin Gaye original with Tony Jackson, a Barbadian background singer for Paul Young, handling vocals and P. P. Arnold on backing vocals. The commercial's success prompted Tamla-Motown to re-release Gaye's single with the Levi's 501 logo on the sleeve — "an example of integrated marketing almost before the term was invented". The record went to number eight on the UK Singles chart, marking its second chart performance. A year later, in 1986, Buddy Miles was the singer for the clay animation group The California Raisins which sang it as part of a TV advertising campaign.

Marvin Gaye's version of the song is used in the opening credits of The Big Chill (1983) as each of the main characters gets to hear (through the "grapevine") about the death of their college friend, and then travels to his funeral; the song serves in an extradiegetic fashion to both unite the main characters' friendship and to locate it nostalgically for the viewer.
