= Everybody Needs Love (album) =

Studio album by Gladys Knight & the Pips
- Released: September 1967
- Recorded: 1966–1967
- Studio: Hitsville U.S.A., Detroit
- Genre: Soul
- Length: 34:12
- Label: Motown; SS 706
- Producer: Norman Whitfield, Harvey Fuqua, Johnny Bristol, Smokey Robinson

Gladys Knight & the Pips chronology
Gladys Knight and the Pips (1965)	Everybody Needs Love (1967)	Feelin' Bluesy (1968)

Singles from Everybody Needs Love
- 1. "Just Walk In My Shoes" Released: June 7, 1966; 2. "Take Me in Your Arms and Love Me" Released: March 16, 1967; 3. "Everybody Needs Love" Released: June 12, 1967; 4. "I Heard It Through The Grapevine" Released: September 28, 1967

Professional ratings
Review scores
Source	Rating
AllMusic	3/5 stars
The Rolling Stone Album Guide	3/5 stars

Everybody Needs Love is the third studio album by Gladys Knight & the Pips and their first album for Motown Records' Soul imprint. The LP, chiefly produced by Norman Whitfield, features the singles "Just Walk in My Shoes" (the 1966 group's Motown debut), "Take Me in Your Arms and Love Me", "Everybody Needs Love" and "I Heard It Through the Grapevine".

"Everybody Needs Love", which peaked at number 39 on the Billboard Hot 100, was Knight & the Pips first major Motown hit, but "Grapevine", which peaked at number 2, was a major success for the group and Motown. Selling over 2.5 million copies, "I Heard It Through the Grapevine" became Motown's best-selling single to that point. Its success would be overshadowed by Marvin Gaye's version of the song, which would be issued on Motown's Tamla label a year after Knight & the Pips' recording.

== Track listing ==
Side one
No.	Title	Writer(s)	Length
1.	"Everybody Needs Love"	Norman Whitfield, Edward Holland, Jr.	2:57
2.	"I'll Be Standing By"	Valerie Simpson, Nickolas Ashford	2:22
3.	"Since I've Lost You"	Whitfield, Barrett Strong	2:34
4.	"I Heard It Through the Grapevine"	Whitfield, Strong	2:58
5.	"You Don't Love Me No More"	Whitfield, Strong, Roger Penzabene	2:28
6.	"Ain't No Sun Since You've Been Gone"	Whitfield, Sylvia Moy, Cornelius Grant	2:26

Side two
No.	Title	Writer(s)	Length
1.	"Take Me in Your Arms and Love Me"	Strong, Penzabene, Grant	2:54
2.	"He's My Kind of Fellow"	Harvey Fuqua, Johnny Bristol	2:53
3.	"Yes, I'm Ready"	Barbara Mason	3:00
4.	"My Bed of Thorns"	William "Smokey" Robinson	2:52
5.	"Do You Love Me Just a Little, Honey"	Bristol, Fuqua, Vernon Bullock, Gladys Knight	2:59
6.	"Just Walk in My Shoes"	Helen Lewis Mastor, Kay Lewis Miller	2:26

== Charts ==
Chart (1967)	Peak
U.S. Billboard Top LPs	60
U.S. Billboard Top R&B LPs	12

Singles

Year	Single	Chart positions		
Year	Single	US	US R&B	UK
1966	"Just Walk in My Shoes"	129	—	35
1967	"Take Me in Your Arms and Love Me"	98	—	13
1967	"Everybody Needs Love"	39	3	—
1967	"I Heard It Through the Grapevine"	2	1	47

== Personnel ==
- Gladys Knight – lead vocals
- Merald "Bubba" Knight, William Guest, Edward Patten – backing vocals
- The Andantes – backing vocals on "Just Walk in My Shoes"
- The Funk Brothers – instrumentation
