= Imagination (Gladys Knight & the Pips album) =

Studio album by Gladys Knight & the Pips
- Released: October 9, 1973
- Recorded: June – September 1973
- Studio: Venture Sound, Somerville, New Jersey; Bell Sound, New York City
- Genre: Soul
- Length: 36:55
- Label: Buddah 5141
- Producer: Tony Camillo (tracks 1, 5, 7, 9), Kenny Kerner (tracks 2, 3, 4, 6), Richie Wise (tracks 2, 3, 4, 6); Gladys Knight, Bubba Knight, William Guest, Edward Patten (co-producers)

Gladys Knight & the Pips chronology
All I Need Is Time (1973)	Imagination (1973)	Claudine (1974)

Singles from Imagination
- 1. "Where Peaceful Waters Flow" Released: June 1973; 2. "Midnight Train to Georgia" Released: August 1973; 3. "I've Got to Use My Imagination" Released: November 1973; 4. "Best Thing That Ever Happened to Me" Released: February 1974

Professional ratings
Review scores
Source	Rating
AllMusic	4.5/5 stars
Christgau's Record Guide	B
The Rolling Stone Album Guide	4/5 stars

Imagination is the eleventh studio album recorded by American R&B group Gladys Knight & the Pips, released in October 1973 on the Buddah label. The album, the group's first for Buddah after leaving Motown, includes their first and only Billboard Hot 100 number-one hit "Midnight Train to Georgia", which also reached number-one on the R&B singles chart. Larry Wilcox was credited for the string and horn arrangements.

The album also produced other successful singles, including "I've Got to Use My Imagination" and "Best Thing That Ever Happened to Me", with both songs peaking at number-one on the R&B singles chart and top five on the Billboard Hot 100, and the moderately successful single "Where Peaceful Waters Flow". The album was also their second studio album to make the top ten on the Billboard 200 and their second of five R&B albums chart-toppers.

"Window Raisin' Granny", the closing track of the album, would be sampled in two notable popular music tracks of the 2000s - Christina Aguilera's 2007 single "Slow Down Baby" and Silibil N' Brains' unreleased 2004 song "It's All Love", which would only be released in 2014.

== Critical reception ==
Rolling Stone wrote that "Imagination is exactly what this album so desperately lacks," and noted the pattern of "nice touches, brilliant moments overcome by the anonymous production and banal lyrics."

== Track listing ==
All tracks are written by Jim Weatherly, except where noted.

Side one
No.	Title	Writer(s)	Length
1.	"Midnight Train to Georgia"		4:38
2.	"I've Got to Use My Imagination"	Gerry Goffin, Barry Goldberg	3:29
3.	"Storms of Troubled Times"		3:44
4.	"Best Thing That Ever Happened to Me"		3:45
5.	"Once in a Lifetime Thing"		3:41

Side two
No.	Title	Writer(s)	Length
1.	"Where Peaceful Waters Flow"		4:24
2.	"I Can See Clearly Now"	Johnny Nash	4:28
3.	"Perfect Love"	Paul Williams	2:37
4.	"Window Raisin' Granny"	William Guest, Gladys Knight, Merald Knight, Edward Patten	6:09

== Personnel ==
- Gladys Knight - lead vocals
- Merald "Bubba" Knight - backing vocals (lead vocals on I Can See Clearly Now)
- William Guest - backing vocals (lead vocals on Window Raisin' Granny)
- Edward Patten - backing vocals

== Charts ==
Chart (1973)	Peak
Australia (Kent Music Report)	27
U.S. Billboard Top LPs	9
U.S. Billboard Top Soul LPs	1

Singles

Year	Single	Chart positions			
Year	Single	US	US R&B	US A/C	UK
1973	"Where Peaceful Waters Flow"	28	6	18	—
1973	"Midnight Train to Georgia"	1	1	19	10
1973	"I've Got to Use My Imagination"	4	1	—	—
1974	"Best Thing That Ever Happened to Me"	3	1	10	7

== Certifications ==
Region	Certification	Certified units/sales
Canada (Music Canada)	Gold	50,000^{^}
United States (RIAA)	Gold	500,000^{^}
^{^} Shipments figures based on certification alone.

== See also ==
- List of number-one R&B albums of 1973 (U.S.)
- List of number-one R&B albums of 1974 (U.S.)
