= I've Got to Use My Imagination =

Single by Gladys Knight & the Pips

from the album Imagination
- B-side: "I Can See Clearly Now"
- Released: November 1973
- Genre: Psychedelic soul; funk
- Length: 3:29
- Label: Buddah
- Songwriters: Gerry Goffin, Barry Goldberg
- Producer: Kenny Kerner

Gladys Knight & the Pips singles chronology
| "Midnight Train to Georgia" (1973) | "I've Got to Use My Imagination" (1973) | "Best Thing That Ever Happened to Me" (1974) |

"I've Got to Use My Imagination" is a song recorded by Gladys Knight & the Pips. Released from the hit album, Imagination, which was their debut album with Buddah Records. It was a success on the soul and pop charts, spending a week at number one on the Hot Soul Singles chart in early 1974 and peaking at number four on the Billboard Hot 100. It became one of the band's highest charting songs and eventually sold more than one million copies.

On the television series A Different World, Whitley, Jaleesa and another classmate perform the song to audition to sing backup for Gladys Knight, who made a special guest appearance on the show.

The song has been covered by such artists as Joan Osborne, Professor RJ Ross, Bobby Bland, Joe Cocker and The Rides. Ian Moss recorded a version for his sixth studio album, Soul on West 53rd (2009).

== Charts ==
| Chart (1973–1974) | Peak position |
|---|---|
| U.S. Billboard Hot 100 | 4 |
| U.S. Billboard Hot Soul Singles | 1 |
