= I Feel a Song (In My Heart) =

Single by Gladys Knight & the Pips

from the album I Feel a Song
- B-side: "Don't Burn Down the Bridge"
- Released: October 1974
- Genre: Soul
- Length: 2:48
- Label: Buddah Records
- Songwriters: Tony Camillo, Mary Sawyer
- Producers: Tony Camillo, Gladys Knight & the Pips

Gladys Knight & the Pips singles chronology
"Between Her Goodbye and My Hello" (1974)	"I Feel a Song (In My Heart)" (1974)	"Love Finds Its Own Way" (1975)

"I Feel a Song (In My Heart)" is a song written by Tony Camillo and Mary Sawyer. The song was originally recorded by Sandra Richardson in 1971.

== Gladys Knight & the Pips version ==
In 1974, the song was recorded by Gladys Knight & the Pips and was from the album I Feel a Song. The single spent two weeks at number one on the Hot Soul Singles chart in late 1974. It also peaked at number 21 on the Billboard Hot 100 singles chart. The version by Gladys Knight and the Pips, which was faithful to the original interpretation and produced by Camillo, was the fourth recording of the song.

== Chart positions ==
Chart (1974)	Peak position
U.S. Billboard Hot 100	21
U.S. Billboard Hot Soul Singles	1
Canada (RPM)	13

== Other recordings ==
- In 1972, the song was subsequently recorded by Linda Carr as well as the Stairsteps (whose lyrics were more spiritual), all of whom, like Gladys Knight's version, were recorded for the Buddah Records label.
- In 1975, Bob James released a version on his album Two, featuring Patti Austin on vocals.

== Sampling ==
- In 2006, "I Feel a Song (In My Heart)" was sampled by record producer Darkchild in Megan Rochell's R&B song "Heartbreak".
- In 2010, the song was also sampled in Cassius's single "I <3 U So". This version would be sampled in Jay-Z and Kanye West's 2011 single "Why I Love You" with Mr Hudson also reprising his collaboration and providing the vocals for the song's chorus.
