= You're the Best Thing That Ever Happened to Me =

1973 song originally performed by Danny Thomas

"You're the Best Thing That Ever Happened To Me"

Single by Ray Price

from the album You're the Best Thing That Ever Happened To Me
- B-side: "What Kind of Love is This"
- Released: July 1973 (U.S.)
- Recorded: ca. May 1973
- Genre: Country
- Length: 3:50
- Label: Columbia 45889
- Songwriter: Jim Weatherly
- Producer: Don Law

Ray Price singles chronology
"She's Got to Be a Saint" (1972)	"You're the Best Thing That Ever Happened To Me" (1973)	"Storms of Troubled Times" (1974)

"Best Thing That Ever Happened To Me"

Single by Gladys Knight & the Pips

from the album Imagination
- B-side: "Once in a Lifetime Thing"
- Released: February 1974 (U.S.)
- Recorded: 1973
- Genre: Soul
- Length: 3:44
- Label: Buddah 403
- Songwriter: Jim Weatherly
- Producers: Kenny Kerner and Richie Wise; Gladys Knight and the Pips were co-producers

Gladys Knight & the Pips singles chronology
"I've Got to Use My Imagination" (1973)	"Best Thing That Ever Happened To Me" (1974)	"On and On" (1974)

"You're the Best Thing That Ever Happened To Me" — also known simply as "Best Thing That Ever Happened To Me" — is a song written by Jim Weatherly. It was first recorded in 1973 by B. J. Thomas. Soon after it was done by Ray Price from his album You're the Best Thing That Ever Happened To Me. The song enjoyed two runs of popularity, each by an artist in a different genre.

Weatherly told Tom Roland in The Billboard Book of Number One Country Hits that he wrote the song in 1971 and let his father-in-law first record it as a Christmas present for the latter's wife. "I thought it was really strange that nobody'd written a song with that title — possibly somebody had, but I'd never heard it — so I just sat down and let this stream of consciousness happen. I basically wrote it in a very short period of time, probably 30 minutes or an hour."

== The versions ==
=== Ray Price country version ===
The song's first run of popularity, as "You're the Best Thing That Ever Happened to Me," came in 1973, when country music singer Ray Price took the song to number 1 on the Billboard Hot Country Singles chart on October 6, 1973.

For that version, it represented a last and a first. The "last" was Price's seventh and most recent No. 1 single, in a string dating back to his 1956 hit "Crazy Arms". The "first": It was the No. 1 single on the debut program of American Country Countdown, which used the Billboard chart in its programming. Although it fell short of the top 40 in his native United States, the song was an easy listening hit in Canada, his third such hit there.

=== Gladys Knight & the Pips pop/R&B version ===
In the early- to mid-1970s, Gladys Knight & the Pips recorded several of Weatherly's songs, and in 1974, they dipped into his catalog once again with their rendition of the song. Their version, titled "Best Thing That Ever Happened to Me," reached number 3 on the Billboard Hot 100 that spring and topped the Hot Soul Singles for two weeks. The single was certified gold by the RIAA for sales of one million copies. It also reached the top 10 in the United Kingdom.

=== James Cleveland gospel version ===
In 1975, gospel singer Rev. James Cleveland & The Charles Fold Singers recorded a live version called "Jesus, is the Best Thing That Ever Happened To Me", which was cited (in the song) as an adaptation of the Gladys Knight & The Pips version of the song.

== Chart history ==
=== Weekly charts ===
Chart (1974–1975)	Peak position
Canada RPM Top Singles	6
Ireland (IRMA)	10
UK (OCC)	7
US Billboard Hot 100	3
US Billboard Adult Contemporary	10
US Cash Box Top 100	3

=== Year-end charts ===
Chart (1974)	Rank
Canada	80
US Billboard Hot 100	34
US Cash Box	28

=== The Persuaders R&B version ===
In 1974, The Persuaders also recorded a version, taken from their album of the same name Their version was quieter, less brassy, and more introspective than The Pips' version The song reached number 85 on the Billboard Hot 100 chart.

=== Dean Martin pop version ===
The song was also recorded by Dean Martin in 1973.

=== Andy Williams version ===
Andy Williams released a version in 1974 on his album, The Way We Were.

=== Steve Lawrence version ===
Steve Lawrence released a version in 1973 under MGM Records label.

== Chart performance ==
=== Ray Price version ===
Chart (1973)	Peak position
U.S. Billboard Hot Country Singles	1
U.S. Billboard Hot 100	82
Canadian RPM Country Tracks	2
Canadian RPM Adult Contemporary Tracks	37
