= Love Overboard =

Single by Gladys Knight & the Pips

from the album All Our Love
- Released: November 1987
- Recorded: 1987
- Genre: R&B, dance-pop
- Length: 5:26
- Label: MCA
- Songwriter: Reggie Calloway
- Producers: Reggie Calloway & Vincent Calloway for Calloco, Inc.

Gladys Knight & the Pips singles chronology
"Come Back and Finish What You Started" (1978)	"Love Overboard" (1987)

"Love Overboard" is a Grammy Award-winning 1987 single by Gladys Knight & the Pips.

== Chart performance ==
"Love Overboard" was the group's last of ten #1 hits on the Hot Black Singles chart. It crossed over to #13 on the Billboard Hot 100 chart as well. The single was also successful on the dance charts, peaking at #4. It also peaked at #59 on the Canada RPM Top 100 Singles chart.

== Popular culture ==
- Knight performs the song in a dream sequence on the episode "Three Girls Three" of A Different World, with Whitley and Jaleesa singing background for her (instead of the Pips).

== Charts ==
Chart (1987)	Peak position
Canada Top Singles RPM	59
US Billboard Hot 100	13
US Hot R&B/Hip-Hop Songs (Billboard)	1
US Dance Club Songs (Billboard)	4
