= Gladys Knight & the Pips =

American R&B/soul vocal group

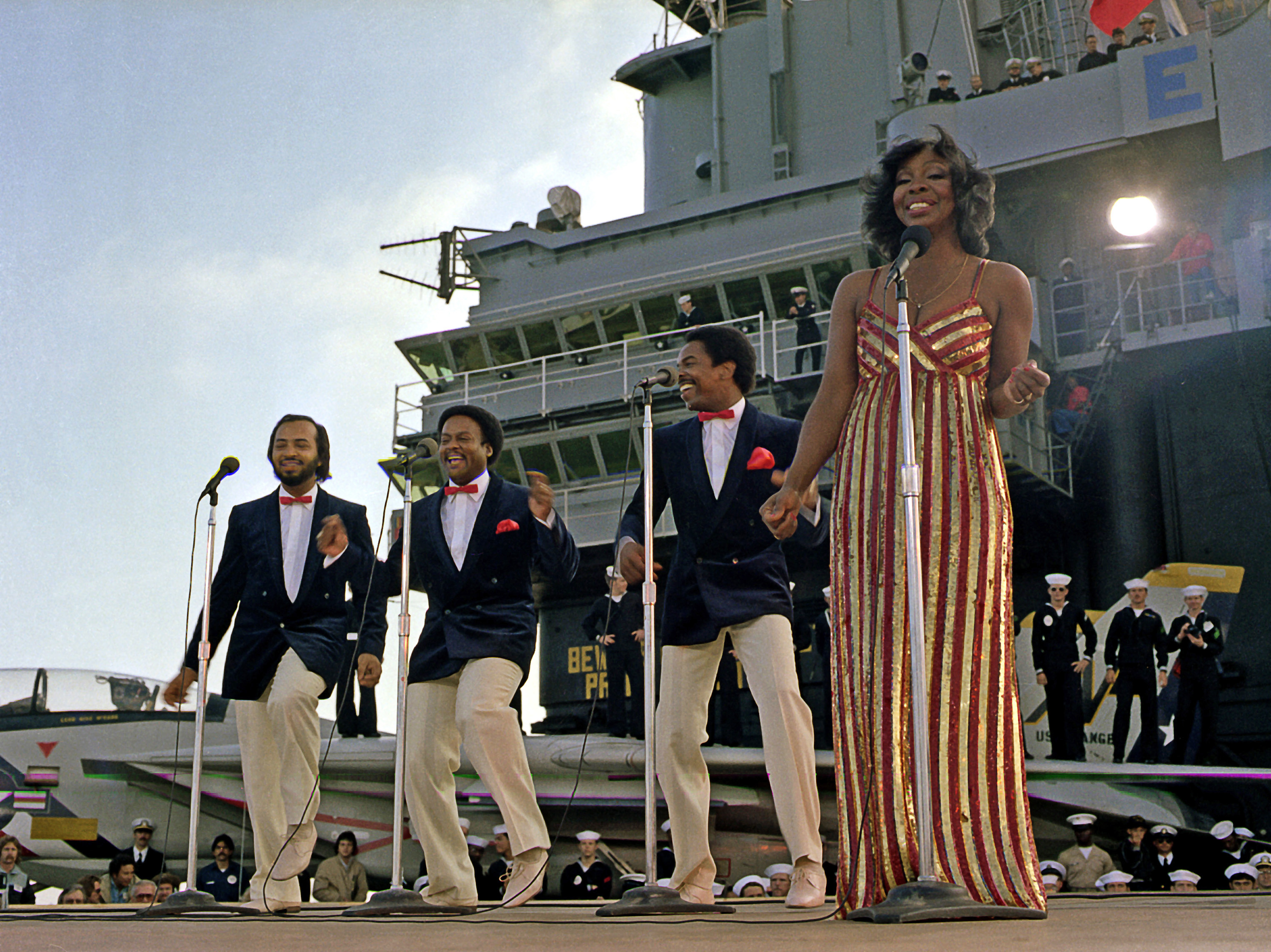
- Gladys Knight & the Pips perform aboard aircraft carrier USS Ranger on November 1, 1981. Left to right: William Guest, Edward Patten, Merald "Bubba" Knight, and Gladys Knight.

Background information
- Also known as: The Pips (1952–1961)
- Origin: Atlanta, Georgia, U.S.
- Genres: R&B; soul; funk
- Years active: 1952–1989
- Labels: Brunswick; Fury; Maxx; Soul/Motown; Buddah; Columbia; MCA
- Past members: Gladys Knight; Bubba Knight; William Guest; Edward Patten; Brenda Knight; Eleanor Guest; Langston George

Gladys Knight & the Pips were an American R&B, soul, and funk family music group from Atlanta, Georgia, that remained active on the music charts and performing circuit for more than three decades starting from the early 1950s.

Starting out as simply the Pips in 1952, derived from a cousin's nickname, the founding members were Gladys Knight, brother Merald "Bubba" Knight, sister Brenda Knight and cousins Eleanor Guest and William Guest. After a couple of years performing in talent shows, the group signed with Brunswick Records in 1957, recording a couple of singles that failed to chart. Brenda Knight and Eleanor Guest eventually left the group and were replaced by another cousin, Edward Patten, and a non-relative, Langston George in 1959. This lineup produced the group's first hit single, "Every Beat of My Heart". After the single was released on three different labels, they changed their name to Gladys Knight & the Pips in 1961. Langston George left the same year and Gladys Knight left in 1962 to start a family with musician Jimmy Newman. Knight rejoined in 1964 and this lineup continued until the group's disbandment in 1989.

The group reached commercial success after signing with Motown Records in 1966. After a year and a half, the group recorded the first hit single version of "I Heard It Through the Grapevine" in 1967, which led to several hit singles for Motown's Soul Records label, including "Nitty Gritty", "Friendship Train", "If I Were Your Woman", "I Don't Want to Do Wrong" and the Grammy-winning "Neither One of Us (Wants to Be the First to Say Goodbye)", before leaving the label for Buddah Records in 1973. At Buddah, they recorded the hits "Best Thing That Ever Happened to Me", "I've Got to Use My Imagination", "I Feel a Song (In My Heart)" and their Grammy-winning and number-one hit single, "Midnight Train to Georgia". In 1974, they recorded the soundtrack to the successful film Claudine with producer Curtis Mayfield, which included the songs "On and On", "The Makings of You" and "Make Yours a Happy Home". Contractual difficulties with their labels forced the group to record side projects from 1977 until 1980 when they signed with Columbia Records. Later hits included "Landlord", "Save the Overtime (For Me)" and the Grammy-winning single "Love Overboard". In 1989, the group disbanded with the Pips retiring and Knight embarking on a successful solo career.

Gladys Knight & the Pips are multiple Grammy and American Music Award winners and are inductees into the Rock and Roll Hall of Fame and the Vocal Group Hall of Fame in 1996 and 2001 respectively.

== History ==
=== Early years (1952–1961) ===
Gladys Knight performed on Ted Mack's Original Amateur Hour in 1952 at the age of eight, winning first prize. On September 4, 1952, Gladys, Bubba, sister Brenda and their cousins William and Eleanor Guest began performing together during Bubba's tenth birthday party after a record player malfunctioned. Shortly afterwards, the quintet agreed to form a group under the insistence of Gladys' mother Elizabeth Knight. They settled on the name The Pips, inspired by the nickname of their cousin James "Pip" Woods. By 1955, the group began performing on the talent show circuit in their hometown of Atlanta, winning each talent show they entered. This success allowed them to get a record contract with Brunswick Records in 1957. At Brunswick, the group released two recordings that failed to chart. Despite this, the group was now opening for top recording acts such as Jackie Wilson and Sam Cooke.

By 1959, Brunswick dropped the group and both Brenda Knight and Eleanor Guest left the group to begin families. They were replaced by another cousin, Edward Patten, and a friend, Langston George. Patten and George were involved in another group before joining the Pips.

=== Early success (1961–1965) ===
In 1961, the Pips recorded the Johnny Otis-penned "Every Beat of My Heart". Because the group was without a record label, a local Atlanta label, Huntom Records, pushed the single and got a distribution deal with Vee-Jay Records to release the single. During this time, the group moved to New York where they auditioned for Bobby Robinson's Fury Records. Upon learning that "Every Beat of My Heart" was already becoming a hit and cutting the group out of profits, Robinson had the group re-record the song and re-release it on Fury Records. Both versions made the Billboard charts, with the Huntom/Vee-Jay version reaching number six on the Billboard Hot 100. Prior to the re-release on Fury Records, the group changed their name to Gladys Knight & the Pips. Later in 1961, the newly christened quintet released the single, "Letter Full of Tears", which became another top 40 hit in early 1962. After a string of single releases on Fury Records, Langston George left the group in 1962.

The group's success was halted by Gladys Knight's sudden departure in 1962 to start a family with husband Jimmy Newman, a musician. Knight gave birth to the couple's son James Gaston Newman III in August 1962. A daughter, Kenya Maria Newman, was born in November 1963. During this period, the Pips kept performing and recording to little fanfare, and eventually each Pip took odd jobs while Gladys Knight began performing solo with Newman, now her musical director. Eventually Gladys reunited with the Pips and signed with a local New York label, Maxx Records, that year. During that time, Newman served as the group's musical director. During this period, the group were mentored by Maurice King and Cholly "Pops" Atkins; their association with King going back to the group's early years traveling to Detroit. The group recorded a third top 40 single with Van McCoy's "Giving Up" in 1964. Other notable songs they released on Maxx on the Gladys Knight and the Pips album include "Lovers Always Forgive", "(There Will Never Be) Another Love", "Either Way I Lose", "Go Away, Stay Away", "Maybe Maybe Baby", ""Stop and Get a Hold of Myself", "Who Knows? (I Just Can't Trust You)" and "If I Should Ever Fall in Love".

The group developed a reputation for exciting and polished live performances, that enabled them to work even without the benefit of bestselling records. Choreographer Atkins designed "fast-stepping" dance routines that became a signature of the Pips' stage presentation; Atkins later described his working and personal relationship with the group in his autobiography, Class Act: The Jazz Life of Choreographer Cholly Atkins: "The one thing that I was pleased about was a stipulation in my contract that allowed me to keep working with Gladys Knight & the Pips as personal clients even though I would be an employee of Motown Records. To tell the truth, Gordy wasn't too happy about it at first, but this is something that I would not compromise under any circumstances. By that time, Gladys and the guys were like my own children!"

=== Gladys Knight & the Pips join Motown Records (1966–1973) ===
By the end of 1965, Berry Gordy was scouting to get the group signed to his Motown label. Knight initially refused to sign due to her fears that the label would overlook them for the more popular artists on his roster, but she was outvoted by the Pips. They would sign with Motown in 1966, being assigned to Motown's Soul Records label, a label which featured acts who had more of an R&B flavor than a pop one. Their first Motown single, "Just Walk in My Shoes", was a hit in the UK, but the group was disappointed in Motown having The Andantes sing over the Pips' signature harmony in the song, resulting in the group demanding that the Andantes not be featured on any more of the group's recordings. They also were one of the few Motown acts that did not regularly perform on the label's Motortown Revues, with an exception being a Christmas showcase at the Fox Theater in Detroit, recorded for the album, Motortown Revue Live. A second single, "Take Me in Your Arms and Love Me", also reached the charts in the UK.

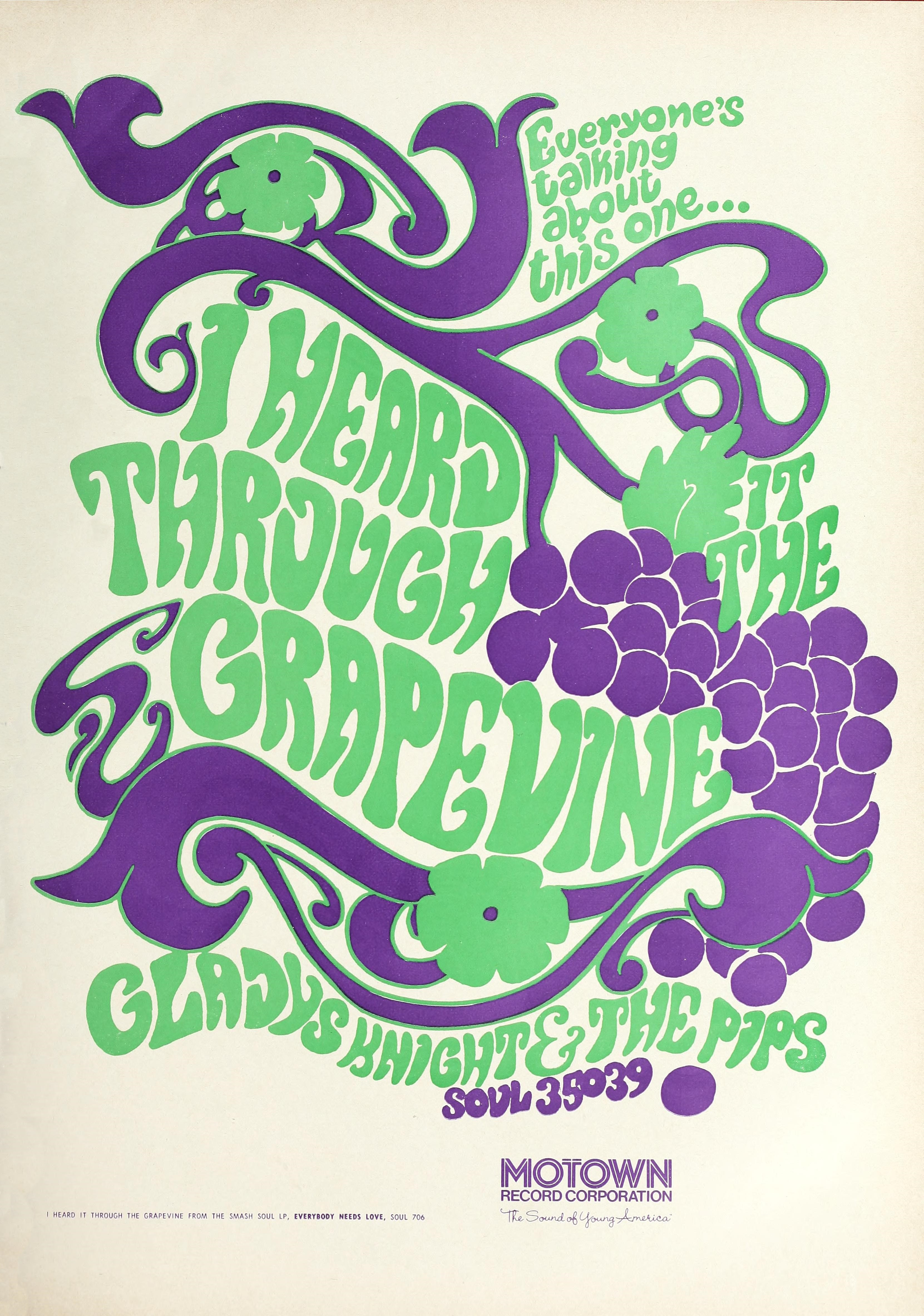
Cashbox advertisement, November 4, 1967

Their third single, "Everybody Needs Love", became the group's first American charted single in two years, reaching number 39 on the Billboard Hot 100 and number three R&B after its release in 1967. On the A&E Network television program Biography, Knight stated that she and the Pips were regarded as a second-string act, and that "Diana (Ross) & the Supremes, The Temptations, and Marvin Gaye were given all the hits, while we took the leftovers." In Knight's autobiography, Between Each Line of Pain and Glory: My Life Story, she stated that Diana Ross had the group removed from being The Supremes' opening act on a 1968 tour for, according to Knight, being 'too good'. The group finally scored a career breakthrough with their fourth Motown single, "I Heard It Through the Grapevine", which reached number two on the Billboard Hot 100 and number one on the R&B chart. The group's recording became Motown's bestselling single ever to that point, selling more than 2.5 million copies. Marvin Gaye's version of the song, released in 1968, outsold the group's version, selling four million copies and reaching number one on the Hot 100. While at Motown in 1968, Knight was the first person to suggest that Berry Gordy sign the up-and-coming group called The Jackson Five (though Bobby Taylor of the Vancouvers also had a role), after appearing with them on a concert held in Gary, Indiana, to help elect Mayor Richard Hatcher, despite the claim that Diana Ross discovered them.

Following the success of "Grapevine", the group worked frequently with Norman Whitfield. Whitfield produced them the hits, "The End of Our Road", "It Should've Been Me", "Friendship Train", "Nitty Gritty" and "You Need Love Like I Do (Don't You)". They also recorded Ashford & Simpson's "Didn't You Know (You'd Have To Cry Sometime)" in 1969. They scored their second million-selling Motown single with the ballad "If I Were Your Woman" in 1970. Another ballad, the self-composed "I Don't Want to Do Wrong", became another million-selling single. Both singles were featured on their first number one album, also titled If I Were Your Woman. In late 1971, they released a soulful version of Kris Kristofferson's "Help Me Make It Through the Night", which became an international hit. The group released the Jim Weatherly ballad, "Neither One of Us (Wants to Be the First to Say Goodbye)", in December 1972, the single would become their last single released while still with the label. As the single was charting, the group tried to negotiate a better contract with Motown. Negotiations fell through weeks later and, in February 1973, the group left Motown and signed with Buddah Records. "Neither One of Us" became their biggest selling single at Motown, reaching number two on the Billboard Hot 100 and winning the group a Grammy for Best Pop Performance by a Duo or Group with Vocals.

=== Taking the "Midnight Train" to Buddah Records (1973–1980) ===
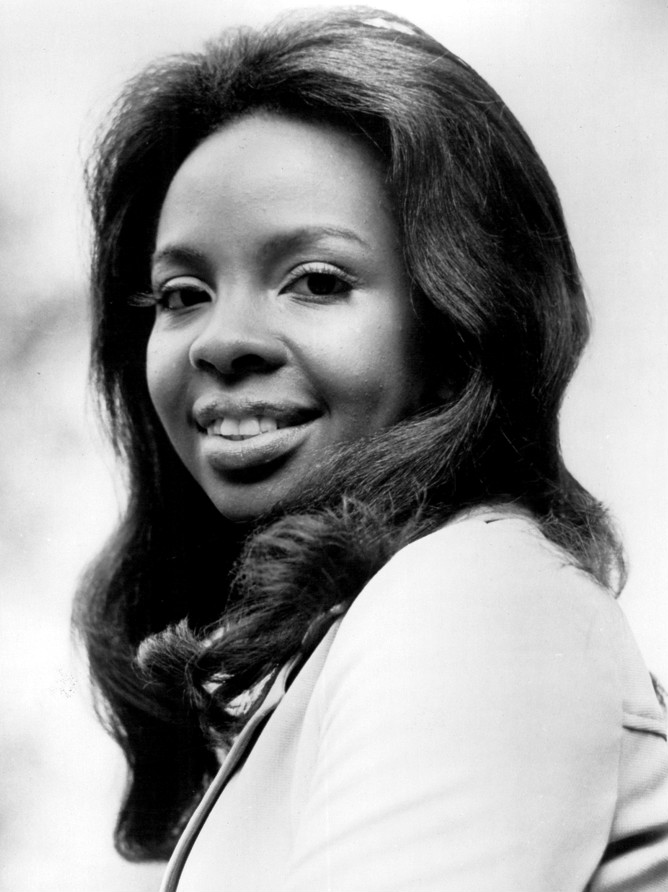
Gladys Knight (1974)

Following the signing with Buddah Records, the label issued another Weatherly ballad, "Where Peaceful Waters Flow", released around the same time "Neither One of Us" and a Motown single, "Daddy Could Swear, I Declare", was charting. The song became a modest success as a result. The group reached its popular and critical peak soon afterwards, starting with the release of another Weatherly song, "Midnight Train to Georgia", in August 1973. The song eventually hit number one on both the Billboard Hot 100 and R&B singles charts, becoming their signature song.

They followed that single with the release of the million-selling album, Imagination, which released two more top ten singles, "I've Got to Use My Imagination" and "Best Thing That Ever Happened to Me". The release of Imagination sparked a consecutive series of million-selling albums for the label including the soundtrack to the movie, Claudine; I Feel a Song and 2nd Anniversary. In 1975, the group scored a mid-season variety series, The Gladys Knight & the Pips Show, that aired for four episodes on NBC. During this time, the group recorded more hit singles, including "I Feel a Song (In My Heart)", "Part-Time Love", "Love Finds Its Own Way" and the live recording, "The Way We Were/Try to Remember".

By 1977, the group ran into contract disputes with both Motown and Buddah Records. After asking to be released from their contract from Buddah, the label forced the band to record side projects while the dispute was settled. Between 1978 and 1980, Knight released two solo albums and the Pips released two side albums. In a segment for Richard Pryor's TV special, the Pips (minus Gladys) appeared on his show performing their backup verses for the songs "I Heard It Through the Grapevine" and "Midnight Train to Georgia"; during parts where Gladys would sing, the camera panned on a lone-standing microphone. The group still performed together during this period, which ended with the group signing with Columbia Records in 1980.

=== Later years and disbandment (1980–1989) ===
In 1980, having signed with Columbia, the group reunited with their old Motown collaborators Ashford & Simpson, recording and releasing the album, About Love, which included the charted singles "Taste of Bitter Love", "Bourgie, Bourgie" and "Landlord". They continued the collaboration with the duo on their 1981 follow-up, Touch, which included the single "I Will Fight", and a cover of "I Will Survive". Also in 1981, the group provided prominent backing vocals for Kenny Rogers on his remake of Bobby "Blue" Bland's "Share Your Love with Me". The group had appeared on Rogers' television show with the First Edition several times in the early 1970s, and Knight guested on Rogers' TV special, Kenny Rogers Classic Weekend in 1986, performing a duet of "Am I Too Late?", a song both singers had previously recorded. Three years later she also collaborated with Rogers on the US Billboard AC top-ten single "If I Knew Then What I Know Now".

Following a year-long international tour, the group recorded their third Columbia album, Visions, in 1983. The leading single, "Save the Overtime (For Me)", gave the group their first number one R&B single in eight years. The video accompanying the song became among the earliest R&B videos to incorporate elements of hip-hop culture. The album also included the R&B hit "You're Number One (In My Book)". After Knight partook in solo projects, including a number one Billboard Hot 100 and R&B hit collaboration on the song, "That's What Friends Are For", the group signed with MCA Records and released their final album All Our Love in 1987. The album was certified gold and included the hits "Lovin' On Next to Nothin'" and their Grammy-winning number-one single, "Love Overboard". In 1988 the band also won a Soul Train Music Award for Career Achievement. Gladys Knight & the Pips embarked on their final tour in 1988 and disbanded upon its conclusion, as Knight decided she wanted to pursue a solo career, ending a 37-year tenure.

=== Honors, solo careers and deaths ===
Following the group's amicable disbandment in 1989, Edward Patten and William Guest formed their own production company in Detroit, titled Guest and Patten Productions, later renamed the Crew Entertainment Company. Patten was diagnosed with diabetes, which led to amputations of his legs. He died of complications from the disease on February 25, 2005, in Livonia, Michigan. William Guest continued to lead the company with members of Patten's family until his death from congestive heart failure in Detroit on December 24, 2015. Two years prior, Guest and his sister, Dame Dhyana Ziegler, PhD, released his autobiography, Midnight Train FROM Georgia: A Pip's Journey (Branden Books, Boston, MA, USA), about his life and career. In 2007, Bubba Knight and Guest, along with a third man, Neil Taffe (one of Gladys Knight's background singers), appeared in a commercial for Geico. On August 23, 1997, original Pips member Eleanor Guest died of heart failure. Langston George died on March 19, 2007, from congestive heart failure.

Bubba Knight still continues to oversee his sister's career, by being her tour manager and occasionally joining Gladys onstage during performances. Gladys Knight recorded the theme song for the James Bond film, Licence to Kill in 1989, which became a top ten single in the UK. Two years later, she released her 1991 album, Good Woman, which included the top five R&B hit, "Men", and Grammy-nominated duet version of "Superwoman", recorded with Dionne Warwick and Patti LaBelle. A 1994 album, Just for You, featured the hits "I Don't Wanna Know" and her cover of Boyz II Men's "End of the Road", and went gold. Knight still records and performs today. As a member of the Church of Jesus Christ of Latter-day Saints, she sometimes leads the Saints Unified Voices choir.

The group was inducted into the Rock and Roll Hall of Fame in 1996, the Vocal Group Hall of Fame in 2001 and received a Lifetime Achievement Award from the Rhythm & Blues Foundation in 1998. Gladys Knight & the Pips are ranked as the ninth most successful act in The Billboard Top 40 Book of R&B and Hip-Hop Hits (2005). They were also ranked number 91 on VH1's Top 100 Artists of Rock n' Roll. In June 2006, Gladys Knight & the Pips were inducted into the Apollo Theater's Hall of Fame in New York City. In 2017 the group was inducted into Rhythm & Blues Hall of Fame.

== Members ==
- Gladys Knight – lead vocals (1952–1962, 1964–1989)
- Merald "Bubba" Knight – lead and backing vocals (1952–1989)
- William Guest – lead and backing vocals (1952–1989; died 2015)
- Edward Patten – lead and backing vocals (1959–1989; died 2005)
- Brenda Knight – backing vocals (1952–1959)
- Eleanor Guest – backing vocals (1952–1959; died 1997)
- Langston George – backing vocals (1959–1962; died 2007)

Timeline

== Discography ==
=== Top 20 singles ===
The following singles reached the Top 20 on either the United States Billboard Hot 100 Pop Singles Chart or the United Kingdom Pop Singles Chart.

Year	Song title	US Pop Charts	US R&B Charts	UK Singles Chart	Canada CHUM/RPM
1961	"Every Beat of My Heart"	6	1	–	20
1961	"Letter Full of Tears"	19	3	–	–
1967	"Take Me in Your Arms and Love Me"	98	–	13	–
1967	"I Heard It Through the Grapevine"	2	1	47	5
1968	"The End of Our Road"	15	5	–	12
1969	"The Nitty Gritty"	19	2	–	27
1969	"Friendship Train"	17	2	–	29
1970	"If I Were Your Woman"	9	1	–	23
1971	"I Don't Want to Do Wrong"	17	2	–	30
1972	"Help Me Make It Through the Night"	33	13	11	64
1973	"Neither One of Us (Wants to Be the First to Say Goodbye)"	2	1	31	16
1973	"Daddy Could Swear, I Declare"	19	2	–	
1973	"Midnight Train to Georgia"	1	1	10 (1976 reissue)	5
1973	"I've Got to Use My Imagination"	4	1	–	25
1974	"Best Thing That Ever Happened to Me"	3	1	7	6
1974	"On and On"	5	2	–	13
1974	"I Feel a Song (In My Heart)"	21	–	–	13
1975	"The Way We Were/Try to Remember"	11	6	4	29
1976	"So Sad the Song"	47	12	20	–
1977	"Baby, Don't Change Your Mind"	52	10	4	58
1978	"Come Back and Finish What You Started"	–	–	15	–
1987	"Love Overboard"	13	1	42	59

=== Studio albums ===
- Letter Full of Tears (1962)
- Gladys Knight and the Pips (1965)
- Everybody Needs Love (1967)
- Feelin' Bluesy (1968)
- Silk 'n' Soul (1968)
- All In A Knight's Work (1968)
- Nitty Gritty (1969)
- All The Greatest Hits (1970)
- If I Were Your Woman (1971)
- Standing Ovation (1971)
- Neither One of Us (1973)
- Anthology (1973)
- All I Need Is Time (1973)
- Imagination (1973)
- Claudine (1974)
- I Feel a Song (1974)
- Presenting Gladys Knight and the Pips (1974)
- Bless This House (1975)
- 2nd Anniversary (1975)
- Original Soundtrack for the Motion Picture Pipe Dreams (1976)
- Still Together (1977)
- The One and Only (1978)
- About Love (1980)
- Touch (1981)
- That Special Time of Year (1982)
- Visions (1983)
- Life (1985)
- All Our Love (1987)

== Filmography ==
=== Concert ===
- 1977: Gladys Knight & the Pips feat. Ray Charles: Live at the Greek Theatre in Los Angeles
- 2021: Summer of Soul

=== Compilations ===
- 1973: Burt Sugarman's Midnight Special – Legendary Performances 1973
- 2004: Kenny Rogers Rollin' Vol. 1
- 2006: Flashbacks: Soul Sensation

== Awards and achievements ==
=== American Music Awards ===
Year	Nominee / work	Award	Result
1975	Gladys Knight & the Pips	Favorite Pop/Rock Band/Duo/Group	Won
1975	Gladys Knight & the Pips	Favorite Soul/R&B Band/Duo/Group	Won
1975	"Midnight Train to Georgia"	Favorite Soul/R&B Single	Won
1975	Imagination	Favorite Soul/R&B Album	Won
1976	Gladys Knight & the Pips	Favorite Soul/R&B Band/Duo/Group	Won
1984	Gladys Knight & the Pips	Favorite Soul/R&B Band/Duo/Group	Won
1989	Gladys Knight & the Pips	Favorite Soul/R&B Band/Duo/Group	Won

=== Grammy Awards ===
Year	Nominee / work	Award	Result
1969	"Friendship Train"	Best R&B Vocal Performance by a Duo or Group	Nominated
1971	"If I Were Your Woman"	Best R&B Vocal Performance by a Group	Nominated
1972	"Help Me Make It Through the Night"	Best R&B Vocal Performance by a Duo, Group or Chorus	Nominated
1973	"Midnight Train to Georgia"	Best R&B Vocal Performance by a Duo, Group or Chorus	Won
1973	"Neither One of Us (Wants to Be the First to Say Goodbye)"	Best Pop Vocal Performance by a Duo, Group or Chorus	Won
1974	"I Feel a Song (In My Heart)"	Best R&B Vocal Performance by a Duo, Group or Chorus	Nominated
1975	"The Way We Were"/"Try to Remember"	Best Pop Vocal Performance by a Duo, Group or Chorus	Nominated
1977	"Baby Don't Change Your Mind"	Best R&B Vocal Performance by a Duo, Group or Chorus	Nominated
1980	"About Love"	Best R&B Performance by a Duo or Group with Vocal	Nominated
1988	"Love Overboard"	Best R&B Performance by a Duo or Group with Vocal	Won

Gladys Knight has received an additional four Grammy Awards as a solo artist/collaborator.

=== Other awards and inductions ===
- 1988 Gladys Knight & the Pips received the Heritage Award (Later renamed the Quincy Jones Award for Career Achievement) at the Soul Train Music Awards.
- 1989 Gladys Knight & the Pips inducted into the Georgia Music Hall of Fame.
- 1996 Gladys Knight & the Pips inducted into the Rock and Roll Hall of Fame.
- 1998 Gladys Knight & the Pips received Lifetime Achievement Award from the Rhythm and Blues Foundation.
- 1999 Gladys Knight & the Pips inducted into the GRAMMY Hall of Fame ("Midnight Train to Georgia").
- 2001 Gladys Knight & the Pips inducted into the Vocal Group Hall of Fame.
- 2006 Gladys Knight & the Pips inducted into the Apollo Theater's Hall of Fame.
- 2009 Gladys Knight & the Pips inducted into the Hit Parade Hall of Fame.
- 2018 Gladys Knight & The Pips are again inducted into the Grammy Hall of Fame ("I Heard It Through The Grapevine")

== Sources ==
- Talevski, Nick (October 7, 2010). Rock Obituaries – Knocking on Heaven's Door. Omnibus Press. p. 231. ISBN 978-1-84609-091-2.
