= Baby, Don't Change Your Mind =

Single by Gladys Knight & the Pips

from the album Still Together
- B-side: "I Love to Feel That Feeling"
- Released: 1977
- Genre: Disco; funk
- Length: 3:15
- Label: Buddah Records
- Songwriter: Van McCoy
- Producers: Van McCoy & Charles Kipps for McCoy-Kipps Productions, Inc.

Gladys Knight & the Pips singles chronology
"Nobody but You" (1977)	"Baby, Don't Change Your Mind" (1977)	"Home Is Where the Heart Is" (1977)

Licensed audio
- "Baby, Don't Change Your Mind (Audio)" on YouTube

"Baby, Don't Change Your Mind" is a 1977 single by Gladys Knight & the Pips from their album "Still Together". It was originally performed by The Stylistics on their 1976 album Fabulous. The song was written by Van McCoy, who had scored one hit song himself as an artist, with the song "The Hustle". "Baby, Don't Change Your Mind" would become a minor Hot 100 hit in the US for Gladys Knight and the Pips, reaching number 52. In the UK, it would become a top ten hit. McCoy would go on to write the song "Come Back and Finish What You Started" for Gladys Knight & the Pips in 1978, but it would fail to chart in the US but in the UK it reached #15.

"Baby, Don't Change Your Mind" reached number 4 in the UK, making it the group's last Top 5 hit in the UK. In the US, the song reached number 52 on the Hot 100 and number 10 on the US R&B Charts.

== Track listing ==
7″ single

1. "Baby, Don't Change Your Mind" – 3:15
2. "I Love to Feel That Feeling" – 3:30

== Charts ==
Chart (1977)	Peak position
Belgium (Ultratop 50 Flanders)	8
Belgium (Ultratop 50 Wallonia)	11
Canada Top Singles (RPM)	58
Ireland (IRMA)	7
Netherlands (Single Top 100)	4
UK Singles (Official Charts)	4
US Billboard Hot 100	52
US Hot R&B/Hip-Hop Songs (Billboard)	10
