= All I Need Is Time =

Studio album by Gladys Knight & the Pips
- Released: June 1973
- Genre: Soul
- Length: 33:33
- Label: Soul S 739L
- Producer: Joe Porter, Johnny Bristol, Clay McMurray, Hal Davis

Gladys Knight & the Pips chronology
Neither One of Us (1973)	All I Need Is Time (1973)	Imagination (1973)

Professional ratings
Review scores
Source	Rating
AllMusic	4.5/5 stars

All I Need Is Time is the tenth studio album by American R&B quartet Gladys Knight & the Pips, released in June 1973 (see 1973 in music) by Motown Records on the Soul Records label.

Shortly after Gladys Knight & the Pips switched to Buddah Records, their former label released this album. The title track "All I Need Is Time" was released as a single. Motown intended to release another single, "Here I Am Again", but it was cancelled.

The album contains the covers "Heavy Makes You Happy" (The Staple Singers) and "Thank You (Falletin Me Be Mice Elf Agin) (Sly and the Family Stone).

== Track listing ==
Side one
No.	Title	Writer(s)	Length
1.	"I'll Be Here (When You Get Home)"	David Jones, Jr.; Wade Brown, Jr.; Johnny Bristol	4:07
2.	"All I Need Is Time"	Bud Reneau	4:30
3.	"Heavy Makes You Happy"	Jeff Barry; Robert Bloom	3:45
4.	"The Only Time You Love Me Is When You're Losing Me"	Clay McMurray; Pam Sawyer; Marty Coleman	2:44
5.	"Here I Am Again"	Clay McMurray; Patricia Foster	3:40

Side two
No.	Title	Writer(s)	Length
1.	"There's a Lesson to Be Learned"	LaVerne Ware; Pam Sawyer	3:29
2.	"Oh! What a Love I Have Found"	Bud Reneau	4:04
3.	"The Singer"	Elliot Willensky	3:10
4.	"Thank You (Falettin Me Be Mice Elf Agin)"	Sylvester Stewart	4:00

== Personnel ==
Arrangers

- David Van DePitte - arrangement on "I'll Be Here (When You Get Home)"
- Artie Butler - arrangement on "All I Need Is Time" and "Oh! What a Love I Have Found"
- H.B. Barnum - arrangement on "Heavy Makes You Happy" and "The Only Time You Love Me Is When You're Losing Me"
- Tom Baird - arrangement on "Here I Am Again" and "There's a Lesson to Be Learned"
- James Anthony Carmichael - arrangement on "The Singer"
- Paul Riser - arrangement on Thank You "(Falettin Me Be Mice Elf Agin)"

== Charts ==
Chart (1973)	Peak position
US Billboard 200	70
US Top R&B/Hip-Hop Albums (Billboard)	14

=== Singles ===
Year	Single	Chart positions	
Year	Single	US	US R&B
1973	"All I Need Is Time"	61	28
