= If I Were Your Woman (song) =

1970 song performed by Gladys Knight & the Pips

Single by Gladys Knight & the Pips

from the album If I Were Your Woman
- B-side: "The Tracks of My Tears"
- Released: November 1970
- Recorded: March 13, 1970
- Studio: Hitsville USA, Detroit
- Genre: R&B; pop-soul
- Length: 3:14
- Label: Motown
- Songwriters: Gloria Jones; Clay McMurray; Pam Sawyer
- Producer: Clay McMurray

Gladys Knight & the Pips singles chronology
"You Need Love Like I Do (Don't You)" (1970)	"If I Were Your Woman" (1970)	"I Don't Want to Do Wrong" (1971)

Stephanie Mills singles chronology
"Secret Lady" (1987)	"If I Were Your Woman" (1988)	"Where Is the Love" (1988)

Music video
- "If I Were Your Woman" on YouTube

"If I Were Your Woman" is a song recorded by American family group Gladys Knight & the Pips. It was written by Pam Sawyer, Clay McMurray, and Gloria Jones, produced by McMurray and arranged by Paul Riser. Released in late 1970 from the album of the same title, it spent one week at number 1 on the Best Selling Soul Singles chart in January 1971. It was also successful on the Billboard Hot 100 singles chart, peaking at number 9.

== Chart history ==
Chart (1970–1971)	Peak position
Canada RPM Top Singles	23
U.S. Billboard Hot 100	9
U.S. Billboard Best Selling Soul Singles	1

== Later versions ==
=== Alicia Keys version ===
"If I Was Your Woman / Walk on By"

Song by Alicia Keys

from the album The Diary of Alicia Keys
- Studio: Kampo (New York, NY)
- Genre: R&B
- Length: 3:06
- Label: J
- Songwriters: Gloria Jones; Clarence McMurray; Pam Sawyer; Burt Bacharach; Hal David
- Producers: Alicia Keys; Easy Mo Bee; Dwayne "D. Wigg" Wiggins

Alicia Keys recorded a version of "If I Were Your Woman" in which she sampled the Isaac Hayes version of "Walk On By" for her second studio album The Diary of Alicia Keys (2003). Keys sampled the same loop of Hayes' song the Notorious B.I.G. sampled on his song "Warning", which was produced by Easy Mo Bee, who co-produced Keys' version. Keys would later record a full version of the song for her first live album Unplugged (2005); it received a nomination for Best Traditional R&B Vocal Performance at the 2006 Grammy Awards. Another version, entitled "If I Was Your Woman (Original Funky Demo Version)" appears on Songs in A Minor: 10th Anniversary Edition (2011). Keys stated that it was "dangerous" to record the song, and commented "when I do a remake, it's not about wondering how people will criticize it. It's a private choice". "If I Was Your Woman" was included on the set list of Keys' Diary Tour (2005).

"If I Was Your Woman" was generally well received by music critics in their reviews for The Diary of Alicia Keys. David Segal from The Washington Post commented that with the music from "Walk on By", the song is a "successful cross-breeding experiment". Mark Anthony Neal of PopMatters felt that the song was the "funkiest and most hip-hop inflected track" on the album, adding that it "forc[ed] Keys to push towards her highest vocal register". BBC Music reviewer Denise Boyd called it a "[song] to look out for" on the album. Dimitri Ehrlich of Vibe praised Keys' vocal in the song, writing "Her voice is low and full, brimming with emotion. Singing as if her life depended on every note, she makes sure you feel the urgency". Steve LaBate of Paste described the song as "a well-written soul-pop tune with a killer sitar hook and Keys’ chiming harp-like piano accents that eventually morph into sparse, pretty jazz chords during the verse" and concluded that it's one of the "stronger tracks" on the album. Jim Farber of the New York Daily News commented that Keys took a risk by covering the song, but concluded that "she makes it her own, putting more funk in the rhythm and finding new throatiness in her voice". Laura Sinagra of The Village Voice was not pleased with the song, writing that "Keys streets up Gladys Knight with "If I Was Your Woman" and might get fan points for effort, but her hip-hop "aw, aw, aw"s fail to convince".

=== Other recordings ===
- George Michael performed the song with a small adaptation of the lyrics ('If you were my woman') during the Nelson Mandela 70th Birthday Tribute at the Wembley Stadium on June 11, 1988. In 1990, the song was released as the B-side to the "Praying for Time" single.
- There have been numerous other versions, with the most notable one being by Stephanie Mills. Her version peaked at number 19 on the Hot Black Singles chart in 1988.
- Some years before, Latimore on his homonymous album of 1973, recorded this song with the title "If You Were My Woman" (number 70 R&B).
- On November 4, 2013, Tessanne Chin performed the song on Season 5 of NBC's singing competition, The Voice for the Live Top 10 round.

== See also ==
- Billboard Year-End Hot 100 singles of 1971
- List of number-one R&B singles of 1971 (U.S.)
