= Edward Patten =

American soul singer (1939–2005)

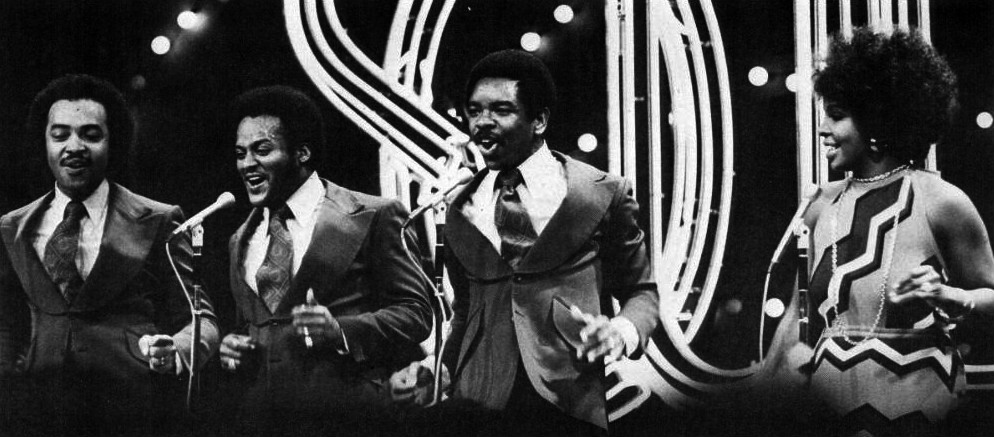
- Patten (second from left) with Gladys Knight & the Pips, 1974

Background information
- Born: Edward Roy Patten; August 27, 1939; Atlanta, Georgia, U.S.
- Died: February 25, 2005 (aged 65) Livonia, Michigan, U.S.
- Genres: R&B, pop music, soul music
- Occupations: Singer, songwriter, producer
- Formerly of: Gladys Knight & the Pips

Edward Roy Patten (August 27, 1939 – February 25, 2005) was an American R&B/soul singer, best known as a member of Gladys Knight & the Pips. He was a cousin of Gladys Knight. Patten was a member of the group from 1959 until the disbandment in 1989. Patten was a multiple Grammy Award winner, and along with the group, he was inducted to the Rock and Roll Hall of Fame in 1996.

== Biography ==
Edward Patten was born in Atlanta, Georgia, to Thomas S. Patten and Wilhelmina (née Maxwell). His father was a local musician, singer and bandleader. Edward grew up singing in the church and with local "doo-wop" groups in Atlanta. While still a teenager, he married his first wife Katherine (née Smith) in Atlanta at the home of her parents. He had two children from this marriage, Stephanie A. and Steven A. Patten.

It was in Atlanta that he was invited by William Guest to join the Pips after two members left the group to get married. Edward later traveled first to New York after the success of the single "Every Beat of My Heart", and later he and the group, now Gladys Knight & the Pips, moved to Detroit, Michigan, to join Motown Records. By this time, the strain of the entertainment world had taken its toll on his marriage, and he and Katherine divorced. Edward has a daughter in 1965 named Sonya A Patten. He married Renee (née Brown) Patten in 1968. He and Renee had three children: Edward II, Elliott and Renee Patten.

Even though Gladys Knight & the Pips officially disbanded in 1989, Patten remained very close to his bandmates and his lifelong friends throughout the rest of his life.

Patten had diabetes and hypertension and was later incapacitated by a stroke. He died following a stroke, at the age of 65, at St. Mary's Mercy Hospital in Livonia, Michigan, where he resided. He is interred at Detroit's historic Woodlawn Cemetery at Eight Mile Road and Woodward Avenue.
