= William Guest (singer) =

American soul singer (1941–2015)

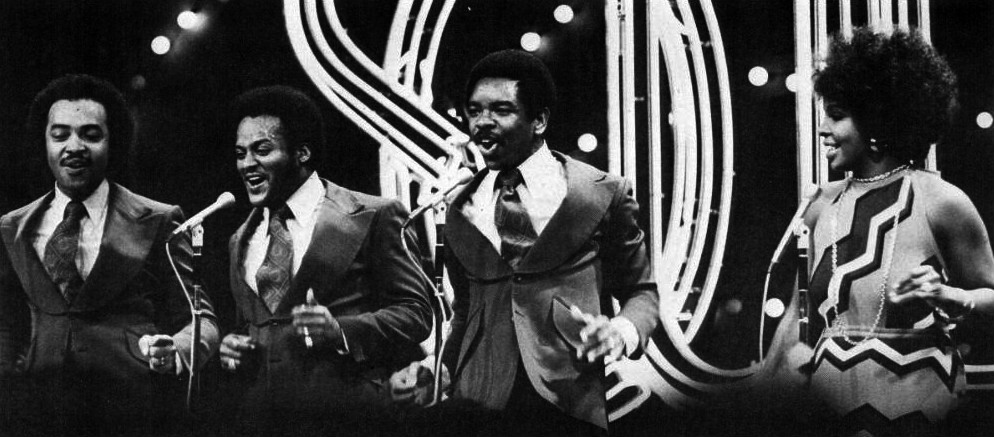
- Guest (left) with Gladys Knight & the Pips, 1974

Background information
- Born: William Franklin Guest; June 2, 1941; Atlanta, Georgia, U.S.
- Died: December 24, 2015 (aged 74) Detroit, Michigan, U.S.
- Genres: R&B, pop music
- Occupations: Singer, songwriter, producer
- Formerly of: Gladys Knight & the Pips

William Franklin Guest (July 2, 1941 – December 24, 2015) was an American R&B/soul singer best known as a member of Gladys Knight & the Pips along with his cousins Gladys Knight, Merald "Bubba" Knight and Edward Patten. Guest was a member of the group for its entire history, from 1952 to 1989. He is a multiple Grammy Award winner and was inducted to the Rock and Roll Hall of Fame with Gladys Knight & the Pips in 1996.

== Biography ==
Guest was born July 2, 1941 in Atlanta, Georgia. He was an original member of Gladys Knight & the Pips along with his sister Eleanor Guest and cousins Brenda, Gladys and Merald "Bubba" Knight. Guest had occasional lead recordings during the group's long career, including the 1964 B-side "Maybe Maybe Baby" to their original recording of "Giving Up" and "Window Raisin' Granny" from their 1973 hit album Imagination. "Window Raisin' Granny" was sampled by LL Cool J and Christina Aguilera among others. Following his stint with The Pips, Guest and fellow Pip Edward Patten formed Patten and Guest Productions, and following Patten's death in 2005, he continued to manage artists through the Crew Entertainment company he formed with members of Patten's family.

Guest died on December 24, 2015, of congestive heart failure in Detroit, Michigan, his home for fifty years. He was 74 years old. He is interred at South-View Cemetery in Atlanta.

== Awards ==
Guest was inducted to the Rock and Roll Hall of Fame with Gladys Knight & the Pips in 1996.

== Bibliography ==
- Guest, William Franklin; Ziegler, Dr. Dame Dhyana (2012). Midnight Train From Georgia: A Pip's Journey. Boston: Branden Books. ISBN 978-0828324694.
