= Bubba Knight =

American R&B/soul singer (born 1942)

Merald "Bubba" Knight
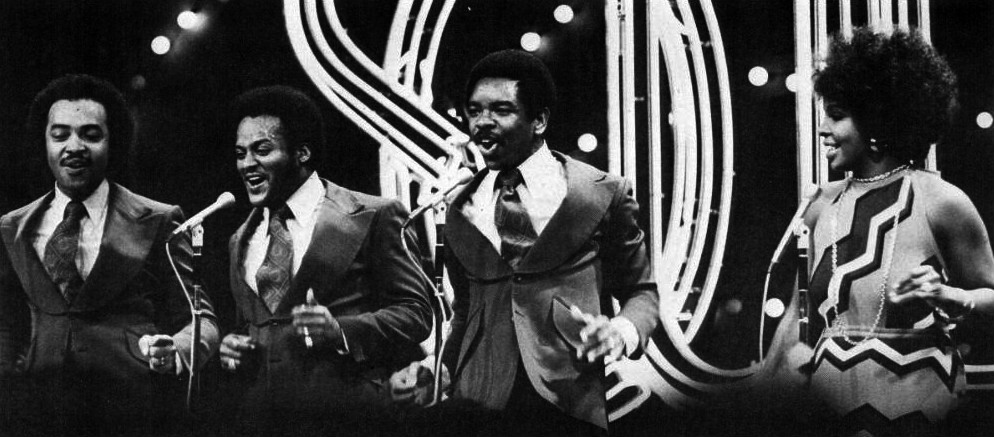
- Knight (second from right) with Gladys Knight & the Pips on Soul Train, 1974

Background information
- Also known as: Bubba
- Born: Merald Woodlow Knight, Jr. September 4, 1942 (age 83); Atlanta, Georgia, U.S.
- Genres: R&B, soul music
- Occupations: Singer, songwriter, producer

Merald Woodlow "Bubba" Knight, Jr. (born September 4, 1942) is an American R&B/soul singer, best known as a member of Gladys Knight & the Pips. The older brother of lead singer Gladys Knight, Bubba Knight served as the unofficial leader of the family group, and was instrumental in handling the Pips' business matters. "Gladys Knight & The Pips" evolved out of the Pips.

The original Pips formed in Atlanta, Georgia, in 1952, with Gladys, Bubba, sister Brenda, plus cousins Eleanor and William Guest singing supper-club material during the week, and gospel music on Sundays. Knight is a multiple Grammy Award winner, and he was inducted to the Rock and Roll Hall of Fame with Gladys Knight & the Pips in 1996.
