= Kostow Greenwood Architects =

Architecture firm in the United States

Kostow Greenwood Architects LLP, is a New York City-based architecture firm, specializing in broadcast and live arts facilities, interior architecture and historic preservation and renovation and urban revitalization projects. Serving commercial, nonprofit and institutional clients, the firm was founded in 1987, and is led by principals Michael Kostow and Jane Greenwood. Kostow Greenwood is a Minority and Women-owned Business Enterprise.

Kostow Greenwood is “known for their expertise in studio and theatre design" most notably for CNN’s New York City broadcast studios, which at the time of its construction, houses what is considered the largest newsroom on the East Coast of the United States, and sympathetic renovations of landmark New York City theater and auditorium buildings including many for The Shubert Organization, the Centennial Memorial Temple for the Salvation Army, the Federation of Protestant Welfare Agencies Headquarters, and the conversion of the Loew’s Metropolitan Theatre into the Brooklyn Tabernacle. Each of these three historic renovations received Lucy G. Moses Preservation Awards from the New York Landmarks Conservancy, its highest honors for excellence in preservation.

Michael Kostow holds a B.A. in Architecture from Lehigh University and a Masters in Architecture from Yale University. Jane Greenwood, who also serves as the firm's Managing Director, graduated from Pratt Institute School of Architecture. Both are LEED Accredited Professionals and members of the American Institute of Architects.

== Works ==
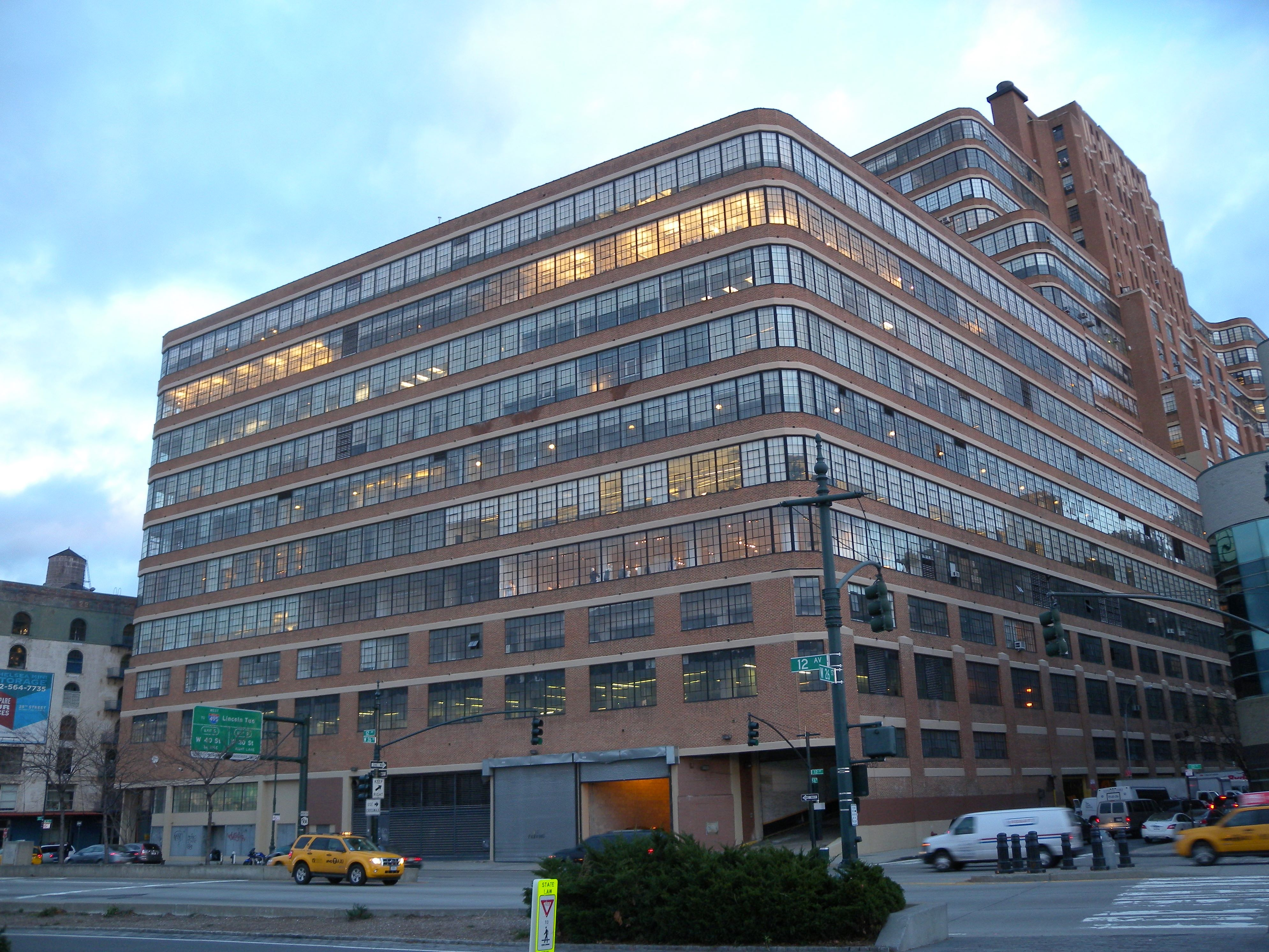
Starrett-Lehigh Building, site of an interiors project

- Verizon Media, New York
- Nevelson Chapel, New York
- VSP Global, New York
- Apollo Performing Arts Center, Harlem
- 92Y Tribeca Expansion and Remodel, 200 Hudson Street, New York, NY
- 109 Prince Street Retail and Residential Space, New York, NY
- 281 Park Avenue South Restoration of the Federation of Protestant Welfare Agencies's Headquarters, New York, NY
- Abu Dhabi Media Company Broadcasting Center, Abu Dhabi, United Arab Emirates Estimated completion date: 2015
- "Actors’ Equity Association (AEA)" Headquarters and Studios, Times Square, New York, NY
- Bethworks-Sands Restoration and Development of the Former Bethlehem Steel Site, Bethlehem, Pennsylvania
- Brooklyn Tabernacle Campus, Brooklyn, New York
- Centennial Memorial Temple Restoration of art deco auditorium of The Salvation Army’s NYC regional headquarters building, 120 West 14th St., New York, NY
- CNN Production Hub, Time Warner Center, New York, NY
- Fir Tree Partners Company Offices, New York, NY
- Villanova University Department of Communication Studio and Multimedia Complex, Villanova, PA
- HBO Production Facility, New York, NY
- House of the New York City Bar Association Expansion and Renovation of Cyrus Eidlitz's 1895 New York City Landmark Building, 42 West 44th Street, New York, NY
- Cannon Street Station Development of the Waterfront of New Bedford, MA, New Bedford, MA
- La Marqueta, Renovation for the NYCEDC, New York, NY
- Loew's Metropolitan Restoration for the Brooklyn Tabernacle, 392 Fulton Street, Brooklyn, NY
- Longacre Theatre Restoration, New York, NY
- M&C Saatchi Company Offices, New York, NY
- Mad River Post Video Post-Production Facility, New York, NY
- Manhattan Neighborhood Network Public Access Television Station Facility and Youth Media Center, New York, NY
- MTV Central Editing Facility, New York, NY
- Nickelodeon Production Facility for Blue's Clues program, New York, NY
- Night & Day High School Expansion and Renovation of the Manhattan Comprehensive Night and Day High School, New York, NY
- Riverwalk Casino Development and Expansion of the Power Plant in Wilmington, DE, Wilmington, DE
- SiriusXM New York Headquarters and Broadcast Center, New York, NY
- Smart Design - Starrett-Lehigh Building New York, NY
- Social Science Research Council Company Offices, New York, NY
- Steelstacks Cultural, Performing Arts and Broadcast Center with PBS Channel 39 and ArtsQuest, Bethlehem, Pennsylvania
- WNYC Radio and Multimedia Performance Space, New York, NY

== Awards ==
Crain's New York names The Shop East at VSP Global as one of the "5 Coolest Offices", 2018,

OUT 100 names Jane Greenwood as one of our most inspiring leaders, 2017,

SANDI / IIDA Project of the Year, 2015, International Interior Design Association South Florida Chapter, Fir Tree Partners Miami

ULI Global Awards for Excellence Winner, 2014, Urban Land Institute, SteelStacks Art and Cultural Campus

Lucy G. Moses Preservation Award, 2013, The New York Landmarks Conservancy, Centennial Memorial Temple at the Salvation Army NY Regional Headquarters

Annual Building Award, New Construction, 2007, Queens Chamber of Commerce, Cambria Heights Library

Design Honor Award for Religious Art and Architecture, 2003, Interfaith Forum on Religion, Art, and Architecture (IFRAA)/Faith & Form, Loew’s Metropolitan Theater / Brooklyn Tabernacle

Building Brooklyn Award, Community Facility 2003, The Brooklyn Chamber of Commerce, Loew’s Metropolitan Theater / Brooklyn Tabernacle

New Studio Excellence Award, 2002, Broadcast Engineering, MTV Networks

Lucy G. Moses Preservation Award, 2002, The New York Landmarks Conservancy, Loew’s Metropolitan Theater / Brooklyn Tabernacle

Lucy G. Moses Preservation Award, 1994, The New York Landmarks Conservancy, Federation of Protestant Welfare Agencies Headquarters

Certificate of Merit, 1994, New York City Landmarks Preservation Commission, 109 Prince Street

Citation of Merit, 1993, The Victorian Society in America, 109 Prince Street
