= 109 Prince Street =

Building in Manhattan, New York

Coordinates: 40°43′30.8″N 73°59′57.8″W

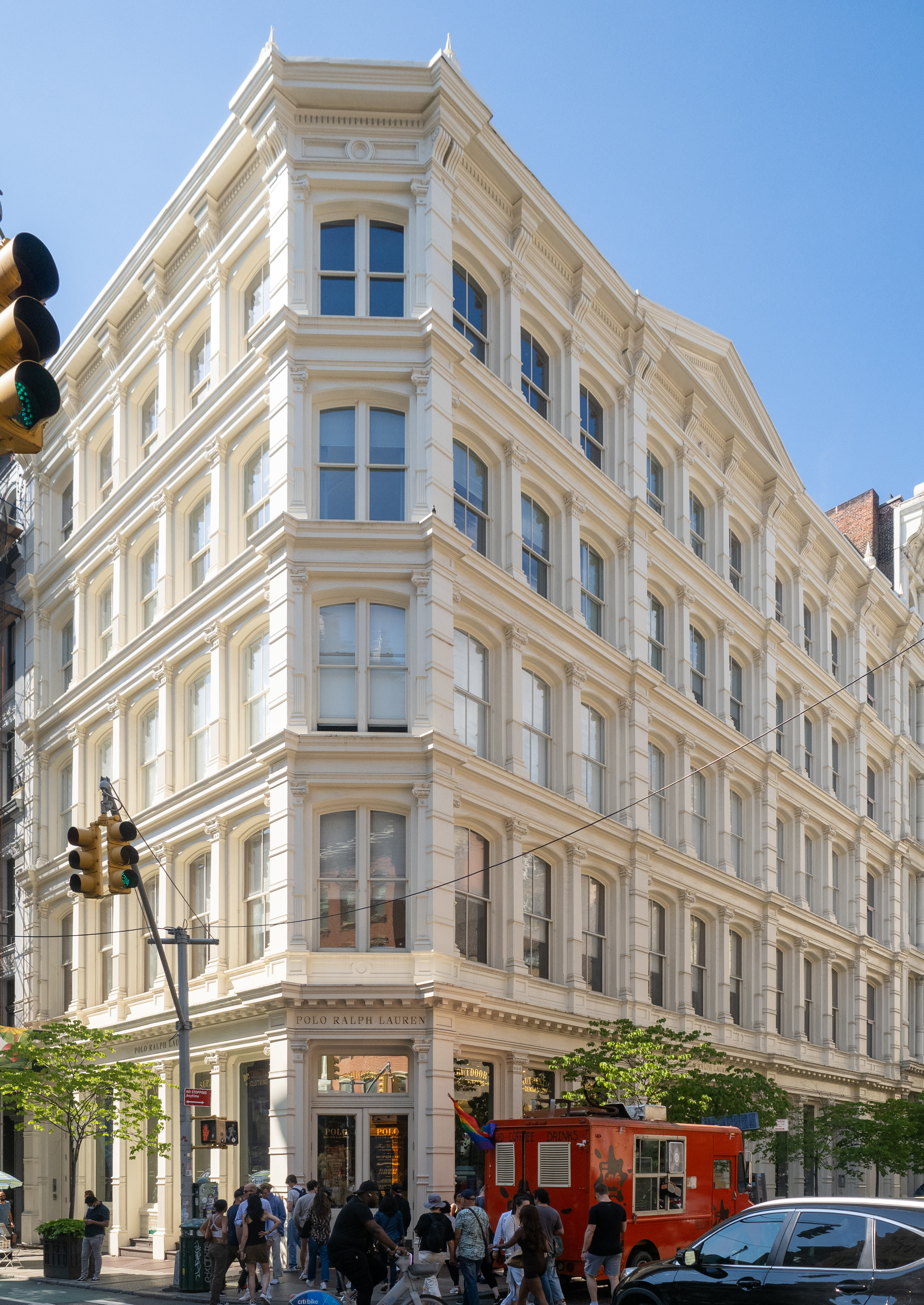
- Interactive map of the 109 Prince Street area

General information
- Architectural style: French Renaissance
- Location: 109 Prince Street; Manhattan, New York City, New York
- Construction started: 1882
- Completed: 1883

Height
- Height: 55 feet (17 m)

Technical details
- Floor count: 5

Design and construction
- Architect: Jarvis Morgan Slade

109 Prince Street at the corner of Greene Street – where it is #119 – in the SoHo neighborhood of Manhattan, New York City is a historic cast-iron building. It was built in 1882–83 and was designed by Jarvis Morgan Slade in the French Renaissance style. The cast-iron facade was provided by the architectural iron works firm of Cheney & Hewlett.

The building, originally a store, has been described as one of the most striking gems of the 19th century cast iron architecture in the world. Completely restored in 1993 by architecture firm Kapell & Kostow, it was awarded the Landmark Certificate of Merit by the New York City Landmarks Preservation Commission in 1994. It is located within the SoHo - Cast Iron Historic District.
