= Greatest Hits II (The Temptations album) =

Greatest hits album by The Temptations
- Released: September 8, 1970
- Recorded: 1966–1970
- Studios: Hitsville USA, Detroit
- Genre: Soul/Psychedelic soul
- Length: 40:22
- Labels: Gordy; GS 954
- Producer: Norman Whitfield

The Temptations chronology
Psychedelic Shack (1970)	Greatest Hits II (1970)	Live at London's Talk of the Town (1970)

Singles from Greatest Hits II
- 1. "Ball of Confusion (That's What the World Is Today)" Released: May 7, 1970

Professional ratings
Review scores
Source	Rating
AllMusic	3/5 stars
Christgau's Record Guide	A−

Greatest Hits II (shown as Temptations Greatest Hits Vol. 2 on the label) is a 1970 greatest hits album for The Temptations, released by the Gordy (Motown) label. The sequel to the first Temptations greatest hits LP from 1966, Greatest Hits II collects several of the late-1960s hits that followed the release of the first compilation. Included here are the final collection of David Ruffin-led singles, including "(I Know) I'm Losing You", "I Wish It Would Rain" and "I Could Never Love Another (After Loving You)", and the first of the Dennis Edwards-led psychedelic soul records, including "Cloud Nine" and "Psychedelic Shack". A new non-album single, the #3 hit "Ball of Confusion (That's What the World Is Today)", is also included.

All of the songs included here were produced by Norman Whitfield. Not included are "All I Need", a 1967 hit single produced by Frank Wilson, or the collection of duets singles with Diana Ross & the Supremes such as "I'm Gonna Make You Love Me" that were produced by Wilson and Nickolas Ashford.

== Track listing ==
=== Side one ===
1. "Cloud Nine" (Barrett Strong, Norman Whitfield) (lead singers: Dennis Edwards, Paul Williams, Melvin Franklin, Eddie Kendricks, Otis Williams) – 3:27
2. "I Wish It Would Rain" (Roger Penzabene, Strong, Whitfield) (lead singer: David Ruffin) – 2:48
3. "Ball of Confusion (That's What the World Is Today)" (Strong, Whitfield) (lead singers: Eddie Kendricks, Dennis Edwards, Paul Williams, Melvin Franklin, Otis Williams) – 4:05
4. "(I Know) I'm Losing You" (Cornelius Grant, Eddie Holland, Whitfield) (lead singer: David Ruffin) – 2:28
5. "I Can't Get Next to You" (Strong, Whitfield) (lead singers: Dennis Edwards, Melvin Franklin, Eddie Kendricks, Paul Williams, Otis Williams) – 2:52
6. "You're My Everything" (Grant, Penzabene, Whitfield) (lead singers: Eddie Kendricks; bridge vocals: David Ruffin) – 2:58

=== Side two ===
1. "Psychedelic Shack" (Strong, Whitfield) (lead singers: Dennis Edwards, Melvin Franklin, Eddie Kendricks, Paul Williams, Otis Williams) – 3:53
2. "Please Return Your Love to Me" (Strong, Whitfield, Barbara Neely) (lead singer: Eddie Kendricks) – 2:21
3. "Runaway Child, Running Wild" (Strong, Whitfield) (lead singers: Dennis Edwards, Paul Williams, Eddie Kendricks, Melvin Franklin, Otis Williams) – 4:47
4. "I Could Never Love Another (After Loving You)" (Penzabene, Strong, Whitfield) (lead singer: David Ruffin) – 3:15
5. "Don't Let the Joneses Get You Down" (Strong, Whitfield) (lead singers: Dennis Edwards, Melvin Franklin, Eddie Kendricks, Paul Williams, Otis Williams) – 4:43
6. "(Loneliness Made Me Realize) It's You That I Need" (Holland, Whitfield) (lead singer: David Ruffin; last verse: Paul Williams, Eddie Kendricks, Melvin Franklin, Otis Williams) – 2:36

== See also ==
- Greatest Hits (Vol. 1)
