= The Ultimate Collection (The Temptations album) =

1995 compilation album by the Temptations

Compilation album by The Temptations
- Released: March 25, 1997
- Recorded: 1964–1994
- Genre: Soul music
- Length: 71:09
- Label: Motown Records
- Producer: Harry Weinger

The Temptations chronology
Anthology (version 3) (1995)	The Ultimate Collection (1997)	Lost and Found: You've Got to Earn It (1962-1968) (1999)

Professional ratings
Review scores
Source	Rating
Allmusic	5/5 stars

The Ultimate Collection is a compilation album by The Temptations, released on Motown Records.

== Personnel ==
- Otis Williams — vocals
- Melvin Franklin — vocals
- David Ruffin — vocals tracks 1–12, 21
- Eddie Kendricks — vocals tracks 1–16, 21
- Paul Williams — vocals tracks 1–16, 21
- Dennis Edwards — vocals tracks 13–18
- Richard Street — vocals tracks 17–19
- Damon Harris — vocals tracks 17–18
- Ali-Ollie Woodson — vocals tracks 19–20
- Ron Tyson — vocals tracks 19–20
- Theo Peoples — vocals track 20
- The Andantes — vocals track 3
- The Funk Brothers — instruments tracks 1–17
- Members of the Detroit Symphony Orchestra conducted by Gordon Staples — strings

== Track listing ==
Singles chart peak positions from Billboard charts; no R&B chart existed from November 30, 1963, through January 23, 1965.

Track	Catalogue	Release date	Pop Chart	R&B Chart	Song title	Writer(s)	Time
1.	Gordy 7028	1/23/64	No. 11		"The Way You Do the Things You Do"	Smokey Robinson and Robert Rogers	2:39
2.	Gordy 7038	12/21/64	No. 1	No. 1	"My Girl"	Smokey Robinson and Ronald White	2:40
3.	Gordy 7040	3/18/65	No. 18	No. 3	"It's Growing"	Smokey Robinson and Warren Moore	2:57
4.	Gordy 7043	6/1/65	No. 17	No. 4	"Since I Lost My Baby"	Smokey Robinson and Warren Moore	2:49
5.	Gordy 7047b	9/30/65	No. 83	No. 15	"Don't Look Back"	Smokey Robinson and Ronald White	2:53
6.	Gordy 7049	2/7/66	No. 29	No. 1	"Get Ready"	Smokey Robinson	2:35
7.	Gordy 7054	5/3/66	No. 13	No. 1	"Ain't Too Proud to Beg"	Edward Holland Jr. and Norman Whitfield	2:32
8.	Gordy 7057	11/2/66	No. 8	No. 1	"(I Know) I'm Losing You"	Edward Holland Jr., Norman Whitfield, Cornelius Grant	2:26
9.	Gordy 7061	4/13/67	No. 8	No. 2	"All I Need"	Edward Holland Jr., R. Dean Taylor, Frank Wilson	3:17
10.	Gordy 7063	6/13/67	No. 6	No. 3	"You're My Everything"	Norman Whitfield, Roger Penzabene, Cornelius Grant	3:12
11.	Motown 530338	9/20/94			"Angel Doll"	Stevie Wonder, Clarence Paul, Morris Broadnax	2:29
12.	Gordy 7068	12/21/67	No. 4	No. 1	"I Wish It Would Rain"	Norman Whitfield, Barrett Strong, Roger Penzabene	2:53
13.	Gordy 7081	10/25/68	No. 6	No. 2	"Cloud Nine"	Norman Whitfield and Barrett Strong	3:35
14.	Gordy 7093	7/30/69	No. 1	No. 1	"I Can't Get Next to You"	Norman Whitfield and Barrett Strong	2:52
15.	Gordy 7099	5/7/70	No. 3	No. 2	"Ball of Confusion (That's What the World Is Today)"	Norman Whitfield and Barrett Strong	4:01
16.	Gordy 7105	1/14/71	No. 1	No. 1	"Just My Imagination (Running Away with Me)"	Norman Whitfield and Barrett Strong	3:52
17.	Gordy 7121	7/28/72	No. 1	No. 5	"Papa Was a Rollin' Stone"	Norman Whitfield and Barrett Strong	6:57
18.	Gordy 7142	2/17/75	No. 26	No. 1	"Shakey Ground"	Jeffrey Bowen, Eddie Hazel, Al Boyd	4:02
19.	Gordy 1765	10/1/84	No. 48	No. 2	"Treat Her Like a Lady"	Otis Williams and Ali-Ollie Woodson	4:42
20.	Motown 2269	9/27/94		No. 86	"Error of Our Ways"	Otis Williams, Dennis Nelson, Melvin Franklin	5:19
21.	Motown 530338	9/20/94			"My Girl" (Acapella) [Excerpt]	Smokey Robinson and Ronald White	1:20
