= Live at London's Talk of the Town (The Temptations album) =

Live album by The Temptations
- Released: July 24, 1970
- Recorded: January 1970
- Venues: Talk of the Town, London, England
- Genres: Soul, funk
- Labels: Gordy; GS 953
- Producer: Norman Smith

The Temptations chronology
Greatest Hits II (1970)	Live at London's Talk of the Town (1970)	The Temptations Christmas Card (1970)

Professional ratings
Review scores
Source	Rating
Allmusic	3/5 stars

Live at London's Talk of The Town is a 1970 live album recorded by The Temptations at the Talk of the Town nightclub in London, England. It was the final live album released by the group for over thirty years, until The Temptations in Japan, recorded in 1973, was released in 2004. The album reached No. 21 on the Billboard 200 Pop Album Chart, and No. 5 on its R&B album chart.

The songs performed included Temptations hits such as "My Girl", "I Can't Get Next to You" and "Cloud Nine".

Despite this album's success, as of 2016, it has never been released in the CD format. However its tracks are available for sale as a digital download, available on Amazon, iTunes, and other websites.

== Track listing ==
1. "Get Ready" (Smokey Robinson) (lead: Eddie Kendricks)
2. "Girl (Why You Wanna Make Me Blue)" (Norman Whitfield, Eddie Holland) (lead: Eddie Kendricks)
3. "Beauty Is Only Skin Deep" (Whitfield, Holland) (lead: Dennis Edwards)
4. "You're My Everything" (Roger Penzabene, Cornelius Grant, Whitfield) (lead: Eddie Kendricks, Dennis Edwards)
5. "My Girl" (Robinson, Ronnie White) (lead: Paul Williams)
6. "Ain't to Proud To Beg" (Holland, Whitfield) (lead: Dennis Edwards)
7. "I'm Gonna Make You Love Me" (Kenny Gamble, Leon Huff, Jerry Ross) (lead: Eddie Kendricks)
8. "The Impossible Dream" (Mitch Leigh, Joe Darion) (lead: Paul Williams)
9. "Runaway Child, Running Wild" (Whitfield, Barrett Strong) (lead: Dennis Edwards, Paul Williams, Eddie Kendricks, Melvin Franklin, Otis Williams)
10. "Don't Let the Joneses Get You Down" (Whitfield, Strong) (lead: Dennis Edwards, Melvin Franklin, Eddie Kendricks, Paul Williams, Otis Williams)
11. "A Time For Us" (Nino Rota, Henry Mancini) (lead: Eddie Kendricks)
12. "I Can't Get Next To You" (Whitfield, Strong) (lead: Dennis Edwards, Melvin Franklin, Eddie Kendricks, Paul Williams, Otis Williams)
13. "This Guy's In Love With You" (Burt Bacharach, Hal David) (lead: Otis Williams)
14. "Introduction of Band and Group"
15. "I've Gotta Be Me" (Walter Marks) (lead: Paul Williams)
16. "(I Know) I'm Losing You" (Grant, Whitfield, Holland) (lead: Dennis Edwards)
17. "Cloud Nine" (lead: Dennis Edwards, Paul Williams, Eddie Kendricks, Melvin Franklin, Otis Williams)
18. "Everything Is Going To Be Alright" (lead: Dennis Edwards)

== Personnel ==
- Burt Rhodes and His Orchestra
- Cornelius Grant – lead guitar, musical director
- Bill White – bass
- Melvin Brown – drums
- Stacey Edwards – congas

The Temptations:

- Otis Williams – second tenor/baritone
- Melvin Franklin – bass
- Eddie Kendricks – first tenor/falsetto
- Paul Williams – second tenor/baritone
- Dennis Edwards – tenor/baritone
