= Live at the Copa (The Temptations album) =

Live album by The Temptations
- Released: December 9, 1968
- Recorded: 1968
- Venue: The Copacabana, New York City
- Genres: Soul, pop
- Labels: Gordy; GS 938

The Temptations chronology
TCB (1968)	Live at the Copa (1968)	Cloud Nine (1969)

Professional ratings
Review scores
Source	Rating
Allmusic	4/5 stars

Live at the Copa is a 1968 live album recorded by The Temptations at the Copacabana supper club in New York City. Released in 1968 by Gordy (Motown) Records, Live at the Copa features new lead singer Dennis Edwards in place of David Ruffin. Edwards' first studio album with the Temptations would be the group's next album, 1969's Cloud Nine.

== Track listing ==
=== Side one ===
1. Introduction
2. "Get Ready" (Smokey Robinson) (lead singer: Eddie Kendricks)
3. "You're My Everything" (Cornelius Grant, Roger Penzabene, Norman Whitfield) (lead singers: Eddie Kendricks, Dennis Edwards)
4. "I Truly, Truly Believe" (George Gordy, Margaret Gordy, Allen Story) (lead singer: Melvin Franklin)
5. "I Wish It Would Rain" (Penzabene, Barrett Strong, Whitfield) (lead singer: Dennis Edwards)
6. "For Once in My Life" (Ron Miller, Orlando Murden) (lead singer: Paul Williams, last line: Otis Williams)
7. "I Could Never Love Another (After Loving You)" (Penzabene, Strong, Whitfield) (lead singer: Dennis Edwards)

=== Side two ===
1. Introduction of Band and Group
2. "Hello, Young Lovers" (Oscar Hammerstein II, Richard Rodgers) (lead singer: The Temptations)
3. "With These Hands" (Benny Davis, Abner Silver) (lead singer: Eddie Kendricks)
4. "Swanee" (Irving Caesar, George Gershwin) (lead singer: The Temptations)
5. "The Impossible Dream" (Mitch Leigh, Joe Darion) (lead singer: Dennis Edwards)
6. "Please Return Your Love to Me" (Strong, Whitfield) (lead singer: Eddie Kendricks)
7. "(I Know) I'm Losing You" (Grant, Edward Holland Jr., Whitfield) (lead singer: Dennis Edwards)
