= The Temptations Wish It Would Rain =

Studio album by The Temptations
- Released: April 29, 1968
- Recorded: February 1967 – February 1968
- Studio: Hitsville USA, Detroit
- Genre: Soul
- Length: 32:00
- Label: Gordy; GS 927
- Producer: Norman Whitfield, Smokey Robinson, Henry Cosby, Harvey Fuqua, Deke Richards, Johnny Bristol

The Temptations chronology
The Temptations in a Mellow Mood (1967)	The Temptations Wish It Would Rain (1968)	Diana Ross & the Supremes Join the Temptations (1968)

Singles from The Temptations Wish It Would Rain
- 1. "I Wish It Would Rain" Released: December 21, 1967; 2. "I Could Never Love Another (After Loving You)" Released: April 18, 1968; 3. "Please Return Your Love to Me" Released: July 16, 1968

Professional ratings
Review scores
Source	Rating
AllMusic	4.5/5 stars
The Rolling Stone Album Guide	3/5 stars

The Temptations Wish It Would Rain is the seventh studio album by the Temptations, released in 1968 via Gordy Records. It was the final release from the group's "Classic-5" era, during which David Ruffin, Eddie Kendricks, Paul Williams, Melvin Franklin, and Otis Williams constituted the Temptations' lineup.

Wish It Would Rain also marks the last Temptations solo album to focus on the classic "Motown Sound", and the last to feature production from Smokey Robinson.

== Overview ==
Included on Wish It Would Rain are the hit singles "I Wish It Would Rain" and "I Could Never Love Another (After Loving You)", both featuring Ruffin on lead vocals and co-written by Motown writer Rodger Penzabene, who committed suicide on New Year's Eve 1967 because of the breakup described in these two songs. "I Wish It Would Rain's" b-side, "I Truly, Truly Believe", is a rare solo showcase for Franklin, the group's bass singer.

The third single, "Please Return Your Love to Me", features Kendricks on lead, and was released in July after Ruffin's departure. The song's b-side, "How Could I Forget" (led by Paul Williams), is not included here, because it was newly recorded on June 29 to accompany the a-side.

== Background ==
Ruffin himself did not sing on "How Can I Forget" because, by late June, he was no longer part of the Temptations. The group had already been dealing with Ruffin's ego clashes and his desire for special treatment for at least a few months, and warded off his desire to have the name of the group changed to "David Ruffin & the Temptations" (in response to The Supremes being renamed "Diana Ross & the Supremes"). After Ruffin failed to show up for a series of engagements in Cleveland, Ohio that month (instead going to visit his then-girlfriend Gail Martin, daughter of Dean Martin, and see her open her own musical show), Otis Williams and the other Temptations decided Ruffin had gone too far and fired him.

Dennis Edwards was brought in as Ruffin's replacement, amidst cries of "Where's David?" from the crowds at live shows, and Ruffin's attempts to jump onstage and steal the microphone from Edwards during the shows. Edwards was officially introduced as the Temptations' new lead singer on July 9, 1968, at a live show in Valley Forge, Pennsylvania, and the group enlisted extra security to prevent Ruffin from attending and disrupting their shows,

Edwards would make his on-record debut with the next Temptations album, Diana Ross & the Supremes Join the Temptations. Starting with the group's next solo studio album, also titled Cloud Nine, producer Norman Whitfield began edging the group towards a Sly & the Family Stone-esque sound (dubbed "psychedelic soul"), using Edwards' gruffer voice as the centerpiece for several psychedelic-based hit singles and albums.

== Track listing ==
Side one
No.	Title	Writer(s)	Producer(s)	Length
1.	"I Could Never Love Another (After Loving You)" (lead: Ruffin)	Roger Penzabene, Barrett Strong, Norman Whitfield	Norman Whitfield	3:33
2.	"Cindy" (lead: Ruffin)	Smokey Robinson	Smokey Robinson	3:08
3.	"I Wish It Would Rain" (lead: Ruffin)	Penzabene, Strong, Whitfield	Norman Whitfield	2:48
4.	"Please Return Your Love to Me" (lead: Kendricks)	Strong, Whitfield, Barbara Neely	Norman Whitfield	2:26
5.	"Fan the Flame" (lead: Ruffin)	Al Cleveland, Terry Johnson, Robinson	Smokey Robinson	2:44
6.	"He Who Picks a Rose" (lead: Ruffin)	Edward Holland, Jr., Emilio "Father" Smiley, Whitfield	Norman Whitfield	2:28

Side two
No.	Title	Writer(s)	Producer(s)	Length
1.	"Why Did You Leave Me Darling" (lead: Ruffin)	James Dean, Deke Richards	Dennis Lussier	2:11
2.	"I Truly, Truly Believe" (lead: Franklin)	George Gordy, Margaret Gordy, Allen Story	Henry Cosby	2:44
3.	"This is My Beloved" (lead: Kendricks)	Nickolas Ashford, Valerie Simpson	Harvey Fuqua, Johnny Bristol	2:13
4.	"Gonna Give Her All the Love I've Got" (lead: P. Williams)	Strong, Whitfield	Norman Whitfield	2:46
5.	"I've Passed This Way Before" (lead: Ruffin, Franklin)	Dean, William Weatherspoon	James Dean, William Weatherspoon	2:43
6.	"No Man Can Love Her Like I Do" (lead: P. Williams)	Holland, Whitfield, Eddie Kendricks	Norman Whitfield	2:16

=== Unreleased track ===
- "I Know She's Not a Mannequin" (Johnny Bristol, Shena Dermell, Harvey Fuqua) – lead vocal by David Ruffin – produced by Johnny Bristol. Subsequently, released on Lost and Found: You've Got to Earn It (1962–1968).

== Personnel ==
The Temptations

- David Ruffin - vocals (tenor/falsetto/baritone)
- Eddie Kendricks - vocals (first tenor/falsetto)
- Paul Williams - vocals (second tenor/baritone)
- Melvin Franklin - vocals (bass)
- Otis Williams - vocals (second tenor/baritone)

with:

- The Funk Brothers - instrumentation
