= Mumford High School =

High school in Detroit, Wayne County, Michigan

Coordinates: 42.4215°N 83.1646°W

Location
- 17525 Wyoming Avenue; Detroit, Michigan 48221-2414; United States

Information
- School type: Public
- Established: 1952
- School district: Detroit Public Schools Community District
- Principal: Nolan Procter
- Teaching staff: 41.80 (FTE)
- Grades: 9–12
- Enrollment: 852 (2023–2024)
- Student to teacher ratio: 20.38
- Language: English
- Area: Urban
- Colors: Powder blue and burgundy
- Mascot: Mustangs
- Website: https://mumford.detroitk12.org/

Student assessments
- 2021–22 school year Change vs. prior year

M-STEP 11th grade proficiency rates (Science / Social Studies)
- Advanced %: ≤5 / ≤5
- Proficient %: – / –
- PR. Proficient %: 8.0 / 44.5
- Not Proficient %: 87.0 / 49.2

Average test scores
- SAT Total: 762.5 (▼ −54.8)

Samuel C. Mumford High School is a public high school located on the near-northwest side of Detroit, Michigan. It was operated by the Detroit Public Schools Community District, and had been operated by the Education Achievement Authority of Michigan (EAA). DPS re-assumed control of Mumford High in fall 2017.

== History ==
Following war-delayed construction, Mumford High opened in September 1952; a time when large segments of Detroit's Jewish-American population had already begun an inexorable movement toward the suburban communities of Oakland County. Mumford's architectural profile featured imported powder blue limestone block and exquisite Art Deco styling similar to other Detroit high schools. During much of the 1950s and early 1960s, Mumford High served a predominantly Jewish student population.

The original building was demolished during the summer of 2012. A new building was constructed at the same Wyoming Avenue address and opened in August, 2012.

It was named after Detroit School Board member and Detroit Edison treasurer Samuel C. Mumford.

When it was operated by Detroit Public Schools (DPS), communities within Mumford's attendance zone included Palmer Park, Palmer Woods and Sherwood Forest.

In 2015 the United States Department of Justice charged former EAA-era principal Kenyetta "K.C." Wilbourn-Snapp with bribery and conspiracy charges. Wilbourn, who had been principal of Mumford and Denby High School, agreed to plead guilty as part of a plea bargain. She pleaded guilty to tax evasion and accepting a $58,000 bribe.

== Athletics ==
1959 graduate, Barry Shapiro set a city record on his way to winning the 100-yard breaststroke, at the 1959 Detroit Public School League (DPSSAL) swimming finals. In fact, Shapiro's time was superior to the existing Michigan High School Athletic Association record for the event. Barry was among the fastest breaststrokers in the state, during a period (1931–1961) when Detroit schools did not participate in MHSAA championship events; he never had the chance to swim for a state title.

Another Mumford athlete, Richard Golden made the best of his opportunity to compete at the state level. During the 1963 MHSAA finals, Richard finished third in the 50-yard freestyle; to this day, Golden is Mumford's only All-State swimmer.

In 1966, in his first year as Mumford's basketball coach, Sam Taub led Mumford to the east side championship in the Detroit Public School league before losing to Northwestern by 3 points in the city championship game. Mumford went on to win district and regional championships in the state tournament before losing to East Detroit in the state quarterfinals. All-State center Larry Moore averaged 27 points a game to lead the Mustangs.

In 1969, Coach Taub guided the Mustangs to the PSL title; Mumford defeated Northern High 72–55 to claim the trophy. The Mustangs advanced to the state semifinals before losing to Ypsilanti. Taub was also the school's golf coach and a collegiate basketball referee.

MMumford's track and field program has won a total of six Michigan High School Athletic Association championships since 1999. The Lady Mustangs won state titles in 2004 and 2005; while Mumford's men brought home the MHSAA crown in 1999, 2002, 03 and 04.

In 2005, Mumford won its first DPSSAL football title; the Mustangs defeated Finney High, 26–13 to claim the championship trophy.

== Notable alumni ==
- John "Tiny" Andrews, class of 1969, former defensive tackle for NFL's Miami Dolphins
- Ivan Boesky, a 1955 graduate, came to Mumford after having attended Cranbrook School in Bloomfield Hills; was convicted for role in Wall Street insider trading scandal during mid-1980s; his involvement is recounted in book Den of Thieves by Pulitzer Prize-winning author James B. Stewart
- Paul Borman, federal judge on United States District Court for the Eastern District of Michigan since 1994, was earlier an Assistant U.S. Attorney, Special Counsel to the Mayor of Detroit, and Chief Federal Defender of the Legal Aid & Defender Association of Detroit from 1979 to 1994; also professor at Wayne State University Law School and adjunct lecturer at University of Michigan.
- Jerry Bruckheimer, film and television producer whose credits include three CSI television series, Pirates of the Caribbean film series, and Flashdance; produced Beverly Hills Cop, in which Eddie Murphy's character Axel Foley is seen wearing a "Mumford Phys Ed Dept" T-shirt
- Kenneth Ferguson, world-class track and field athlete; ranked 7th globally in 400-meter hurdles (2007) During his time at Mumford, Ferguson was a six-time Michigan High School Athletic Association champion in the hurdles and relay events
- R. Barri Flowers (1974), criminologist, author, inducted into Michigan State University Criminal Justice Wall of Fame in 2006
- Cornelius Grant, noteworthy guitarist with Motown Records
- Judith Guest (great-niece of Edgar Guest); attended Mumford for one year (1951); her first book, Ordinary People, published in 1976, was adapted as a 1980 film that won an Academy Award for Best Picture
- Aaron Hayden, former NFL running back
- Jemele Hill (1993), ESPN sportscaster and columnist
- Earl Klugh, jazz musician and Grammy Award-winning recording artist
- Ruth Laredo (née Meckler), concert pianist
- Derrick Mason, played football for Michigan State University and NFL's Houston Oilers and Tennessee Titans, earning All-Pro recognition
- Roger Penzabene, songwriter for Motown label; notable compositions include "The End of Our Road" by Gladys Knight & the Pips and Marvin Gaye, and a trilogy of hits for the Temptations: "You're My Everything", "I Wish It Would Rain", and "I Could Never Love Another (After Loving You)"
- Gilda Radner, actress and original Saturday Night Live cast member, wife of actor Gene Wilder; attended Mumford for one year
- David Ramsey, actor in Con Air (1997), Ali: An American Hero (2000), Arrow (2012-2020).
- Stephen M. Ross, CEO and chairman of National Football League's Miami Dolphins
- Bruce Joel Rubin, screenwriter whose film credits include Deep Impact, Sleeping with the Enemy (1991)and Ghost (1990)
- Robert Shaye, movie producer, director, co-founder of New Line Cinema, notable for distributing The Lord of the Rings film trilogy
- Marcus Thigpen, CFL player for Saskatchewan Roughriders and NFL player for Miami Dolphins
- Allee Willis, Grammy Award-winning songwriter and multi-media artist, whose hits include "September" and "Boogie Wonderland" by Earth, Wind & Fire; "Neutron Dance" by The Pointer Sisters; theme song to TV series Friends and Broadway musical The Color Purple
- The Winans, The Clark Sisters, Fred Hammond and Deitrick Haddon, Gospel singers
