= Four Brothers (film) =

2005 film directed by John Singleton

- Theatrical release poster
- Directed by: John Singleton
- Written by: David Elliot; Paul Lovett
- Produced by: Lorenzo di Bonaventura
- Starring: Mark Wahlberg; Tyrese Gibson; André Benjamin; Garrett Hedlund; Terrence Howard; Fionnula Flanagan; Josh Charles; Chiwetel Ejiofor
- Cinematography: Peter Menzies Jr.
- Edited by: Billy Fox; Bruce Cannon
- Music by: David Arnold
- Production company: Di Bonaventura Pictures
- Distributed by: Paramount Pictures
- Release date: August 12, 2005
- Running time: 109 minutes
- Country: United States
- Language: English
- Budget: $30 million
- Box office: $92.5 million

Four Brothers is a 2005 American action film directed by John Singleton and written by David Elliot and Paul Lovett. The film stars Mark Wahlberg, Tyrese Gibson, André Benjamin and Garrett Hedlund as four adopted brothers who set out to avenge the murder of their adoptive mother. Terrence Howard, Fionnula Flanagan, Josh Charles and Chiwetel Ejiofor also star. The film was shot in Detroit, Michigan; the Greater Toronto Area; and Hamilton, Ontario. It has been described as blaxploitation-influenced. Released on August 12, 2005, the film received mixed reviews from critics and grossed $92 million worldwide.

== Plot ==
An older woman, Evelyn Mercer, is murdered at a convenience store in Highland Park, Michigan when a robbery occurs that results in the death of the store clerk and her, the sole witness. The incident brings her four adopted sons back home to Detroit, Michigan to find out what happened. The oldest is a lifelong criminal, hot-tempered Bobby; the second oldest is family man and union construction worker Jeremiah; the third oldest is an ex-hustler and former US Marine, Angel; and the youngest is aspiring rock musician Jack.

During their investigation of the crime of what seems to be a simple robbery gone wrong, they discover that it was a cover for a hit put out on Evelyn after interrogating the witness who turned out to be involved.

The brothers track down the pair of hired guns who shot and killed Evelyn, and when they refuse to give up any information, they are executed by the enraged Bobby and Angel. The next day, the brothers' friend-turned-Detroit Police Lieutenant Green and his partner Detective Fowler confront the brothers about the murders. While the brothers deny involvement, Lieutenant Green warns them that their interference with Evelyn's case is ill-advised and that it would put them in over their heads.

Confronting Jeremiah upon the discovery of his business failing and benefiting from Evelyn's life insurance, he informs his brothers that his construction company was failing precisely because he was not getting involved with gang lord Victor Sweet. For a project to succeed he had to pay off the right people, which he initially failed to do.

Trying to restore his business and relieve pressure on himself, Jeremiah pays off Sweet's henchmen. As for the life insurance, he explains that the money went directly to him for his daughters, because he paid all of Evelyn's bills while the others were not around. Sweet's men attack the brothers; Jack is shot during the subsequent gunfight and dies shortly after. Bobby and Angel fend off and kill the gunmen.

Lieutenant Green informs them that Evelyn filed a police report regarding Victor Sweet and his involvement in Jeremiah's affairs, which Fowler passed on to Sweet. He warns them to stay out of the matter and let him handle Fowler, and then promises to work together on Sweet. Green confronts Fowler about Evelyn as he's realized he's a crooked cop. After they walk out of the bar, knowing Green will arrest him, Fowler kills him and makes dispatch believe two black assailants had fired upon them.

The remaining brothers devise a plan to buy Victor Sweet off with the $400,000 from their mother's life insurance. Arriving at Fowler's, Angel subdues him. Jeremiah goes to meet Sweet while Angel's girlfriend, Sofi, heads to the police station, where she tells them that Angel is planning to kill a police officer.

Hearing the sirens in the distance, Fowler believes they are coming for Angel, until Angel opens his jacket revealing a wire. He claims the whole conversation was taped, including Fowler's admission that he killed Green.

The police arrive at Fowler's in full force, at which point Fowler gets the upper hand on Angel. With his gun pointed at Angel's head he tells the officers outside to back off, and is killed in the ensuing firefight.

Meanwhile, at frozen-over Lake St. Clair, Jeremiah meets with Sweet, who reveals he intends to kill him. Jeremiah also reveals that the $400,000 was paid off to Sweet's henchmen, who were embittered due to Sweet's mistreatment. Sweet angrily demands to know who will be brave enough to kill him, just as Bobby shows up. The two brawl, during which Bobby uses his hockey skills to get the upper hand, knocking Sweet unconscious. His former henchmen seal his fate, dropping him into a hole carved in the ice.

The three brothers, taken into police custody, are beaten by corrupt cops, in an attempt to make them confess to the murder of Sweet but give up nothing, and are eventually released. Back home, they set about repairing their mother's house and continuing their lives together.

== Cast ==
- Mark Wahlberg as Bobby Mercer, the oldest of the Mercers and lifelong criminal, hot-tempered, former hockey league player.
- Tyrese Gibson as Angel Mercer, the third oldest of the Mercers, retired Marine and hustler.
- André Benjamin as Jeremiah “Jerry” Mercer, the second oldest of the Mercers, family man and construction worker.
- Garrett Hedlund as Jack Mercer, the youngest of the four, and aspiring rock musician.
- Terrence Howard as Lieutenant Green, Bobby, Jeremiah, Angel & Jack's old friend turned Police Lieutenant who investigates the murder opposite the brothers.
- Josh Charles as Detective Fowler, Green's partner who is revealed to be corrupt.
- Sofía Vergara as Sofi, Angel's girlfriend.
- Fionnula Flanagan as Evelyn Mercer, the adoptive mother of Bobby, Jeremiah, Angel & Jack.
- Chiwetel Ejiofor as Victor Sweet, a local gangster who filed a hit on Evelyn.
- Taraji P. Henson as Camille Mercer, Jeremiah's wife.
- Barry Shabaka Henley as Councilman Douglas, a city councilman who closes Jeremiah's construction company on orders of Sweet.
- Tony Nappo as Charlie, an Italian-American gangster
- Jernard Burks as Evan, one of Charlie's top goons.
- Kenneth Welsh as Robert Bradford, Evelyn's lawyer.
- Reiya West Downs as Daniela Mercer, Jeremiah & Camille's first daughter.
- Riele West Downs as Amelia Mercer, Jeremiah & Camille's second daughter.
- Kevin Duhaney as Keenon, a kid whom Bobby, Jeremiah, Angel & Jack interrogate.
- Lyriq Bent as Damian, Keenon's older brother who is in cahoots with Sweet.
- Adam Beach as Chief

== Music ==
The music for the film includes, in a repeating refrain, the song "I Wish It Would Rain", written by Norman J. Whitfield, Barrett Strong and Rodger L. Penzabene Sr., and performed by The Temptations, courtesy of Motown Records.

=== Soundtrack ===
Four Brothers - Music from the Original Motion Picture

Soundtrack album by Various Artists
- Released: August 28, 2005 (U.S.)
- Recorded: 1966–1975
- Genres: Pop, rock, funk, soul, jazz
- Length: 52:03
- Label: Motown Records
- Producers: John Singleton (exec.); Lorenzo di Bonaventura (exec.)

Track listing
No.	Title	Writer(s)	Artist(s)	Length
1.	"Dancing Machine"	Hal Davis; Weldon Dean Parks; Donald E. Fletcher	The Jackson Five	2:41
2.	"'T' Plays It Cool"	Marvin Gaye	Marvin Gaye	4:23
3.	"Shake Me, Wake Me (When It's Over)"	Edward James Holland, Jr.; Lamont H. Dozier; Brian Holland	The Four Tops	2:41
4.	"Papa Was a Rollin' Stone"	Norman J. Whitfield; Barrett Strong	The Temptations	6:59
5.	"Inner City Blues (Make Me Wanna Holler)"	Marvin Gaye; James Nyx Jr.	Marvin Gaye	5:29
6.	"I Wish It Would Rain"	Norman J. Whitfield; Barrett Strong; Rodger L. Penzabene, Sr.	The Temptations	2:48
7.	"Smiling Faces Sometimes"	Norman J. Whitfield; Barrett Strong	The Undisputed Truth	3:18
8.	"Cloud Nine"	Norman J. Whitfield; Barrett Strong	The Temptations	3:34
9.	"Cleo's Apartment"	Marvin Gaye	Marvin Gaye	2:13
10.	"Take A Look Around"	Norman J. Whitfield; Barrett Strong	The Temptations	3:12
11.	"Knucklehead"	Grover Washington Jr.	Grover Washington, Jr.	7:52
12.	"Do It Baby"	Marvin Gaye	The Miracles	3:05
13.	"Trouble Man"	Marvin Gaye	Marvin Gaye	3:49

Songs from the film but not included on the soundtrack includes:

- "Somebody to Love" by Jefferson Airplane
- "What U Gon' Do" by Lil Jon and The East Side Boyz (feat. Lil Scrappy)
- "Shallow" by Porcupine Tree
- "Get Back" by Subway to Venus
- "Oh Boy" by Eastside Chedda Boyz
- "Plastic Jesus" by Ed Rush and George Cromarty
- "Ride Out" by Blade Icewood
- "Got That Fire" by Mycale
- "Dum Da Dum" by 2Xl
- "Jesus Walks" by Kanye West (containing a sample of "Walk with Me" performed by The Arc Choir)
- “Pop Out (Freestyle)” by Kid Mesc, newly known as Kid Cudi, recorded for his demos.
- "In the Thick" by The Co-Stars
- "Motown Flava" by Spooky and The Chunk
- "After Dark" by The Co-Stars
- "World's Gonna End" by Josh Rifkin, Ben Levine, Chris Steele, and Dave Hemann
- "Brother's Gonna Work It Out" by Willie Hutch
- "Für Elise" (uncredited), written by Ludwig van Beethoven

== Release ==
Four Brothers was released in the United States on August 12, 2005. Big B, a Malayalam Movie, is an unofficial remake of this movie.

== Reception ==
=== Box office ===
Four Brothers grossed $74.5 million in the United States and Canada, and $18 million in other territories, for a worldwide total of $92.5 million, against a budget of $30 million.

It made $21.2 million on its first weekend, topping the box office.

=== Critical response ===
On the review aggregator Rotten Tomatoes, the film holds an approval rating of 53% based on 132 reviews, with an average rating of 5.7/10. The site's critics consensus reads: "Despite striking a believable rapport among its principal actors, Four Brothers overwhelms with ultra-violent, vigilante-glorifying action and devolves into too many fractured, insubstantial thematic directions." At Metacritic the film has a weighted average score of 49 out of 100, based on 31 critics, indicating "mixed or average" reviews. Audiences polled by CinemaScore gave the film an average grade of "B+" on an A+ to F scale.

== Sequel ==
An article written in 2010 suggested that Paramount Pictures was developing a sequel for the film, with Mark Wahlberg returning to reprise his role while David Elliot and Paul Lovett would return to write the script.

In a 2020 post on his Instagram page, Tyrese Gibson said a script for a sequel, Five Brothers, is in the works.

== See also ==
- The Sons of Katie Elder: A 1965 American Western film with a similar premise.
- Big B: A Malayalam language film directed by Amal Neerad that was an unofficial remake of this film.
