= Squillante =

Squillante is a surname. Notable people with the surname include:

- James Squillante (1919–1960), American New York mobster
- Mauro Squillante, Italian plucked-instruments researcher and mandolinist
- Maurizio Squillante, Italian composer
- Rick Squillante (1948–2001), nightclub disc jockey and music industry representative and record producer
