= (Loneliness Made Me Realize) It's You That I Need =

1967 single by The Temptations

- Norwegian release picture sleeve

Single by The Temptations

from the album The Temptations with a Lot o' Soul
- B-side: "Don't Send Me Away"
- Released: September 26, 1967
- Recorded: Hitsville USA (Studio A); 1967
- Genre: Soul
- Length: 2:36
- Label: Gordy; G 7065
- Songwriters: Norman Whitfield; Edward Holland, Jr.
- Producer: Norman Whitfield

The Temptations singles chronology
"You're My Everything" / "I've Been Good to You" (1967)	"(Loneliness Made Me Realize) It's You That I Need" (1967)	"I Wish It Would Rain" (1967)

The Temptations with a Lot O' Soul track listing
- 1. "(I Know) I'm Losing You"; 2. "Ain't No Sun Since You've Been Gone"; 3. "All I Need"; 4. "(Loneliness Made Me Realize) It's You That I Need"; 5. "No More Water in the Well"; 6. "Save My Love For a Rainy Day"; 7. "Just One Last Look"; 8. "Sorry Is a Sorry Word"; 9. "You're My Everything"; 10. "Now That You've Won Me"; 11. "Two Sides to Love"; 12. "Don't Send Me Away"

"(Loneliness Made Me Realize) It's You That I Need" is a 1963 song that became a 1967 hit single recorded by the Temptations for the Gordy (Motown) label, produced and co-written by Norman Whitfield. Billboard described the single as a "groovy rocker" that "is loaded with excitement and another top vocal workout."

== Background ==
As the song's narrator, Temptations lead singer David Ruffin tells his former love that since they broke up he can only think of her and no one else, and since he can't find someone else to love he has an unbearable loneliness in his heart. This is one of the rare pre-1968 singles to feature the group members singing all lead vocals at one point, as the other members, Eddie Kendricks, Melvin Franklin, Paul Williams, and Otis Williams, each have a solo spot out front on the last verse. Issued with the Otis Williams-led "Don't Send Me Away" as its B-side, "It's You That I Need" was the fourth and final single from the group's 1967 album The Temptations with a Lot o' Soul. The single would be the last one with all group members singing lead until "Cloud Nine". It would also be the last single in which lyricist Eddie Holland would be teamed with Norman Whitfield, who would now be partnered with Barrett Strong for the next five years creating the group's material. Holland, who originally recorded the song (for the Motown label) as an unreleased track back in 1963, was also a member of the production team of H-D-H, who had become dissatisfied with both their pay and the working atmosphere at Motown, and the trio left the label in early 1968.

== Personnel ==
- Lead and background vocals by David Ruffin (whole song), Paul Williams, Eddie Kendricks, Melvin Franklin, and Otis Williams (last verse)
- Instrumentation by The Funk Brothers

== Chart performance ==
"(Loneliness Made Me Realize) It's You That I Need" is one of the small handful of pre-psychedelic era songs the group recorded that had more than two members singing lead at one point, and the only one that charted. It peaked on the Billboard Hot 100 singles chart at number 14 and the Billboard R&B chart at number 3.

Chart (1967)	Peak position
U.S. Billboard Hot 100	14
U.S. Billboard Hot R&B Singles	3

== Cover versions ==
- Ruffin's brother, Jimmy Ruffin, had previously covered this song in 1965, though his version would not be released until 2014.
