= The Temptations with a Lot o' Soul =

Studio album by The Temptations
- Released: July 17, 1967
- Recorded: March 1966 – February 1967
- Studio: Hitsville USA, Detroit
- Genre: Soul
- Length: 34:52
- Label: Gordy; GS 922
- Producer: Norman Whitfield; Smokey Robinson; Brian Holland; Lamont Dozier; Frank Wilson; Ivy Jo Hunter

The Temptations chronology
Temptations Live! (1967)	The Temptations with a Lot o' Soul (1967)	The Temptations in a Mellow Mood (1967)

Singles from The Temptations with a Lot o' Soul
- 1. "(I Know) I'm Losing You" Released: November 2, 1966; 2. "All I Need" Released: April 13, 1967; 3. "You're My Everything" Released: June 13, 1967; 4. "(Loneliness Made Me Realize) It's You That I Need" Released: September 26, 1967

Professional ratings
Review scores
Source	Rating
AllMusic	4.5/5 stars
Rolling Stone	(Unfavorable)

The Temptations with a Lot o' Soul is the fifth studio album by The Temptations for the Gordy (Motown) label released in 1967. Featuring four hit singles, With a Lot o' Soul is the most successful Temptations album from their "classic 5" era, during which David Ruffin, Eddie Kendricks, Paul Williams, Melvin Franklin, and Otis Williams constituted the Temptations' lineup.

== Track listing ==
All lead vocals by David Ruffin except where noted

=== Side one ===
1. "(I Know) I'm Losing You" (Cornelius Grant, Edward Holland, Jr., Norman Whitfield) 2:26
2. "Ain't No Sun Since You've Been Gone" (Grant, Sylvia Moy, Whitfield) 2:59
3. "All I Need" (Frank Wilson, E. Holland, R. Dean Taylor) 3:07
4. "(Loneliness Made Me Realize) It's You That I Need" (E. Holland, Whitfield) (lead singer: David Ruffin; last verse vocals: Eddie Kendricks, Paul Williams, Melvin Franklin, Otis Williams) 2:35
5. "No More Water in the Well" (Warren Moore, Smokey Robinson, Bobby Rogers) (lead singer: Paul Williams; adlibs: David Ruffin, Eddie Kendricks, Otis Williams) 2:59
6. "Save My Love for a Rainy Day" (Roger Penzabene, Whitfield) (lead singer: Eddie Kendricks) 2:56

=== Side two ===
1. "Just One Last Look" (Holland–Dozier–Holland) 2:43
2. "Sorry is a Sorry Word" (E. Holland, Ivy Jo Hunter) 2:27
3. "You're My Everything" (Grant, Penzabene, Whitfield) (lead singer: Eddie Kendricks; bridge vocals: David Ruffin) 2:57
4. "Now That You've Won Me" (Robinson) 3:09
5. "Two Sides to Love" (Moy, Whitfield) (lead singer: Eddie Kendricks) 2:46
6. "Don't Send Me Away" (Eddie Kendricks, Robinson) (lead singers: Otis Williams, Melvin Franklin) 2:56

== Known outtakes ==
The following outtakes were included on the Temptations box set Emperors of Soul in 1994.

- "I Got Heaven Right Here on Earth" (Kendricks, E. Holland, Whitfield)
  - Produced by Norman Whitfield, led by David Ruffin
- "I'm Doing It All" (Robinson, Grant)
  - Produced by Smokey Robinson, led by Eddie Kendricks
- "Angel Doll" (Stevie Wonder, Clarence Paul, Morris Broadnax)
  - Produced by Clarence Paul, led by David Ruffin

The following outtakes were included on the Temptations CD set Lost and Found: You've Got to Earn It (1962–1968) in 1999.

- "What Am I Gonna Do Without You" (Hunter, Wonder)
  - Produced by Ivy Jo Hunter, led by David Ruffin
- "Love Is What You Make It" (Robinson)
  - Produced by Smokey Robinson, led by David Ruffin
- "No Time" (Robinson, Moore)
  - Produced by Smokey Robinson, led by Eddie Kendricks
- "Last One Out Is Brokenhearted" (William "Mickey" Stevenson, Hunter)
  - Produced by Ivy Jo Hunter, led by Paul Williams
- " I Can't Think of a Thing At All" (Robinson)
  - Produced by Smokey Robinson, led by Paul Williams
- "Forever in My Heart" (Robinson, Rogers)
  - Produced by Smokey Robinson, led by Paul Williams
- "I Now See You Clear Through My Eyes" (Robinson)
  - Produced by Smokey Robinson, led by Paul Williams
- "Camouflage" [Version 2] (Berry Gordy, Jr.)
  - Produced by Berry Gordy, Jr., led by Eddie Kendricks & David Ruffin
- "We'll Be Satisfied" (F. Wilson, Marc Gordon)
  - Produced by Frank Wilson, led by David Ruffin, Paul Williams & Eddie Kendricks
- "Only A Lonely Man Would Know" (Hunter, Beatrice Verdi)
  - Produced by Ivy Jo Hunter, led by David Ruffin

== Personnel ==
The Temptations

- David Ruffin – vocals (tenor/baritone)
- Eddie Kendricks – vocals (tenor/falsetto)
- Paul Williams – vocals (baritone)
- Melvin Franklin – vocals (bass)
- Otis Williams – vocals (second tenor)

with:

- The Andantes – additional backing vocals on "All I Need"
- Cornelius Grant – guitar on "(I Know) I'm Losing You", "All I Need" and "You're My Everything"
- The Funk Brothers – instrumentation:
  - Earl Van Dyke – keyboards on "(I Know) I'm Losing You", "All I Need" and "Sorry is a Sorry Word"
  - James Jamerson – bass on "(I Know) I'm Losing You", "All I Need" and "Sorry is a Sorry Word"
  - Uriel Jones – drums on "(I Know) I'm Losing You" and "All I Need"
  - Benny Benjamin – drums on "Sorry is a Sorry Word"
  - Eddie "Bongo" Brown – percussion on "(I Know) I'm Losing You"
  - Bobbye Hall – percussion on "Sorry is a Sorry Word"
  - Jack Ashford – tambourine on "(I Know) I'm Losing You" and "Sorry is a Sorry Word", percussion on "All I Need"
  - Robert White – guitar on "Sorry is a Sorry Word"
  - Joe Messina – guitar on "Sorry is a Sorry Word"
  - Eddie Willis – guitar on "Sorry is a Sorry Word"

Production

- Norman Whitfield – "(I Know) I'm Losing You", "Ain't No Sun Since You've Been Gone", "(Loneliness Made Me Realize) It's You That I Need", "Save My Love for a Rainy Day", "You're My Everything" and "Two Sides to Love", Executive Producer
- Smokey Robinson – "No More Water in the Well", "Now That You've Won Me" and "Don't Send Me Away"
- Frank Wilson – "All I Need"
- Brian Holland and Lamont Dozier – "Just One Last Look"
- Ivy Jo Hunter – "Sorry is a Sorry Word"

== Charts ==
=== Weekly charts ===
Chart (1967)	Peak position
UK Albums (OCC)	19
US Billboard 200	7

=== Singles ===
"(I Know) I'm Losing You"	U.S. Billboard Pop Singles	8
"(I Know) I'm Losing You"	U.S. Billboard R&B Singles	1
"(I Know) I'm Losing You"	U.K. Singles Chart	19
"All I Need"	U.S. Billboard Pop Singles	8
"All I Need"	U.S. Billboard R&B Singles	2
"You're My Everything"	U.S. Billboard Pop Singles	6
"You're My Everything"	U.S. Billboard R&B Singles	3
"You're My Everything"	U.K. Singles Chart	26
"(Loneliness Made Me Realize) It's You That I Need"	U.S. Billboard Pop Singles	14
"(Loneliness Made Me Realize) It's You That I Need"	U.S. Billboard R&B Singles	3

== See also ==
- List of number-one R&B albums of 1967 (U.S.)
