= Uptown Girl (disambiguation) =

"Uptown Girl" is a 1983 song by Billy Joel.

Uptown Girl(s) may also refer to:

- Uptown Girl (EP), by Mirani, 2021
- "Uptown Girl", a 1981 song by Leif Garrett
- "Uptown Girl", a season 8 episode of Degrassi: The Next Generation
- Uptown Girls, a 2003 American film
- Uptown Girls (group), an American music group active during the 1980s

== See also ==
- Updown Girl
