= Florence Rawlings =

British singer

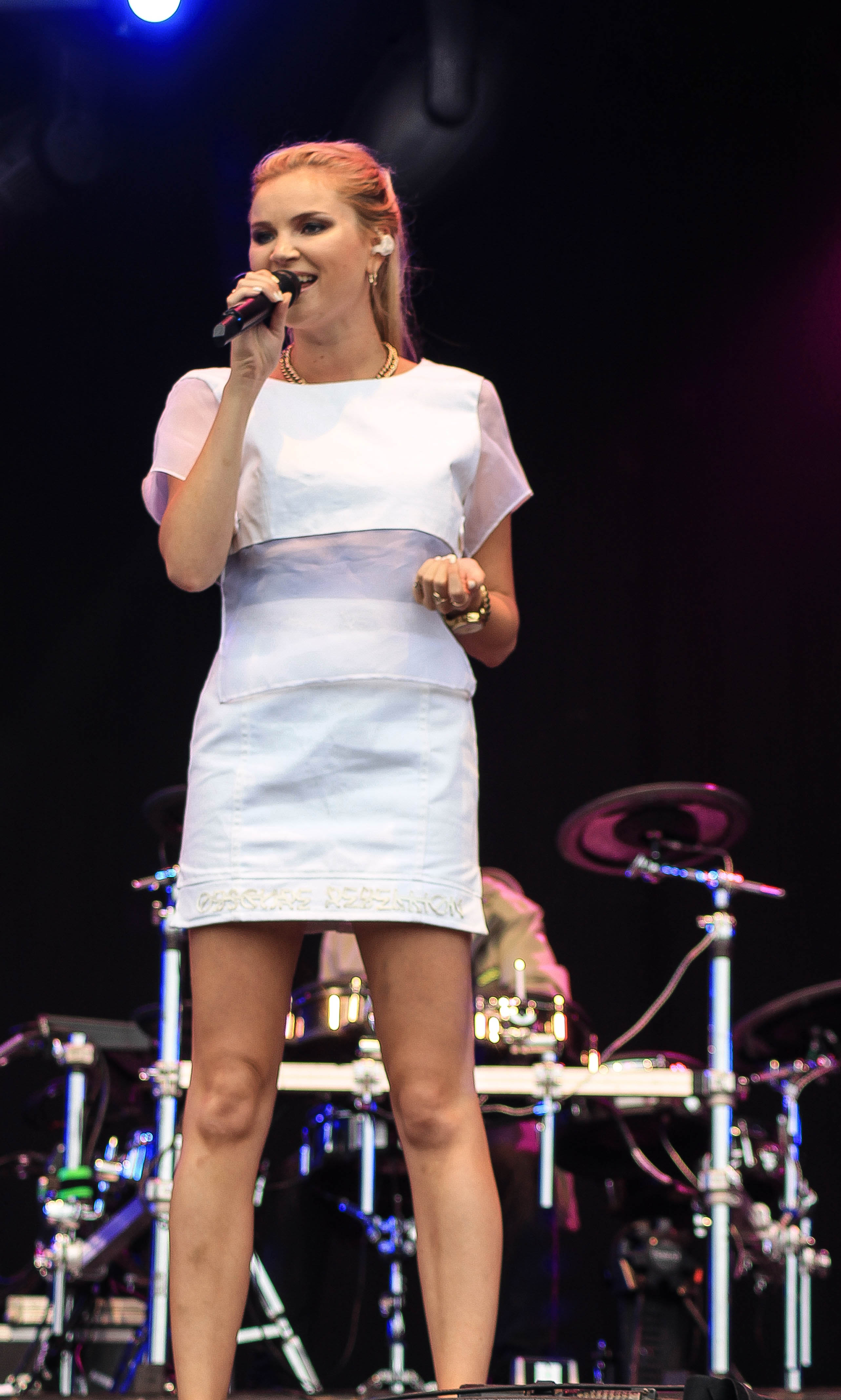
- Rawlings in 2014

Background information
- Born: 26 September 1988 (age 37); South London, England
- Genres: Pop; electropop; dance-pop
- Occupations: Singer; songwriter
- Instrument: vocals
- Years active: 2007–present
- Spouse: Marc Edwards

Florence Rawlings (born 26 September 1988) is an English singer-songwriter who is formerly touring member for the band Clean Bandit from 2013 to 2016.

== Early career ==
Rawlings first met Dramatico Entertainment chairman Mike Batt when she was 13 years old. He was auditioning female vocalists, and two of them stood out to him: one was Florence and the other was Katie Melua. Batt signed Melua, but as Florence was so young, it was agreed that she should finish her studies before embarking on her professional career. On completing her A-level exams, Florence signed to Batt's Dramatico label.

== Performances ==
Rawlings made a special appearance in 2008 with Mike Batt at the Stuttgart Jazz Open. She returned to the event the following year for a performance at the Bix Club and made a guest appearance at the concert given by Katie Melua with Mike Batt conducting the Stuttgart Philharmonic

In the UK, Rawlings was booked to perform at several festivals in 2009 including The Isle of Wight Festival (her performance opened the festival), Wireless Festival, and Guilfest. She performed as support for Booker T at Bush Hall in Shepherd's Bush, London.

Rawlings toured the UK and Europe in Autumn/Winter 2009 as support act for Tom Jones on his "24 Hours" European Tour.

She performed her first headlining show at Bush Hall in Shepherd's Bush, London on 24 February 2010.

She appeared as a support singer, not credited, in Clean Bandit's cover of Royals from Lorde, in January 2014. She again met up with the group to perform 'Extraordinary' as a lead singer at the Capital Summertime Ball in June 2014, and again to perform as a lead singer with the group for their entire set at Reading and Leeds Festivals in August 2014. She toured with the band from 2013 to 2016.

== Discography ==
Album: A Fool In Love Dramatico, 2009

- "I Wouldn't Treat a Dog (The Way You Treated Me)" (Walsh/Barri/Price/Omartian)
- "The Only Woman in the World" (Mike Batt)
- "Riverboat" (Allen Toussaint)
- "Jump on the Wagon" (Mike Batt)
- "Wolf Man" (Mike Batt)
- "A Fool in Love" (Ike Turner)
- "Hard To Get" (Mike Batt)
- "Can't Hold Your Hand" (Mike Batt)
- "Take Me in Your Arms and Love Me" (Strong/Penzabene/Grant)
- "Can't Catch Me" (Chuck Berry)
- "A Dollar of My Pain" (Mike Batt)
- "Love Can Be a Battlefield" (Mike Batt)
