= How Can I Forget (The Temptations song) =

1968 song by the Temptations

Single by The Temptations
- A-side: "Please Return Your Love to Me"
- Released: July 16, 1968
- Recorded: Hitsville USA; June 29, 1968
- Genre: Soul
- Length: 1:48
- Label: Gordy; G 7074
- Songwriters: Norman Whitfield; Barrett Strong
- Producer: Norman Whitfield

The Temptations singles chronology
"I Could Never Love Another (After Loving You)" (1968)	"Please Return Your Love to Me" / "How Can I Forget" (1968)	"Cloud Nine" (1968)

"How Can I Forget"

Single by Marvin Gaye

from the album That's the Way Love Is
- B-side: "Gonna Give Her All the Love I've Got"
- Released: December 16, 1969
- Recorded: Hitsville USA; 1969
- Genre: Soul, funk, psychedelic soul
- Length: 1:55
- Label: Tamla; T 54190
- Songwriters: Norman Whitfield; Barrett Strong
- Producer: Norman Whitfield

Marvin Gaye singles chronology
"What You Gave Me" (1969)	"How Can I Forget" (1969)	"The Onion Song" (1970)

"How Can I Forget" was originally recorded as a love ballad by Motown group The Temptations in 1968 and was re-recorded in a psychedelic soul/funk styling by fellow Motown artist, Marvin Gaye in 1969. His version, released on Motown's first subsidiary, Tamla, became a modest hit that almost reached the Top 40 of the pop charts while peaking at number 18 on the Hot Selling Soul Singles chart in 1970. Marvin's recording was featured on his That's the Way Love Is album. The song is also notable for being (at the time) one of the shortest recordings for both The Tempts and for Gaye; recorded when most songs are over three minutes, its length is just under two.

== Personnel ==
=== The Temptations' version ===
- Lead vocals by Paul Williams
- Background vocals by Eddie Kendricks, Melvin Franklin, and Otis Williams
- Instrumentation by The Funk Brothers

=== Marvin Gaye's version ===
- Lead vocals by Marvin Gaye
- Background vocals by The Originals: Freddie Gorman, Walter Gaines, Henry Dixon and C.P. Spencer
- Instrumentation by The Funk Brothers and the Detroit Symphony Orchestra
- Written by Norman Whitfield and Barrett Strong
- Produced by Norman Whitfield
