= All I Need (The Temptations song) =

1967 single by the Temptations

Single by the Temptations

from the album The Temptations with a Lot o' Soul
- B-side: "Sorry Is a Sorry Word"
- Released: April 13, 1967
- Recorded: Hitsville USA (Studio A); Hitsville USA (Studio B/Golden World); 1967
- Genre: Soul, pop
- Length: 3:19
- Label: Gordy; G 7061
- Songwriters: Frank Wilson; Eddie Holland; R. Dean Taylor
- Producer: Frank Wilson

The Temptations singles chronology
"(I Know) I'm Losing You" (1966)	"All I Need" / "Sorry Is a Sorry Word" (1967)	"You're My Everything" (1967)

The Temptations with a Lot o' Soul track listing
- 1. "(I Know) I'm Losing You"; 2. "Ain't No Sun Since You've Been Gone"; 3. "All I Need"; 4. "(Loneliness Made Me Realize) It's You That I Need"; 5. "No More Water in the Well"; 6. "Save My Love For a Rainy Day"; 7. "Just One Last Look"; 8. "Sorry Is a Sorry Word"; 9. "You're My Everything"; 10. "Now That You've Won Me"; 11. "Two Sides to Love"; 12. "Don't Send Me Away"

"All I Need" is a 1967 hit single recorded by the Temptations for the Gordy (Motown) label. It is the group's first single to be produced by Norman Whitfield's protégé Frank Wilson. Written by Wilson, Eddie Holland and R. Dean Taylor, the single was a Top 10 hit on the Billboard Hot 100, peaking at number 8; it was also a number-two hit on the Billboard R&B singles chart.

David Ruffin, the Temptations main lead singer, serves as the songs narrator. In it he's begging his lover to forgive his unfaithfulness and mistreatment of her, telling her how guilty he feels about it and that he'll make it up to her. The recording's beat is very similar to the songs written and produced by Holland-Dozier-Holland, Motown's main songwriting team (of which Holland was a part).

The single is the first not to be produced by the group's main producer Norman Whitfield since "Get Ready", and Whitfield produced all of their single releases starting with the following single. Due to Whitfield maintaining an iron grip on his creative control over The Temptations' released material, it would also be their last single not produced by Whitfield until their duets with Diana Ross and the Supremes in 1968.

Backed with the Ivy Jo Hunter production "Sorry is a Sorry Word" (co-written by Holland with Hunter), the single would be their second one from the group's 1967 album The Temptations with a Lot o' Soul. The Temptations performed the song live on the CBS variety show The Ed Sullivan Show on May 28, 1967, and the flip side was also performed, as part of a documentary, in 1967.

Cash Box called the single a "pulsing, driving, thumping, melodic reading" that is a "sure-to-please item."

Fellow Motown group Bobby Taylor & The Vancouvers recorded the song in 1968 but it remained unreleased until Bobby Taylor's Motown Anthology album came out in 2006. The Supremes recorded a slower version of the song (in 1971) with Jean Terrell on lead vocals. Their cover first appeared on the Motown Sings Motown Treasures album in 2005.

== Chart performance ==
=== Weekly charts ===
Chart (1967)	Peak position
UK	—
US Billboard Hot 100	8
US Billboard R&B	2
US Cash Box Top 100	8

=== Year-end charts ===
Chart (1967)	Rank
US (Joel Whitburn's Pop Annual)	84
US Cash Box Top 100	79

== Personnel ==
- Lead vocals by David Ruffin
- Background vocals by Eddie Kendricks, Melvin Franklin, Paul Williams, Otis Williams, and The Andantes (Louvain Demps, Marlene Barrow, Jackie Hicks)
- Guitar: Cornelius Grant
- Instrumentation by The Funk Brothers
