= Uptown & Uptown Girls =

Uptown
- Origin: New York NY
- Genres: Electronic dance music
- Years active: 1980's
- Labels: Silver Screen Records
- Website: https://uptownfeaturingalthearodgers.godaddysites.com/

Uptown & The Uptown Girls and The Uptown Girls (featuring Jan and Michelle) are 2 different groups. They were active in the 1980s in Dallas, Texas & NYC.

Both groups recorded an upbeat dance music cover of The Temptations' "(I Know) I'm Losing You" in 1983 which contained the original version of the song and an instrumental version by Uptown. Not The Uptown Girls. The track achieved popularity at Dallas' famed Starck nightclub due to play by DJ Rick Squillante and became a standard in many U.S. nightclubs, reaching the No. 80 spot on Billboard's Hot 100 in 1987. In 1989, it was re-recorded by The Uptown Girls with side A containing the Ultimix version and 89 Remix and Side B contained the Bonus Beats and Serious Sirens Mix.

In 1987, recording under the name of Uptown Girls feat. Jan & Michelle, a second single was released. I'm Gonna Love You was released as a 12-inch single which featured on Side A - I'm Gonna Love You (Club Mix 7:57) and I'm Gonna Love You (Radio Mix 3:46). Side B included I'm Gonna Love You (Latin Mix 7:42) and I'm Gonna Love You (Instrumental 7:53). The song was written and produced by Scott Yahney.

A third 12-inch single was released in 1989 which was a dance cover of Fontella Bass' 1965 hit "Rescue Me". Side A included the "Rescue Me Vocal" and "Rescue Me Radio Edit". Side B contained the "Rescue Me House Mix" and the "Rescue Me Instrumental".
