= Diana Ross & the Supremes Join the Temptations =

Studio album by Diana Ross & the Supremes and the Temptations
- Released: November 8, 1968
- Recorded: May 3 – September 13, 1968
- Genres: Pop; soul; R&B
- Length: 33:26
- Label: Motown
- Producers: Frank Wilson; Smokey Robinson; Al Cleveland; Henry Cosby; Terry "Buzzy" Johnson; Nickolas Ashford; Deke Richards

Diana Ross & the Supremes chronology
Diana Ross & the Supremes Sing and Perform "Funny Girl" (1968)	Diana Ross & the Supremes Join the Temptations (1968)	Love Child (1968)

Temptations chronology
The Temptations Wish It Would Rain (1968)	Diana Ross & the Supremes Join the Temptations (1968)	TCB (1968)

Professional ratings
Review scores
Source	Rating
AllMusic	4.5/5 stars
The Rolling Stone Album Guide	3/5 stars

Diana Ross & the Supremes Join the Temptations is a collaborative album combining Motown's two best selling groups, Diana Ross & the Supremes and the Temptations. Issued by Motown in late 1968 to coincide with the broadcast of the Supremes/Temptations TCB television special, the album was a success, reaching #2 on the Billboard 200. Diana Ross & the Supremes Join the Temptations spent four weeks at number one on the UK Albums Chart. This was the first album to feature Dennis Edwards as a member of The Temptations.

== Track listing ==
Diana Ross shares lead vocals on each track with one or more of the Temptations, identified by superscripts: (a) Eddie Kendricks, (b) Dennis Edwards, (c) Paul Williams, (d) Melvin Franklin, and/or (e) Otis Williams.

=== Side one ===
1. "Try It Baby" (Berry Gordy) ^{d, c} – 3:42
2. "I Second That Emotion" (Smokey Robinson, Al Cleveland) ^{a} – 2:19
3. "Ain't No Mountain High Enough" (Nickolas Ashford, Valerie Simpson) ^{b} – 2:16
4. "I'm Gonna Make You Love Me" (Kenneth Gamble, Leon Huff, Jerry Ross) ^{a, e} – 3:06
5. "This Guy's in Love With You" (Burt Bacharach, Hal David) ^{e} – 3:48
6. "Funky Broadway" (Arlester Christian) ^{b} – 2:32

=== Side two ===
1. "I'll Try Something New" (Robinson) ^{a} – 2:20
2. "A Place in the Sun" (Ron Miller, Bryan Wells) ^{c} – 3:29
3. "Sweet Inspiration" (Dan Penn, Spooner Oldham) ^{a} – 2:55
4. "Then" (Robinson, Bobby Rogers, Pete Moore) ^{c} – 2:12
5. "The Impossible Dream" (Joe Darion, Mitch Leigh) ^{c} – 4:47

== Known outtakes ==
All of the following songs were recorded for this album, but not included for the final track listing. These tracks can be found on Joined Together: The Complete Studio Duets, a 2004 Motown CD set combining this LP and its follow-up, Together.

1. Opening Medley (Holland–Dozier–Holland) ^{(on the intro: a, b, c, d, e)}
  1. "When the Lovelight Starts Shining Through His Eyes"
  2. "Come See About Me"
  3. "Stop! In the Name of Love"
  4. "Love Is Like an Itching in My Heart"
  5. "You Keep Me Hangin' On"
2. "Got to Get You into My Life" (John Lennon, Paul McCartney) *
3. "You Can't Hurry Love"/"You Keep Me Hangin' On" (Holland–Dozier–Holland)
4. "You Gave Me Something (and Everything's Alright)" (William Garrett, Albert Hamilton, Ronnie Savoy, Norma Toney) ^{c}
5. "A House Is Not a Home" (Bacharach, David) ^{a, c}*
6. "If You Should Walk Away" (Frank Wilson, Gordy)
7. "Amen" (Jester Hairston) ^{a, b, c}**

(*) Supremes member Mary Wilson shares a lead on this track. (**) Mary Wilson and Cindy Birdsong also have leads on this track.

== Personnel ==
- Frank Wilson, producer (H. B. Barnum, arranger) - "Try It Baby" and "The Impossible Dream"
- Frank Wilson and Nickolas Ashford, producers (Paul Riser, arranger) - "I'm Gonna Make You Love Me", "A Place in the Sun" and "Sweet Inspirations"
- Frank Wilson and Deke Richards, producers (Gene Page, arranger) - "This Guy's in Love with You", "Funky Broadway" and "I'll Try Something New"
- Smokey Robinson, Al Cleveland and Terry Johnson, producers (Paul Riser, arranger) - "I Second That Emotion" and "Then"
- Henry Cosby, producer (Paul Riser, arranger) - "Ain't No Mountain High Enough"
- Mary Wilson, Cindy Birdsong, Dennis Edwards, Eddie Kendricks, Paul Williams, Melvin Franklin, Otis Williams and The Andantes - background vocals

Instrumentation on "Try It Baby", "This Guy's in Love With You", "Funky Broadway", "I'll Try Something New" and "The Impossible Dream" is performed by Los Angeles area session musicians. On all other tracks, the instrumentation is provided by Motown's studio band, The Funk Brothers, with strings and horns by the Detroit Symphony Orchestra.

== Singles history ==
- "I'm Gonna Make You Love Me" b/w "A Place in the Sun" (Motown 1137, November 21, 1968)
- "I'll Try Something New" b/w "The Way You Do the Things You Do" (b-side taken from TCB) (Motown 1142, February 20, 1969)
- "I Second That Emotion" b/w "The Way You Do the Things You Do" (b-side taken from TCB) (Tamla-Motown 709, United Kingdom only, September 1969)

== Charts ==
=== Weekly charts ===
Chart (1968–69)	Peak position
Canada Top Albums/CDs (RPM)	5
UK Albums (Official Charts)	1
UK R&B Albums (Record Mirror)	1
US Billboard 200	2
US Top R&B/Hip-Hop Albums (Billboard)	1

=== Year-end charts ===
Chart (1969)	Rank
UK Albums (OCC)	10
US Billboard 200	55
US Top R&B/Hip-Hop Albums (Billboard)	16
US Cashbox Top 100	51

== Certifications ==
Region	Certification	Certified units/sales
United States (RIAA)	Gold	500,000^{^}
^{^} Shipments figures based on certification alone.
