= Manly Daniel Davis =

Housing developer (1879–1950)

Manly Daniel Davis (1879–1950) was a housing developer in Detroit as well as in its northern suburbs in Oakland County.

Davis was born in Pontiac, Michigan. He developed the Palmer Park and Sherwood Forest neighborhoods in what as then Greenfield Township, Michigan but would be later annexed into Detroit. He later was involved in subdivision development in Bloomfield Township, Oakland County, Michigan.
