= Take Me in Your Arms and Love Me =

Single by Gladys Knight & the Pips

from the album Everybody Needs Love
- B-side: "Do You Love Me Just a Little, Honey?"
- Released: 1967
- Genre: Soul
- Length: 2:56
- Label: Soul S-35033
- Songwriters: Barrett Strong, Cornelius Grant, Rodger Penzabene
- Producer: Norman Whitfield

"Take Me in Your Arms and Love Me" is a song and single by American group, Gladys Knight & the Pips written by Barrett Strong, Cornelius Grant and Rodger Penzabene. It was produced by Norman Whitfield.

== Background ==
It also appeared on their 1967 album Everybody Needs Love, where the song's erotic nature was censored. Critic John Lowe for AllMusic felt the editing "damaged the song's story structure" and "undermined Knight's erotic awareness for the song".

== Chart performance ==
Originally released in the US on the Soul label in 1967 with "Do You Love Me Just a Little, Honey" as the B-side, the song only charted at number 98 on the Hot 100. "Take Me in Your Arms and Love Me", however, did not chart on the national, Billboard's Top Selling R&B Singles chart. Overseas, it was later released in the UK in 1967 on the Tamla Motown label. It made number 13 in the UK charts in June 1967 and was Gladys Knight & the Pips' first UK hit.

== Cover versions ==
- Green Gartside teamed up with Sweetie Irie in 1991 for Scritti Politti's cover of "Take Me in Your Arms and Love Me", the follow-up to the top 20 hit "She's a Woman" with Shabba Ranks. Scritti Politti's version "Take Me in Your Arms and Love Me" peaked at No. 47 and came from the same B.E.F. recording sessions as Scritti Politti's cover of "She's a Woman" and Gartside's version of "I Don't Know Why I Love You" (from the B.E.F. album Music of Quality and Distinction, Volume 2).
- Florence Rawlings covered the song in 2010 for her debut album A Fool In Love.
