= Mandolin Wind =

Single by Rod Stewart

from the album The Best of Rod Stewart Vol. 2
- Released: 15 July 1977
- Genre: Soft rock, country rock
- Length: 5:33
- Label: Mercury
- Songwriter: Rod Stewart
- Producer: Rod Stewart

"Mandolin Wind" is a song written by Rod Stewart. It was first released on Stewart's 1971 album Every Picture Tells a Story and later as the B-side of a single from that album, his version of "(I Know) I'm Losing You." Mercury Records issued the song as a 7-inch single in mid-1977. It has also appeared on numerous Rod Stewart compilation and live albums, including Sing It Again Rod, Storyteller – The Complete Anthology: 1964–1990 and Unplugged...and Seated.

In 1972, "Mandolin Wind" was recorded by the Everly Brothers for their album Stories We Could Tell, and in 1977 it was recorded by Earl Scruggs for his album Strike Anywhere. It has also appeared on Everly Brothers and Earl Scruggs compilation albums.

"Mandolin Wind" has been highly praised by music critics. In his review of Every Picture Tells a Story in Rolling Stone, John Mendelsohn refers to the song as being "nearly as good" as the #1 single off the album, "Maggie May." Rock: The Rough Guide went further, calling the song the highlight of the album. Stewart Mason of Allmusic called the song "every bit...equal" to "Maggie May," and Allmusic's Stephen Thomas Erlewine called the song "unbearably poignant." Cash Box said it was "somewhat reminiscent of the introspective moments of 'Maggie May." Record World said it was "great despite 5:32 length." In its review of Every Picture Tells a Story, Billboard called "Mandolin Wind" an "excellent Stewart composition," and in its review of Stories We Could Tell the magazine noted that the song offered "great single potential." Rod Stewart biographers Tim Ewbank & Stafford Hildred refer to the song as "a stunning ballad."

The song combines elements of rock music and folk music. It uses mostly acoustic instruments, with a particularly prominent mandolin part. Stewart has stated that he "always thought the mandolin was such a romantic-sounding instrument." Stewart has stated that his "goal in life is to play 'Mandolin Wind' and make it sound like the record."

The identity of the mandolin player on "Mandolin Wind" is unclear. The liner notes state that "the mandolin was played by the mandolin player in Lindisfarne" but that Rod Stewart had forgotten his name. In 2003, Ray Jackson claimed to be the mandolin player on the album, at least for the song "Maggie May." Jackson is the mandolin player from English folk-rock band Lindisfarne. Mason attributes the mandolin playing to Martin Quittenton. The liner notes to Every Picture Tells a Story list Quittenton only as the acoustic guitar player.

In his 2015 book, Elton John, From Tin Pan Alley to the Yellow Brick Road, author Keith Hayward indicates the mandolin player might have been Davey Johnstone in one of his earlier session appearances prior to joining Elton John's band as his guitarist.
