= Sherwood Forest, Detroit =

Neighborhood in Detroit, Michigan

Coordinates: 42.4357°N 83.1367°W

Sherwood Forest is a neighborhood in Detroit, Michigan. The neighborhood is bounded by Seven Mile Road, Livernois, Pembroke, and Parkside. The community, with about 435 houses, consists of two subdivisions: Sherwood Forest and Sherwood Forest Manor.

The neighborhood was named after Sherwood Forest in Nottinghamshire, England which was the setting for the Robin Hood tales.

== History ==
Sherwood Forest was platted in 1917 by Manly Daniel Davis. The first house appeared in 1922. The Sherwood Forest Association opened in 1929. Most of the houses were built in the late 1920s and 1930s. In 2002 Sherwood Forest became a Detroit Historic District.

== Education ==
Sherwood Forest is within the Detroit Public Schools district. Residents are zoned to Palmer Park Preparatory Academy, formerly the Barbara Jordan School, for elementary and middle school. All residents are zoned to Mumford High School. Palmer Park is operated by teachers and not by a principal administrator.

Detroit Public Library operates the Sherwood Forest Branch Library at 7117 West Seven Mile Road. The library, named after the community, was established in 1942. The current facility opened on February 20, 1951.
