= The Best of Rod Stewart Vol. 2 =

Greatest hits album by Rod Stewart
- Released: 1 July 1977
- Recorded: 1969–1974
- Genre: Rock, pop
- Length: 78:12
- Label: Mercury Records
- Producer: Rod Stewart

Rod Stewart chronology
A Night on the Town (1976)	The Best of Rod Stewart Vol. 2 (1977)	Foot Loose & Fancy Free (1977)

Professional ratings
Review scores
Source	Rating
Allmusic	link
Christgau's Record Guide	B−

The Best of Rod Stewart Vol. 2 is a compilation album released by Rod Stewart in 1977 (see 1977 in music). It was released by Mercury Records as part of Stewart's contract before switching labels to Warner Bros. and moving to The United States. It includes tracks from all five of his Mercury albums.

== Album information ==
The Best of Rod Stewart Vol. 2 was originally released as a double-album. It was re-released as a Compact Disc in 1998 which includes all 19 tracks on a single disc. Unlike its predecessor, The Best of Rod Stewart, which focused on major hits, Volume 2 includes the minor and album-oriented songs. All of the tracks are from previously released Rod Stewart solo albums. The original failed to chart or reach a sales award.

== Track listing ==
1. "Man of Constant Sorrow" (previously released on An Old Raincoat Won't Ever Let You Down) – 3:12
2. "Blind Prayer" (previously released on An Old Raincoat Won't Ever Let You Down) – 4:36
3. "Lady Day" (previously released on Gasoline Alley) – 4:11
4. "Tomorrow is a Long Time" (previously released on Every Picture Tells a Story) – 3:43
5. "Country Comfort" (previously released on Gasoline Alley) – 4:43
6. "Mandolin Wind" (previously released on Every Picture Tells a Story) – 5:32
7. "That's All Right" (previously released on Every Picture Tells a Story) – 3:59
8. "My Way of Giving" (previously released on Gasoline Alley) – 3:56
9. "You're My Girl (I Don't Want to Discuss It)" (previously released on Gasoline Alley) – 4:29
10. "Reason to Believe" (previously released on Every Picture Tells a Story) – 4:09
11. "Italian Girls" (previously released on Never a Dull Moment) – 4:54
12. "I'd Rather Go Blind" (previously released on Never a Dull Moment) – 4:53
13. "Lost Paraguayos" (previously released on Never a Dull Moment) – 3:56
14. "True Blue" (previously released on Never a Dull Moment) – 3:31
15. "Sweet Little Rock 'N' Roller" (previously released on Smiler) – 3:42
16. "Hard Road" (previously released on Smiler) – 4:26
17. "(You Make Me Feel Like) A Natural Man" (previously released on Smiler) – 3:53
18. "Bring It On Home to Me/You Send Me" (previously released on Smiler) – 3:56
19. "Twistin' the Night Away" (previously released on Never a Dull Moment) – 3:13

== Personnel ==
- Produced by Rod Stewart and Lou Reizner
- Mastering by Suha Gur
- Photography by Sam Emerson and Aaron Sixx
- See original releases for more personnel
