= Cloud Nine (The Temptations album) =

Studio album by The Temptations
- Released: February 17, 1969
- Recorded: July 1967 – December 1968
- Studio: Hitsville U.S.A., Detroit
- Genre: Progressive soul; psychedelic soul
- Length: 34:35
- Label: Gordy
- Producer: Norman Whitfield

The Temptations chronology
Live at the Copa (1968)	Cloud Nine (1969)	The Temptations Show (1969)

Professional ratings
Review scores
Source	Rating
AllMusic	4.5/5 stars
Rolling Stone	(favourable)

Cloud Nine is the ninth studio album by American musical group The Temptations for the Gordy (Motown) label released in 1969.

The album marked a major turning point in the group's career. It is the first full Temptations studio LP to feature Dennis Edwards as the replacement for David Ruffin, who was fired in June 1968. It also marked the beginning of the Temptations' delve into psychedelic soul under the ambitious direction of producer Norman Whitfield. The change in style polarized longtime fans but proved highly successful, with the album rising to number four on the Billboard Pop Albums Chart. It earned the group their first Grammy Award in 1969.

== Background ==
Norman Whitfield took the Temptations into psychedelic territory after a suggestion from the group's de facto leader, Otis Williams. Williams had been discussing Sly & the Family Stone's music, and the changes it brought to the soul music industry, with his friend, producer Kenneth Gamble. Gamble agreed with Williams that Sly Stone's funkier production style and multi-lead vocals was here to stay and that it was time to learn to adapt to it.

While Williams, Whitfield, and Williams' then-wife Ann Cain were standing outside of the Casino Royale nightclub in Motown's home city of Detroit during the summer of 1968, Williams suggested that Whitfield might try to produce something like Sly & the Family Stone's "Dance to the Music" for their next single. The Temptations had been successful with romantic ballads such as "My Girl" and mid-tempo numbers such as "(I Know) I'm Losing You", but Williams, taking Gamble's advice, felt that it was time to update the group's sound. "Man, I don't want to be bothered with that shit," remarked Whitfield, who regarded the Family Stone sound as a "passing fancy".

== Overview ==
Regardless of his original opinion of Sly Stone's work, by the fall of 1968, Whitfield had the Temptations recording "Cloud Nine", which featured all five members (Otis Williams, the newly drafted Dennis Edwards, and founding members Eddie Kendricks, Paul Williams, and Melvin Franklin) trading lead vocals over a Family Stone-like instrumental track. Although Otis Williams denies the connection, "Cloud Nine's" lyrics have frequently been cited as empathizing with drug use.

The album's second single, "Run Away Child, Running Wild", delved further into unusual territory for the Temptations, turning a story about a lost runaway into a nine-minute epic of doo-wop vocals, droning organ lines, and hard-hitting drums similar to those typically heard in Sly & the Family Stone and James Brown records. Halfway through its running time, "Run Away Child" segues into an instrumental jam session (the single mix only includes the vocal half of the song). Future Temptations songs produced by Norman Whitfield, such as "Hum Along and Dance", "Smiling Faces Sometimes", and "Papa Was a Rollin' Stone", would further emphasize extended instrumental passages, often allowing said passages to overshadow the songs' vocals and as a result, The Temptations had him replaced by Jeffrey Bowen after the 1990 album.

Matthew Greenwald of AllMusic assessed the title track: "Heavily influenced by Sly Stone, the funky rhythms -- driven by a fabulous bed of drums, conga, and wah-wah electric guitar -- all coalesce to create a truly atmospheric funk record. As well, the band's trade-off gospel-inspired vocals take the song into the stratosphere. Lyrically, the song certainly seemed to have drug connotations, yet was apparently only about a 'state of mind.'"

== Track listing ==
Side one
No.	Title	Writer(s)	Leads(s)	Length
1.	"Cloud Nine"	Barrett Strong, Norman Whitfield	Edwards, Kendricks, P. Williams, Franklin, O. Williams	3:27
2.	"I Heard It Through the Grapevine"	Strong, Whitfield	Edwards, Kendricks	3:00
3.	"Run Away Child, Running Wild"	Strong, Whitfield	Edwards, Kendricks, P. Williams, Franklin, O. Williams	9:38

Side two
No.	Title	Writer(s)	Leads(s)	Length
1.	"Love is a Hurtin' Thing"	Ben Raleigh, Dave Linden	Edwards, Kendricks, Franklin	2:28
2.	"Hey Girl"	Gerry Goffin, Carole King	P. Williams	2:38
3.	"Why Did She Have to Leave Me (Why Did She Have to Go)"	Strong, Whitfield	Edwards	2:56
4.	"I Need Your Lovin'"	Strong, Whitfield	Kendricks	2:35
5.	"Don't Let Him Take Your Love From Me"	Strong, Whitfield	P. Williams	2:31
6.	"I Gotta Find a Way (To Get You Back)"	Strong, Whitfield, Eddie Holland, Cornelius Grant, Eddie Kendricks	Edwards	3:00
7.	"Gonna Keep on Tryin' till I Win Your Love"	Strong, Whitfield	Edwards	2:32

=== Unreleased track ===
- "Dinah" (Smokey Robinson, Al Cleveland) (lead singer: Eddie Kendricks) - produced by Smokey Robinson - subsequently released on Lost and Found: You've Got to Earn It (1962–1968).

== Personnel ==
The Temptations

- Dennis Edwards – vocals (tenor/baritone)
- Eddie Kendricks – vocals (tenor/falsetto)
- Paul Williams – vocals (baritone)
- Melvin Franklin – vocals (bass)
- Otis Williams – vocals (second tenor)

== Singles history ==
- "Cloud Nine"
  - Gordy single 7081, October 25, 1968; b-side: "Why Did She Have to Leave Me (Why Did She Have to Go)"
  - 1969 Grammy Award Winner: Best Rhythm & Blues Group Performance, Vocal or Instrumental
- "Run Away Child, Running Wild"
  - Gordy single 7084, January 30, 1969; b-side: "I Need Your Lovin'"

== Charts ==
=== Weekly charts ===
Chart (1969)	Peak position
UK Albums (OCC)	32
US Billboard 200	4

=== Singles ===
"Cloud Nine"	US Billboard Pop Singles	6
"Cloud Nine"	US Billboard R&B Singles	2
"Run Away Child, Running Wild"	US Billboard Pop Singles	6
"Run Away Child, Running Wild"	US Billboard R&B Singles	1

== Certifications ==
Region	Certification	Certified units/sales
United States (RIAA)	Gold	500,000^{^}
^{^} Shipments figures based on certification alone.
