= Maurizio Squillante =

Italian composer

Maurizio Squillante is an Italian composer. His opera The Wings of Dedalus premiered in 2004 and was recorded in 2017.
