= I'm Gonna Make You Love Me =

- US single picture sleeve

Single by Diana Ross & the Supremes and the Temptations

from the album Diana Ross & the Supremes Join the Temptations
- B-side: "A Place in the Sun"
- Released: November 21, 1968
- Recorded: May 3, May 18, May 31, June 20, August 26, September 4 and September 13, 1968
- Studio: Hitsville USA (Studios A & B)
- Genre: Soul; pop
- Length: 3:08
- Label: Motown; M 1137
- Songwriters: Gamble and Huff; Jerry Ross
- Producers: Frank Wilson; Nickolas Ashford

Diana Ross & the Supremes singles chronology
"Love Child" (1968)	"I'm Gonna Make You Love Me" (1968)	"I'm Livin' in Shame" (1969)

The Temptations singles chronology
"Cloud Nine" (1968)	"I'm Gonna Make You Love Me" (1968)	"Rudolph the Red-Nosed Reindeer" (1968)

"I'm Gonna Make You Love Me" is a soul song most popularly released as a joint single performed by Diana Ross & the Supremes and the Temptations for the Motown label. This version peaked for two weeks at No. 2 on the Hot 100 in the United States and at No. 3 on the UK Singles Chart in January 1969.

Written by Gamble and Huff and Jerry Ross, it was originally a top 20 R&B hit for Dee Dee Warwick in 1966 (U.S. No. 88 Pop). Madeline Bell's cover peaked at No. 26 on the Hot 100 on 23 March 1968.

== Early versions ==
Most versions of the song credit the songwriting to Jerry Ross and Kenny Gamble, who were the only two writers named on original record labels. Some recordings also credit Jerry Williams as a third writer, although BMI and some other sources credit Leon Huff, rather than Williams.

"I'm Gonna Make You Love Me" was released as a single by Dee Dee Warwick on Mercury Records as the follow-up to her Top Ten R&B hit "I Want to Be With You"; co-writer Jerry Ross produced the track whose arrangement was by Jimmy Wisner while Nickolas Ashford and Valerie Simpson provided background vocals. This single - whose B-side is the earliest known recorded version of "Yours Until Tomorrow" by Gerry Goffin and Carole King - reached No. 13 R&B crossing over to No. 88 Pop in December 1966.

Scoring two consecutive Top 20 R&B hits gave Warwick sufficient cachet for her first album release entitled I Want to Be With You/I'm Gonna Make You Love Me. Although Warwick had stronger chart showings than "I'm Gonna Make You Love Me", the song became her best-known hit by virtue of the Supremes/Temptations remake. "I'm Gonna Make You Love Me" was the song Warwick performed at the 1999 Rhythm and Blues Foundation awards ceremony when she received a Pioneer Award.

Jerry Ross overall produced ten recordings of "I'm Gonna Make You Love Me": these included a version on Jerry Butler's 1967 Soul Artistry album and another by Jay & the Techniques which was featured on the 1968 album release Love, Lost & Found. Ashford & Simpson sang background on all the versions of the song Ross produced with the Jay & the Techniques version also featuring Melba Moore.

== Madeline Bell version 1967 ==
"I'm Gonna Make You Love Me" was offered to Dusty Springfield who recorded for Philips Records, the UK equivalent of Mercury Records. Springfield passed the song on to Madeline Bell, her friend and regular background vocalist. Springfield sang backup vocals on Bell's version, which was featured on Bell's 1967 Philips album release Bell's a Poppin'.

According to Bell "nothing happened with [the album] and the tapes were sent over to America and this one guy took a shine to 'I’m Gonna Make You Love Me'. He printed up 10,000 copies and he sent them round the radio stations and they started playing it. I got a call from Philips in London to say that I had a record moving up the US charts and I had to go to America to promote it. It got to No. 26 [and No. 32 R&B/ April 1968] and it was great to go back to my home town (Newark, New Jersey) with a record in the charts. I was so happy to go home a success."

The US single of Bell's "I'm Gonna Make You Love Me" featured "Picture Me Gone" by Chip Taylor and Al Gorgoni as the B-side: originally issued on the Mod label it had its wide release with the Philips logo. Bell's US success led Philips to release her single in the UK - there the B-side was "I'm Gonna Leave You" a composition by Bell, Springfield and Lesley Duncan - where it failed to chart. An I'm Gonna Make You Love Me album became Bell's only full-length release to appear on a major chart reaching No. 46 on the US R&B album chart.

== Motown version 1968 ==
"I'm Gonna Make You Love Me" was the lead single, released in November 1968, from the duets album Diana Ross & the Supremes Join the Temptations; the track was produced by Frank Wilson along with Nickolas Ashford who had sung background on Dee Dee Warwick's track and the other versions produced by Jerry Ross. Diana Ross and Eddie Kendricks shared lead vocals, although Otis Williams worked with Ross during a spoken interlude which was original to this version of the song.

Ross & the Supremes and the Temptations performed several of the songs from their joint album on their headlining TCB television special which aired in December 1968 and it was originally planned that their rendition of "The Impossible Dream", the special's climactic performance, be their joint album's lead single. However radio stations began playing the "I'm Gonna Make You Love Me" track off their advance copies of Diana Ross & the Supremes Join the Temptations compelling Motown to make "I'm Gonna Make You Love Me" the single release even though it was not performed on TCB. Indeed, the Ross/Supremes & Temptations version was never to be performed live (the Temptations did perform "I'm Gonna Make You Love Me" on The Ed Sullivan Show, Diana Ross and the Supremes performed the song which was recorded during their farewell performance in Las Vegas in 1970 and Diana Ross performed the song on The Hollywood Palace as a duet with Stevie Wonder). A later version of both groups (after both Ross and Kendricks left) performed a live version of the song at Valley Forge in 1972 that can be found on YouTube.

"I'm Gonna Make You Love Me" reached No. 2 on both the Billboard Hot 100 and its R&B charts in January 1969: the Record World 100 Top Pops ranked "I'm Gonna Make You Love Me" at No. 1 for the three weeks of 4 January to 18 January 1969 while Cash Box ranked the single No. 1 on its chart for 25 January 1969. In the UK, the single peaked at number 3 in the Top 50, spending six weeks in the Top 10.

=== Track listing ===
- 7" Single (21 November 1968) (North America/United Kingdom/Netherlands/Sweden)
1. "I'm Gonna Make You Love Me" – 2:56
2. "A Place in the Sun" – 4:20

=== Personnel ===
- Lead vocals by Diana Ross and Eddie Kendricks
- Spoken interlude by Diana Ross and Otis Williams
- Background vocals by Mary Wilson, Cindy Birdsong, Eddie Kendricks, Otis Williams, Melvin Franklin, Paul Williams, Dennis Edwards, and The Andantes
- Produced by Frank Wilson and Nickolas Ashford
- Instrumentation by the Funk Brothers and the Detroit Symphony Orchestra

== Charts ==
=== Weekly charts ===
Chart (1968–1969)	Peak position
Australia (Go-Set)	17
Australia (Kent Music Report)	14
Belgium (Ultratop 50 Wallonia)	47
Canada Top Singles (RPM)	2
Iceland (Íslenski Listinn)	6
Ireland (IRMA)	6
Netherlands (Dutch Top 40)	27
Netherlands (Single Top 100)	19
New Zealand (Listener)	16
Sweden (Kvällstoppen)	7
UK Singles (Official Charts)	3
UK R&B (Record Mirror)	2
US Billboard Hot 100	2
US Hot R&B/Hip-Hop Songs (Billboard)	2
US Cash Box Top 100	1
US R&B Top 50 (Cash Box)	1
US Record World 100 Top Pops	1
US Record World Top 50 R&B	1

=== Year-end charts ===
Chart (1969)	Rank
Australia (Kent Music Report)	92
Canada Top Singles (RPM)	52
UK Singles (OCC)	55
US Billboard Hot 100	87
US Cash Box Top 100	49
US R&B (Cash Box)	23

== Certifications ==
Region	Certification	Certified units/sales
United States (RIAA)	Platinum	1,000,000^{^}
^{^} Shipments figures based on certification alone.
