= I Could Never Love Another (After Loving You) =

- Dutch release picture sleeve

Single by the Temptations

from the album The Temptations Wish It Would Rain
- B-side: "Gonna Give Her All the Love I've Got"
- Released: April 18, 1968
- Recorded: February 6, 8, 19; April 22; November 8, 1967
- Studio: Hitsville USA (Studio A), Detroit, Michigan
- Genre: Soul
- Length: 3:41
- Label: Gordy
- Songwriter(s): Norman Whitfield; Barrett Strong; Rodger Penzabene
- Producer(s): Norman Whitfield

The Temptations singles chronology
"I Wish It Would Rain" (1967)	"I Could Never Love Another (After Loving You)" (1968)	"Please Return Your Love to Me" (1968)

"I Could Never Love Another (After Loving You)" is a single recorded by the Temptations and released on Motown Records' Gordy label during the spring of 1968. The song is the last with lyrics by Rodger Penzabene, and was the final Temptations single to feature David Ruffin as lead singer.

Both "I Could Never Love Another" and the previous Temptations release, "I Wish It Would Rain", drew from Penzabene's real-life heart break over learning that his wife had been unfaithful. Unable to handle the extreme pain and unable to leave his wife, he wrote the songs as personal statements to her, publicizing the pain she caused him. After both songs were completed and recorded, Penzabene committed suicide.

David Ruffin portrays the narrator of "I Could Never Love Another", who asks his wife why she is suddenly ending their relationship after all their years together and all her proclamations of love. He then tells her that despite her infidelity, despite all the pain she's caused him, he'll never find love with another woman. "I Could Never Love Another" proved to be Ruffin's final performance as lead singer on a Temptations single, as Ruffin was fired from the group in June 1968 for what was considered increasingly unprofessional behavior and ego clashes.

"I Could Never Love Another" was the second single from the 1968 album The Temptations Wish It Would Rain. It peaked at number 13 on the Billboard Hot 100, and reached the number-one position on the Billboard R&B Singles chart. Following one more single from the LP, the Eddie Kendricks-led "Please Return Your Love to Me", the Temptations forged ahead into psychedelic soul territory with their new single, "Cloud Nine", and their new lead singer, Dennis Edwards.

Billboard described the single as "another sure-fire winner." Cash Box described it as "pop-styled blues" with "outstanding lead, delightful backup vocals and a terrific orchestral impact."

== Personnel ==
- Lead vocals by David Ruffin
- Background vocals by Eddie Kendricks, Melvin Franklin, Paul Williams, and Otis Williams
- Written by Norman Whitfield, Barrett Strong, and Rodger Penzabene
- Produced by Norman Whitfield
- Instrumentation by The Funk Brothers
