= Runaway Child, Running Wild =

"Run Away Child, Running Wild"
- German release picture sleeve

Single by The Temptations

from the album Cloud Nine
- B-side: "I Need Your Lovin'"
- Released: January 30, 1969
- Recorded: Hitsville U.S.A. (Studio A); Detroit, Michigan; October 31 and December 16, 1968
- Genre: Psychedelic soul
- Length: 4:53 (Single edit); 9:36 (Album version)
- Label: Gordy; G 7084
- Songwriter(s): Norman Whitfield; Barrett Strong
- Producer(s): Norman Whitfield

The Temptations singles chronology
"Rudolph the Red-Nosed Reindeer" (1968)	"Run Away Child, Running Wild" (1969)	"I'll Try Something New" (1969)

"Runaway Child, Running Wild" (shown as "Run Away Child, Running Wild" on the label of the original single) is a 1969 hit single for the Gordy (Motown) label, performed by The Temptations and produced by Norman Whitfield. The single was both the second from their landmark Cloud Nine LP, and the second of their "psychedelic soul" tracks penned by Whitfield and former Motown artist Barrett Strong.

Featuring all five Temptations - Dennis Edwards, Eddie Kendricks, Paul Williams, Melvin Franklin, and Otis Williams - trading verses and harmony lines, "Runaway Child, Running Wild" paints a tale of a young boy (presumably a preteen) who runs away from home after being punished for playing hooky i.e. absence from school without permission. The boy wanders the dark streets alone, eventually realizing he cannot survive on his own, but cannot find his way home, and ends up lost, frightened by strangers, unfamiliar landmarks, and his own thoughts. "Runaway child runnin' wild," the Temptations tell the boy during the chorus, "you better go back home/where you belong".

The Temptations alternately express and depict his fears, with the tension of the record building to a climax over the first five minutes of the record. At this point, the vocals fade out, and the record briefly gives voice to its young protagonist, who cries desperately for his mother before fading into the mix. "Runaway Child" then segues into an extended instrumental passage, during which Earl Van Dyke's Hammond organ, Joe Messina's electric guitar, and Dennis Coffey's distorted wah-wah pedal guitar take center stage for four minutes. After the instrumental builds the song up to a second climax, the track is stripped to the bassline and repeating hi-hat figure, and The Temptations return to the mix to issue one final admonition to the runaway: "Listen to your heart beat/it's beating much too fast/go back home/where you belong".

The single version of "Runaway Child" only features the first five minutes of the song, fading out before the instrumental section begins. Cash Box described the single as "a pulsing track with excellent and non-objectionable teen-related lyrics that should have the approval of parents through its 'drop back in' message."

"Runaway Child, Running Wild" is often cited as one of the best songs on the subject of runaways, and Temptation Otis Williams often hears from fans that the record's terrifying depiction of running away kept them from doing so as children. The single peaked at number one on the Billboard Hot Rhythm & Blues Singles, and reached #6 on the Billboard Pop Singles chart. Earl Van Dyke, who performs the prominent organ solo during the instrumental section of the record, recorded his own instrumental version of "Runaway Child, Running Wild", which was released as a single the same year.

== Personnel ==
- Lead and background vocals by Dennis Edwards, Eddie Kendricks, Paul Williams, Melvin Franklin, and Otis Williams.
- Instrumentation by The Funk Brothers, with featured solos by Earl Van Dyke (Hammond organ), Joe Messina (electric guitar), and Dennis Coffey (wah-wah guitar).
