= Please Return Your Love to Me =

Single by The Temptations

from the album The Temptations Wish It Would Rain
- B-side: "How Can I Forget"
- Released: July 16, 1968
- Recorded: Hitsville USA; 1968
- Genre: Soul
- Length: 2:21
- Label: Gordy; G 7074
- Songwriters: Norman Whitfield; Barrett Strong; Barbara Neely
- Producer: Norman Whitfield

The Temptations singles chronology
"I Could Never Love Another (After Loving You)" (1968)	"Please Return Your Love to Me" / "How Can I Forget" (1968)	"Cloud Nine" (1968)

"Please Return Your Love to Me" is a 1968 hit single by The Temptations for the Gordy (Motown) label. Produced by Norman Whitfield, who co-wrote the song with Barrett Strong and Barbara Neely, it is the last single to feature David Ruffin in the lineup (he is featured in the background). With Eddie Kendricks singing lead (his first as a solo lead vocalist since 1966's "Get Ready"), it peaked on the Billboard Hot 100 Pop charts in the Top 30 at number 26, and number 4 on the Billboard R&B Singles charts. Billboard described the single as a "strong easy beat ballad loaded with sales appeal." Cash Box said that it is "in a slow vein that carries new shades of power in the group’s familiar style" and is "backed by the solid Motown rhythm section."

The B-side, "How Can I Forget", is led by Paul Williams and was allegedly one of the earliest songs recorded by the group after Ruffin's departure. Though "How Can I Forget" was also covered by Marvin Gaye, the Temptations' original did not appear on any album or compilation until 1994's Emperors of Soul box set.

== Personnel ==
- Lead vocals by Eddie Kendricks
- Background vocals by Melvin Franklin, Paul Williams, David Ruffin, and Otis Williams
- Written by Norman Whitfield and Barrett Strong
- Produced by Norman Whitfield
- Instrumentation by The Funk Brothers
