= Rick Squillante =

American DJ and record producer (1948 - 2001)

- Born: 17 August 1948
- Died: 21 April 2001 (aged 52)
- Occupations: nightclub disc jockey and music industry representative and record producer

Rick Squillante (August 17, 1948 – April 21, 2001) was a nightclub disc jockey and music industry representative and record producer, who rose to fame during the 1980s as the principal DJ at the Starck Club in Dallas, Texas. He has been noted as a major influence on many of today's modern DJs in the dance music trade.

== History ==
Squillante started his career in the late 1970s in San Antonio, Texas, eventually becoming the resident DJ at the city's popular dance club Bonham Exchange. After several years at the venue, Rick moved on to become the principal DJ at Dallas' Starck Club. Designed by Philippe Starck and financed by Dallas businessman Blake Woodall, the club's investors included music star Stevie Nicks, who performed on opening night along with Grace Jones on Memorial Day weekend of 1984. The nightclub became a celebrity hangout, attracting Robert Plant, Annie Lennox, Prince and Rob Lowe. It was noted as one of the first locations where the drug MDMA became popular. Squillante is credited with breaking several hit dance records while a DJ at the Starck Club, including Uptown Girl's version of" (I Know) I'm Losing You", which reached No. 85 on Billboard's Hot 100. Squillante's mixes emphasized multiple genres including European techno and synthpop, highlighted by Pet Shop Boys, New Order, Yaz, Heaven 17 and Section 25.

== Record industry ==
Through connections made at the Starck Club, Squillante eventually landed a job working for the Resource Record Pool in Los Angeles. He moved to the city in 1989 and was hired at Virgin Records in Beverly Hills, which became a directorship of Virgin's dance department in New York. In 1993, Squillante was the executive producer of a Virgin Records compilation album, Aural Opiates, which included tracks by Heaven 17 and Massive Attack (reviewed in Issue No. 2 of CMJ New Music Monthly). During this time, Squillante helped Janet Jackson's career become an international success and was awarded his own label imprint, Virgin Underground (VU), dedicated to innovative club-based music. The label creation was triggered by the success of a one-off underground club single Squillante signed from Philadelphia techno/house DJ and producer Josh Wink, released under his Size 9 alter ego, entitled "I Am Ready." The record topped the Billboard Dance Chart and became a pop success throughout Europe. "That little record - which no one expected a lot from - was suddenly a huge international hit", Squillante told Billboard in January 1997. "The next step was to see if we could make that happen again." He moved to New York City and Virgin Underground released singles from Swedish producer DJ Pierre J, Los Angeles-based Groove Junkies, and, most notably "Spin Spin Sugar" from British trip-hop forerunners Sneaker Pimps. The club mixes, released on Virgin Underground featured a reworking from New York producer and remixer Armand Van Helden. Heavily influenced by the burgeoning UK drum and bass movement, Van Helden incorporated its trademark sub bass sounds into his rugged "Dark Garage Remix." The record peaked at #2 on the U.S. Billboard Dance Chart, but caused a sensation in the UK. Many credible DJs, producers and dance music historians cite it as the record that invented "speed garage", a house music subgenre popular in the late 1990s, characterized by skittering four-on-the-floor beats and deep, oozing bass parts. Despite these successes, music industry mergers and cutbacks put VU Records on the chopping block and Squillante was eventually laid off by Virgin Records in 1998. During the following years, he was not involved in the music or DJ industry, and most people acquainted with him said he simply "dropped out of the scene."

On April 21, 2001, for unknown reasons, Squillante committed suicide.

== Influence ==
Many DJs reference the work done by Squillante as having shaped and influenced the modern Dallas dance music scene. Wade Randolph Hampton, better known as DJ WishFM, music supervisor and actor in the Sony Pictures Classics film Groove, noted Squillante's influence in a March 2006 interview calling him "the original hero of the Starck Club who showed me the way." Hampton also said, "Much like Nicky Siano was (Studio) 54's legend, Starck's major DJ force, the late Rick Squillante, broke new ground – night after night. His flawless mixing and uncanny ability to merge disparate parts into a magnificent sum will forever be the standard for Starck disciples.

== See also ==
- Notable Club DJs
