= Just One Last Look =

Song performed by The Temptations

Song by The Temptations

from the album The Temptations with a Lot o' Soul
- Recorded: Hitsville USA (Studio A); 1966
- Genre: Soul, R&B, Pop
- Length: 2:49
- Label: Gordy
- Songwriter(s): Holland–Dozier–Holland
- Producer(s): Lamont Dozier, Brian Holland

"Just One Last Look"

Song by Four Tops
- Released: 2005
- Recorded: Hitsville USA (Studio A); 1966
- Genre: Soul, R&B, Pop
- Length: 3:09
- Label: Motown
- Songwriter(s): Holland–Dozier–Holland
- Producer(s): Lamont Dozier, Brian Holland

"Just One Last Look" is a 1966 song written and produced by Motown's main production team Holland–Dozier–Holland, and recorded by The Temptations for the Gordy (Motown) label, and The Four Tops for the main Motown label. Intended for release as a single for both, it was blocked from doing so and shelved.

The recording is a break-up song. The song's narrator (Levi Stubbs for the Four Tops, David Ruffin for the Temptations) asks his love, who's leaving them, to allow him "one last look" at her so that he'll always have memories of her.

In The Temptations' case, they were one of the few major Motown acts never to release a single produced by the trio, due to (previously) Berry Gordy, Jr., Smokey Robinson, and (then currently) Norman Whitfield having a tight hold on the group's released material. (Only Edward Holland, Jr. would have any success with the group, as Whitfield's co-writer.) Brian Holland and Lamont Dozier had to in fact fight for the chance to produce "Just One Last Look" for the Temptations, and Whitfield successfully blocked its release as a single. This song would go on to be released as an album track on "The Temptations with a Lot o' Soul". "Just One Last Look" remains the only H-D-H produced track to appear on any Temptations studio album, and would be the last of only two times (the previous being "A Tear from a Woman's Eyes") in which H-D-H would produce any material for the group.

While the Tempts' version was similar to then recent hits The Four Tops had released, the Tops' version had a harder sound and was mid tempo. This was recorded around the time H-D-H decided to give both them and The Supremes a harder edge on their songs. However H-D-H was also unsuccessful in getting The Four Tops version released as well, and it would go unreleased until the 2005 CD "Lost Without You: Motown Lost & Found".

== Personnel ==
=== Temptations version ===
- Lead vocals by David Ruffin
- Background vocals by Eddie Kendricks, Melvin Franklin, Paul Williams, and Otis Williams
- Instrumentation by The Funk Brothers

=== Four Tops version ===
- Lead vocals by Levi Stubbs.
- Background Vocals by Renaldo "Obie" Benson, Lawrence Payton, Abdul "Duke" Fakir and The Andantes: Jackie Hicks, Marlene Barrow, and Louvain Demps.
- Instrumentation by The Funk Brothers

== See also ==
The Temptations with a Lot o' Soul

== Notes ==
- http://www.funtrivia.com/en/music/temptations-the-12969.html
- http://www.warr.org/tempts.html
- http://www.hip-oselect.com/scr.public.product.asp?product_id=25307197-ccb2-574e-097d-be1885ff773d
- http://designermagazine.tripod.com/TheTemptationsINT1.html
- Williams, Otis, and Patricia Romanowski (1988, updated 2002). Temptations. Lanham, MD: Cooper Square. ISBN 0-8154-1218-5.
- Ribowsky, Mark (2010). Ain't Too Proud To Beg: The Troubled Lives and Enduring Soul of The Temptations. Hoboken, New Jersey: John Wiley & Sons. ISBN 978-0-470-26117-0.
