= You're My Everything (The Temptations song) =

1967 single by The Temptations

- Dutch release picture sleeve

Single by the Temptations

from the album The Temptations with a Lot o' Soul
- B-side: "I've Been Good to You"
- Released: June 13, 1967
- Recorded: Hitsville USA (Studio A); 1967
- Genre: Soul
- Length: 3:12
- Label: Gordy; G 7063
- Songwriter(s): Norman Whitfield; Cornelius Grant; Rodger Penzabene
- Producer(s): Norman Whitfield

The Temptations singles chronology
| "All I Need" / "Sorry Is a Sorry Word" (1967) | "You're My Everything" / "I've Been Good to You" (1967) | "(Loneliness Made Me Realize) It's You That I Need" (1967) |

The Temptations with a Lot O' Soul track listing
- 1. "(I Know) I'm Losing You"; 2. "Ain't No Sun Since You've Been Gone"; 3. "All I Need"; 4. "(Loneliness Made Me Realize) It's You That I Need"; 5. "No More Water in the Well"; 6. "Save My Love for a Rainy Day"; 7. "Just One Last Look"; 8. "Sorry Is a Sorry Word"; 9. "You're My Everything"; 10. "Now That You've Won Me"; 11. "Two Sides to Love"; 12. "Don't Send Me Away"

"You're My Everything" is a 1967 single recorded by the Temptations for Berry Gordy's Motown record label. It reached number three on the U.S. R&B chart and number six on the U.S. Pop chart. It was the third single from the group's 1967 album The Temptations with a Lot o' Soul.

== History ==
"You're My Everything" was the first of three singles and four songs to be co-written for the group by Motown songwriter Rodger Penzabene.

It was the second of two A-sides led by vocalist Eddie Kendricks since David Ruffin, who leads on the bridge and ad-libs on the outro, became the Temptations' lead singer, the previous being the 1966 song "Get Ready".

The single is backed by a cover of the Miracles' "I've Been Good to You", also led by Kendricks. It was one of the few singles released by the Temptations from which both sides charted. It peaked at number twenty-four on the Billboard Bubbling Under Hot 100 charts. The song has been covered by a number of artists, including Gladys Knight & the Pips and Fred Hughes both in 1968, and by Lloyd Charmers in 1974.

== Personnel ==
- Eddie Kendricks and David Ruffin (lead vocals, bridge and outro)
- David Ruffin, Melvin Franklin, Paul Williams and Otis Williams (backing vocals)
- Cornelius Grant (guitar)
- The Funk Brothers (other instrumentation)
