= I Wish It Would Rain =

1967 single by The Temptations

Single by The Temptations

from the album The Temptations Wish It Would Rain
- B-side: "I Truly, Truly Believe"
- Released: December 21, 1967
- Recorded: Hitsville USA (Studio A); April 22 and August 31, 1967
- Genre: Soul
- Length: 2:49
- Label: Gordy; G 7068
- Songwriters: Norman Whitfield; Barrett Strong; Rodger Penzabene
- Producer: Norman Whitfield

The Temptations singles chronology
"(Loneliness Made Me Realize) It's You That I Need" (1967)	"I Wish It Would Rain" (1967)	"I Could Never Love Another (After Loving You)" (1968)

"I Wish It Would Rain" is a 1967 song recorded by the Temptations for the Motown label (under the "Gordy" imprint) and produced by Norman Whitfield. The lyrics of this mournful song about a heartbroken man whose woman had just left him were penned by Motown staff writer Rodger Penzabene. The lyricist had just learned that his wife was cheating on him and in his sorrow and pain, Penzabene penned both this and its follow-up "I Could Never Love Another (After Loving You)." Tragically the distraught Penzabene committed suicide barely a week after the single's release.

== Release ==
Issued with the Melvin Franklin-led "I Truly, Truly Believe" as its B-side, "I Wish It Would Rain" peaked for three weeks in February and March 1968 at number four on the Billboard Hot 100 pop singles chart and at the number-one position on the Billboard R&B singles chart. The single was the focal point of the Temptations' 1968 album The Temptations Wish It Would Rain.

Billboard described the single as an "easy beat blues rocker" that "will soar to the top in short order." Cash Box said that "touches of Bacharachian style add a refreshingly new dimension to the terrific sound of the Temptations" and that "hard percussion and coasting strings give a solidity and gentleness to the soul vocal."

== Personnel ==
- Lead vocals by David Ruffin
- Background vocals by Eddie Kendricks, Melvin Franklin, Paul Williams, and Otis Williams
- Written by Norman Whitfield, Barrett Strong, and Rodger Penzabene
- Produced by Norman Whitfield
- Instrumentation by The Funk Brothers.

== Notable cover versions ==
"I Wish It Would Rain" has been covered by a number of artists, most prominently by:

- Gladys Knight & the Pips, peaking in the US at number 41 pop and 15 R&B.
- New Zealand singer songwriter Jon Stevens recorded and released a version of the song in 1994, with money raised benefiting drought-stricken farmers. The song peaked at number 49 in New Zealand.
