= Cloud Nine (The Temptations song) =

- One of the side labels of the Canadian single

Single by The Temptations

from the album Cloud Nine
- B-side: "Why Did She Have to Leave Me (Why Did She Have to Go)"
- Released: October 25, 1968
- Recorded: Hitsville USA (Studio B/Golden World); October 1, 1968
- Genre: Psychedelic soul; psychedelic funk
- Length: 3:37
- Label: Gordy; G 7081
- Songwriter(s): Norman Whitfield; Barrett Strong
- Producer(s): Norman Whitfield

The Temptations singles chronology
"Please Return Your Love To Me" (1968)	"Cloud Nine" (1968)	"I'm Gonna Make You Love Me" (1968)

"Cloud Nine" is a 1968 hit single recorded by The Temptations for the Motown label. It was the first of their singles to feature Dennis Edwards instead of David Ruffin in the lineup, was the first of producer Norman Whitfield's psychedelic soul tracks, and won Motown its first Grammy Award. The song was written by Whitfield and former Motown artist Barrett Strong.

== Background ==
In 1968, Sly & the Family Stone had a hit with their single "Dance to the Music", and Temptations member Otis Williams introduced Norman Whitfield to the band's music. At first, Whitfield did not want to produce anything with such a radically different sound. "I don't want to get into all that crazy shit," he said. "That ain't nothing but a little passing fancy." Within a few weeks, however, he had created the backing tracks for the newest Temptations single, a psychedelic-styled number called "Cloud Nine", and stuck primarily to such songs well into the early 1970s.

== Recording ==
Featuring all five Temptations trading lead vocals à la The Family Stone, "Cloud Nine" was a marked departure from the standard Tempts sound: wah-wah guitars and a harder, driving beat propelled the record, as opposed to pianos and strings. The song also features the Cuban percussionist Mongo Santamaria on conga drums. Edwards, Eddie Kendricks and Paul Williams swap leads on the verses, bridges and choruses, such as this example from the first bridge:

Paul Williams: "You can be what you wanna be..."
Dennis Edwards: "You ain't got no responsibility..."
Eddie Kendricks: "And every man, every man is free..."
Dennis Edwards: "And you're a million miles from reality..."

Otis Williams has some brief lead lines on the last half of the song (i.e.: he repeats "Reality…"), and Melvin Franklin also gets a line near the end ("There's no difference between day and night…"). The lyrics for the song were about the struggles and pains of living poor, as opposed to being about relationship and love troubles. The broke, unemployed, and despondent main character in the song proclaims that he gets over all of his problems by "riding high on 'cloud nine'". This has been interpreted by many (including Motown head Berry Gordy) as a reference to drug abuse, although Whitfield, Strong, and The Temptations deny that "Cloud Nine" is about drugs.

Cash Box called it "near revolutionary," praising the "touches of progressive pop in the track, elevated lyric message and the solid performance." Record World said that "the kids will be on cloud nine when they hear it."

"Cloud Nine" won Motown its first Grammy Award in 1969 for Best Rhythm & Blues Group Performance, Vocal or Instrumental, reached #2 in the U.S. R&B chart and #6 in the U.S. Pop chart, and led the way for the Temptations' full-blown venture into psychedelia, with increasingly eclectic and socio-political-themed records, including "Runaway Child, Running Wild", "Psychedelic Shack", and "Ball of Confusion (That's What the World Is Today)", following within the coming two years.

== Personnel ==
- Lead and background vocals by Dennis Edwards (verses; choruses; bridge; ad-libs), Eddie Kendricks (verses; choruses; bridge; ad-libs), Paul Williams (verses; choruses; bridge; ad-libs), Melvin Franklin (last verse; ad-libs), and Otis Williams (last verse; bridge; outro; ad-libs)
- Instrumentation by The Funk Brothers, featuring:
  - Bass guitar: James Jamerson
  - Lead guitar: Dennis Coffey
  - Drums: Spider Webb, Uriel Jones
  - Tambourine: Greg Reeves

== Other recordings ==
Mongo Santamaria recorded his own, instrumental version in 1969 for the Stone Soul album; released as a single (Columbia 4-44740), it reached #32 Pop, #33 R&B and #30 Easy Listening.

== Certifications ==
Region	Certification	Certified units/sales
United States (RIAA)	Gold	500,000^{^}
^{^} Shipments figures based on certification alone.
