= (I Know) I'm Losing You =

1966 single recorded by The Temptations

- Dutch release picture sleeve

Single by the Temptations

from the album The Temptations with a Lot o' Soul
- B-side: "I Couldn't Cry If I Wanted To"
- Released: November 1966
- Recorded: 1966
- Studio: Hitsville USA, Detroit
- Genre: Soul
- Length: 2:30
- Label: Gordy
- Songwriters: Norman Whitfield; Edward Holland, Jr.; Cornelius Grant
- Producer: Norman Whitfield

The Temptations singles chronology
| "Beauty Is Only Skin Deep" (1966) | "(I Know) I'm Losing You" (1966) | "All I Need" (1967) |

"(I Know) I'm Losing You"

Single by Rare Earth

from the album Ecology
- B-side: "When Joanie Smiles"
- Released: July 1970
- Recorded: Hitsville USA (Studio A); 1970
- Genre: Funk rock
- Length: 3:36 (single edit); 10:56 (album version)
- Label: Rare Earth; R 5021
- Songwriters: Norman Whitfield; Edward Holland, Jr.; Cornelius Grant
- Producer: Norman Whitfield

Rare Earth singles chronology
| "Get Ready" (1970) | "(I Know) I'm Losing You" (1970) | "Born to Wander" (1970) |

"(I Know) I'm Losing You"

Single by Rod Stewart With Faces

from the album Every Picture Tells a Story
- B-side: "Mandolin Wind"
- Released: 1971
- Recorded: 1971
- Genre: Hard rock; blues rock; soul
- Length: 5:23
- Label: Mercury Records
- Songwriters: Norman Whitfield; Edward Holland, Jr.; Cornelius Grant
- Producer: Rod Stewart

Rod Stewart With Faces singles chronology
| "Reason to Believe" / "Maggie May" (1971) | "(I Know) I'm Losing You" (1971) | "Dirty Old Town" (1971) |

"(I Know) I'm Losing You"

Single by Uptown
- Released: 1983
- Genre: Electronic dance music
- Length: 4:05
- Label: Oak Lawn Records OLR-121
- Songwriter: Norman WhitfieldEdward Holland, Jr.: Cornelius Grant
- Producers: Jack Malken; Scott Yahney; (Associate producer: David Hilzendager), (Associate producer: Ray Cooper)

"(I Know) I'm Losing You" is a 1966 hit single recorded by the Temptations for the Gordy (Motown) label, written by Cornelius Grant, Eddie Holland and Norman Whitfield, and produced by Norman Whitfield.

The group performed the song live on the CBS variety program The Ed Sullivan Show on May 28, 1967, and in a duet with Diana Ross & the Supremes later that year, on November 19, 1967.

== Background ==
Billboard described the song as a "blues swinger with a solid dance beat and powerful vocal workout." Cash Box said that "the (w)ork is throbbing, the chorus is smooth and the group tells its sad tale in exquisite fashion."

== Personnel ==
- Lead vocals by David Ruffin
- Background vocals by Eddie Kendricks, Paul Williams, Melvin Franklin and Otis Williams
- Guitar by Cornelius Grant
- Other instrumentation by the Funk Brothers
- Arrangements by Wade Marcus and Paul Riser

== Chart performance ==
"(I Know) I'm Losing You" was a No. 1 hit on the Billboard R&B singles chart, and reached No. 8 on the Billboard Pop Singles chart. In Canada the song reached No. 21, while in the UK it reached No. 19.

== Later versions ==
- "(I Know) I'm Losing You" was a 1970 version by Motown rock band Rare Earth for their Ecology album. Rare Earth's 10-minute recording was edited for single release and peaked at No. 7, one position higher than the Temptations' original on the U.S. pop charts. It also reached #15 in Canada.
- Rod Stewart recorded a version in 1971 that was featured on his breakthrough album Every Picture Tells A Story. The single reached #24 on the Billboard Hot 100, credited as Rod Stewart With Faces, #12 in the Netherlands and #13 in Canada. Stewart had previously performed the song with the Jeff Beck Group; live performances were recorded for BBC radio broadcast on the Saturday Club March 7, 1967.
- The Undisputed Truth, a group assembled and produced solely by Norman Whitfield, recorded a cover version of the song in a psychedelic funk style for their 1975 album Cosmic Truth.
- During the 1980s, on the Dallas, Texas-based Oak Lawn Records label, the song was recorded by the group Uptown and transformed into an upbeat dance tune. This version achieved popularity at Dallas' famed Starck nightclub due to early play by DJ Rick Squillante and became a standard in many U.S. nightclubs, reaching the No. 80 spot on the Billboard Hot 100 in 1987.
- Kanye West used the vocal samples from both Rare Earth and The Undisputed Truth covers in his song "Fade", which features vocals by Post Malone and Ty Dolla Sign from his seventh studio album, The Life of Pablo.
