= Dennis Edwards =

American soul and R&B singer (1943–2018)

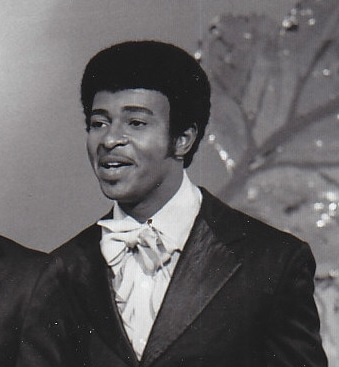
- Edwards in 1969

Background information
- Born: Dennis Edwards Jr. February 3, 1943; Fairfield, Alabama, U.S.
- Origin: Detroit, Michigan, U.S.
- Died: February 1, 2018 (aged 74) Chicago, Illinois, U.S.
- Genres: R&B; soul
- Occupation: Singer
- Instrument: Vocals
- Years active: 1961–2018
- Labels: Motown; International Soulville
- Website: The Temptations Review on MySpace

Dennis Edwards Jr. (February 3, 1943 – February 1, 2018) was an American soul and R&B singer who was best known as the frontman in The Temptations for Motown Records. Edwards joined the Temptations in 1968, replacing David Ruffin and sang with the group from 1968 to 1976, 1979 to 1983, and 1987 to 1988. In the mid-1980s, he launched a solo career, recording the 1984 hit single "Don't Look Any Further" (featuring Siedah Garrett). Until his death, Edwards was the lead singer of The Temptations Review, a Temptations splinter group.

== Biography ==
=== Early years and career ===
Edwards was born in Fairfield, Alabama, about eight miles from Birmingham, to Reverend Dennis Edwards Sr. and Idessa Fuller. He began singing at two years old in his father's church. The Edwards family moved to Detroit, Michigan when Edwards was about ten years old. He would continue to sing in the church pastored by his father, eventually becoming choir director.

As a teenager, Edwards joined a gospel vocal group called The Mighty Clouds of Joy, and studied piano and musical composition at the Detroit Conservatory of Music. After learning that Sam Cooke had switched from gospel to secular music, he organized his own soul/jazz group, Dennis Edwards and the Firebirds in 1961. Back at home, he was not allowed to sing or listen to secular music due to his mother's disapproval of a secular music career. In 1966, Edwards recorded a single for the obscure Detroit label, International Soulville Records, "I Didn't Have to (But I Did)" b/w "Johnnie on the Spot".

From January 1961 to December 1963, Edwards served as a field artilleryman in the U.S. Army, spending most of his enlistment stationed in Europe. His last major duty assignment was with Headquarters Battery, 2nd Howitzer Battalion, 35th Artillery, Seventh Army.

In 1966, with help from James Jamerson, Edwards auditioned for Detroit's Motown Records, where he was signed but placed on retainer. Although Edwards intended to be a solo act, he was instead assigned to join The Contours after their lead singer, Billy Gordon, fell ill. A year later, the Contours were the opening act for the Temptations; Temptations members Eddie Kendricks and Otis Williams took notice of Edwards and made his acquaintance. At the time, they were considering replacing their own lead singer, David Ruffin (who was a personal friend of Edwards).

=== 1968–1976: The Temptations years ===
Later in 1967, Edwards quit the Contours and was placed back on retainer. He attempted to be released from his contract, as Holland–Dozier–Holland had promised to sign him to their new Invictus Records. However, he was drafted in late June 1968 to join the Temptations, who had just fired Ruffin from the act. Ruffin had tipped Edwards off that he was being drafted as his replacement, which eased Edwards's conscience in replacing him.

The Temptations' new lineup debuted in July 1968 at the Forum in Los Angeles, where the first half of the concert was performed by the four original members. Edwards then performed during the last half. The Temptations officially introduced Edwards on July 9, 1968, on stage in Valley Forge, Pennsylvania. However, Ruffin, who was attempting to make his way back into the group, crashed the stage during Edwards's lead vocal on "Ain't Too Proud to Beg" to significant applause. He continued similar stunts for about a month until, according to Edwards, the group decided to lay-off Edwards — with the promise of a solo deal from Motown — and rehire Ruffin. When Ruffin failed to show for his return engagement in Gaithersburg, Maryland the next night, Edwards was permanently kept on and the Temptations refused to entertain rehiring Ruffin any further.

Edwards' first album with the Temptations was Live at the Copa, recorded at the group's return to the Copacabana nightclub. A year later, their next studio album Cloud Nine marked a new musical direction into psychedelic soul by Norman Whitfield. The title single charted at number 6 on the U.S. pop chart and garnered the 1969 Grammy Award for Best Rhythm & Blues Group Performance, Vocal or Instrumental. Subsequent hit singles followed, including "I Can't Get Next to You" (1969), "Ball of Confusion (That's What the World Is Today)" (1970) and "Papa Was a Rollin' Stone" (1972).

According to Otis Williams' account, during the recording of "Papa Was a Rollin' Stone", Edwards was allegedly angered by the song's first verse: "It was the third of September/That day I'll always remember/'cause that was the day/that my daddy died", as his father was said to have died on the third of September. However, Edwards disputed the account stating his father had actually died on the third of October. The single charted at number 5 on the R&B chart and won four 1972 Grammy Awards. Further creative disputes between Whitfield and the Temptations broke due to Whitfield's overemphasis on the musical composition over the vocals, as apparent with the song "Masterpiece" (1973). The Temptations next recruited Jeffrey Bowen as their producer, with the 1975 album A Song for You. The album had two number-one R&B singles, "Happy People" (1974) and "Shakey Ground" (1975).

For Wings of Love, Bowen favored Edwards' lead vocals at the group's expense. According to Williams, Bowen had never bothered recording the background vocals, or mixed them audibly lower than Edwards' vocals. During the recording sessions, Bowen had taken Edwards aside telling him,

"You don't need to be with them guys. I can cut you into things, Dennis. You could be bigger on your own."

Bowen disputed he had done so because the album's production had fallen behind. By this point, Edwards' cocaine use had worsened, leading to him missing rehearsals and team meetings. In 1976, while the Temptations were departing Motown for Atlantic Records, Williams fired Edwards because of his "intolerable attitude".

=== 1977–1983: Attempted solo career, second stint with the Temptations ===
Because Edwards was still under contract, he negotiated with Motown to pursue a solo career. During the contractual negotiations, Edwards went ahead and recorded an album. A deal failed to materialize, and Edwards' solo album was shelved. He later went to work for his uncle's company in Cleveland, laying down concrete driveways.

In late 1979, Edwards rejoined the Temptations after his replacement Louis Price left the group. According to Williams, he told Edwards he would not "tolerate any nonsense". The Temptations re-signed with Motown with their 1980 studio album Power. The lead single "Power", with Edwards back on lead vocals, topped number 11 on the R&B chart but fell below the top 40 on the pop charts.

With Edwards back, Motown decided to engineer a Temptations reunion album in 1982, bringing David Ruffin and Eddie Kendricks into the current lineup. The reunion tour began in March 1982 a week before the album Reunion was released. The album featured mostly Edwards on several tracks and Ruffin on one. During the tour, Edwards reconnected with Ruffin, in which both men participated in cocaine binging during off-hours. According to Williams, Edwards was also arriving late or inebriated from late-night partying. The tour lasted until mid-November at the Westbury Music Fair. In 1983, the Temptations released their studio album Surface Thrills. That same year, the Temptations were memorably placed against The Four Tops in a "battle of the bands" on the television special Motown 25: Yesterday, Today, Forever, with Edwards and Four Tops frontman Levi Stubbs exchanging their respective group's hit songs. The segment was successful enough in which both acts billed a worldwide tour titled "T 'n' T" for three years.

In late 1983, Edwards walked away for the second time and was replaced by Ali-Ollie Woodson.

=== 1984–1989: Solo career, third stint with the Temptations ===
"Don't Look Any Further" by Dennis Edwards
An audio sample of "Don't Look Any Further"

In the spring of 1984, Motown re-launched Edwards's solo career, with the hit single "Don't Look Any Further", a duet with Siedah Garrett. The album of the same name reached number two on the R&B chart and included the radio singles "(You're My) Aphrodisiac" and "Just Like You". When asked of his potential second album, Edwards told the New York Daily News he had hoped to record a cover of Otis Redding's "Try a Little Tenderness" and a potential duet with Aretha Franklin. In 1985, his follow-up album Coolin' Out featured such a cover and a moderately successful title single. Shortly after, Temptations member Ron Tyson had seen Edwards performing in a Philadelphia night club, but discussions about Edwards' potential second return went nowhere.

In 1987, Woodson was fired after arriving late for shows, and Edwards was brought back once again. The Temptations recorded the album entitled Together Again, featuring the hit single "I Wonder Who She's Seeing Now". Edwards left the group for a third and final time to join Ruffin and Kendricks; he was again replaced by Woodson in 1989. That same year, Edwards was inducted into the Rock and Roll Hall of Fame as a member of The Temptations.

=== 1990–1992: Ruffin, Kendricks, and Edwards ===
Beginning in 1989, Edwards toured and recorded with Ruffin and Kendricks, billing themselves as the "Former Leads of The Temptations". David Tucker, a documentary filmmaker, profiled the group and released a MTV documentary titled Original Leads of the Temptations. Throughout 1991, all three men toured throughout Europe, with the next tour scheduled for June 26. Because they did not have a manager, Ruffin was selected to retrieve the concert proceedings from the local promoter at each venue. When the European tour was finished, Ruffin had landed in Philadelphia with a briefcase containing $40,000 in British travelers' checks. Edwards and Kendricks—who were overseas—had pleaded for Ruffin to wire transfer the checks. On June 1, 1991, Ruffin suffered an overdose at a Philadelphia crack house and was pronounced dead at a nearby hospital hours later. At the time of Ruffin's death, the briefcase had not been recovered.

Over a year later, in October 1992, Kendricks died from lung cancer in Birmingham, Alabama.

=== 1993–2017: The Temptations Review featuring Dennis Edwards ===
In 1993, Edwards recorded his third solo album Talk to Me with the Three Gems record label. The album was primarily recorded at the Strawberry Skys recording studios in Columbia, South Carolina. By this time, Edwards had moved to St. Louis, Missouri to move closer to his mother. In September 1994, he told the St. Louis Dispatch that despite not being an active member of the Temptations, he was still actively performing. That same month, the Temptations received a star on the Hollywood Walk of Fame. The surviving members, as well as relatives of Ruffin, Kendricks, and Paul Williams were in attendance at the induction ceremony and received plaques in their honor. Edwards was noticeably absent, in which he later claimed he was not informed about the honor.

As early as 1995, Edwards began touring under the name "Dennis Edwards and the Knew Temptations", prompting a legal battle between himself and Otis Williams. In November 1997, a federal judge ruled that Edwards could continue performing under their current name; Edwards' then-manager felt using "Knew" was "unique, different, and an attention getter." However, Williams appealed the ruling, in which Edwards was legally barred from using the band's name, which led Edwards's group to be called the Temptations Review featuring Dennis Edwards. Edwards's group eventually included Paul Williams Jr. (son of original Temptations member Paul Williams).

In 1998, Edwards' Don't Look Any Further: the Remix Album was released, containing updated dance mixes and the original 1984 track. For the album, he re-recorded the hit single with the Weather Girls. Also that same year, Edwards was portrayed by Charles Ley in the biographical mini-series The Temptations.

In 2013, Edwards (as a member of the Temptations) was inducted into the Rhythm and Blues Music Hall of Fame. They were also awarded a Grammy Lifetime Achievement Award. The Temptations Review was inducted into the Rhythm and Blues Music Hall of Fame on October 4, 2015.

== Personal life and death ==
Edwards was engaged to singer Aretha Franklin, who stated he was the inspiration behind her 1972 soul song "Day Dreaming". Reflecting on their relationship, Edwards later said, "Let me say it like this. I should have married Aretha. It was all in my court and I think I’m the one that was so scared of marrying this superstar." Edwards was briefly married to Ruth Pointer, whom he wed in Las Vegas on December 21, 1980, and divorced in 1983. The couple had one daughter, Issa Pointer, who became a member of her mother's vocal group, the Pointer Sisters. Edwards moved to Florissant, Missouri in the 1980s to be closer to his mother.

Edwards died in an Illinois hospital on February 1, 2018, two days before his 75th birthday. He had been battling meningitis before his death. He is interred at Jefferson Barracks National Cemetery in St. Louis County, Missouri.

== Discography ==
=== Albums ===
Year	Title	Peak chart positions		
Year	Title	US	US R&B	UK
1984	Don't Look Any Further	48	2	91
1985	Coolin' Out	–	36	–
1993	Talk to Me	–	–	–
2006	Look What the Lord Has Done	–	–	–
"–" denotes releases that did not chart.

=== Singles ===
Year	Title	Peak chart positions		
Year	Title	US	US R&B	UK
1984	"Don't Look Any Further" (with Siedah Garrett)	72	2	45
1984	"(You're My) Aphrodisiac"	–	15	–
1984	"Just Like You"	–	–	–
1985	"Amanda"	–	77	–
1985	"Coolin' Out"	–	23	–
1993	"Circle"	–	–	–
1993	"Talk to Me"	–	–	–
"–" denotes releases that did not chart.

== Bibliography ==
- Turner, Tony; Aria, Barbara (1992). Deliver Us from Temptation: The Tragic and Shocking Story of the Temptations and Motown. New York: Thunder's Mouth Press. ISBN 1-56025-0348.
- Ribowsky, Mark (2010). Ain't Too Proud to Beg: The Troubled Lives and Enduring Soul of the Temptations. Hoboken, New Jersey: John Wiley & Sons. ISBN 978-0-470-26117-0.
- Williams, Otis; Romanowski, Patricia (2002) [1988]. Temptations. Cooper Square Press. ISBN 978-0-815-41218-2.
