= Rodger Penzabene =

American songwriter (1945–1967)

- Born: November 12, 1945; Detroit, Michigan, U.S.
- Died: December 31, 1967 (age 22) Detroit, Michigan, U.S.
- Genre: Soul music
- Occupation: Lyricist
- Years active: 1966–1967
- Spouse: Helga Christensen

Rodger L. Penzabene (1945 – December 31, 1967) was an American songwriter for the Motown label. Among his most notable compositions as a lyricist are "Take Me in Your Arms and Love Me" by Gladys Knight & the Pips; "The End of Our Road" by Gladys Knight & the Pips and Marvin Gaye; and a trilogy of hits for The Temptations: "You're My Everything", "I Wish It Would Rain", and "I Could Never Love Another (After Loving You)".

Penzabene was of Sicilian American and Irish American descent. He attended Mumford High School in Detroit, Michigan. He was a childhood friend and neighbor of Cornelius Grant, with whom he wrote "You're My Everything". After Grant became musical director for the Temptations, Penzabene continued to contribute songs for the group, as well as The Isley Brothers and other Motown groups.

The mournful songs "I Wish It Would Rain" and "I Could Never Love Another" reportedly drew from Penzabene's real-life pain and suffering. Otis Williams wrote that: "We liked Roger [sic] a lot. He was young, nice-looking, but kind of quiet and reserved, and very humble. The inspiration for these great songs was his unhappy personal life."

He married Mumford High School classmate Helga Christensen. They had two sons, Rodger Jr. and Carl.

On New Year's Eve 1967, a week after the release of "I Wish It Would Rain", Penzabene committed suicide by gunshot at the age of 22.
