= Gladys Knight discography =

Cataloging of published recordings by Gladys Knight

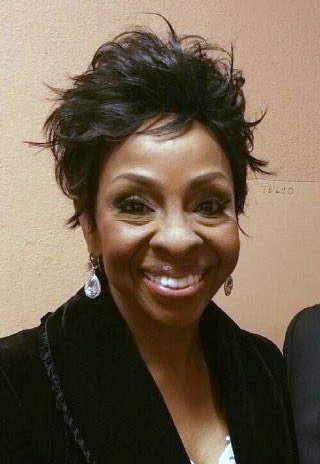
- Knight in 2016
- Studio albums: 10
- Singles: 18

The discography of American singer Gladys Knight as a solo artist consists of eleven studio albums and eighteen singles.

== Studio albums ==
Title	Album details	Peak positions				Certifications
Title	Album details	US	US R&B	US Gospel	US Jazz	Certifications
Miss Gladys Knight	Released: 1978; Label: Buddah; Formats: Cassette, CD, LP	—	57	—	—	
Gladys Knight	Released: 1979; Label: Columbia; Formats: Cassette, CD, LP	—	71	—	—	
Good Woman	Released: 1991; Label: MCA; Formats: Cassette, CD, LP	45	1	—	—	
Just for You	Released: September 13, 1994; Label: MCA; Formats: Cassette, CD	53	6	—	—	RIAA: Gold
Many Different Roads	Released: November 3, 1998; Label: Many Roads; Formats: CD, Cassette	—	—	21	—	
At Last	Released: November 21, 2000; Label: MCA; Formats: CD, Cassette, digital download	98	30	—	—	
One Voice (with Saints Unified Voices)	Released: January 4, 2005; Label: Many Roads; Formats: CD, digital download	—	95	2	—	
A Christmas Celebration	Released: October 3, 2006; Label: Many Roads; Formats: CD, digital download	155	59	4	—	
Before Me	Released: October 10, 2006; Label: Verve; Formats: CD, digital download	93	18	—	4	
Another Journey	Released: June 19, 2013; Label: Many Roads; Formats: CD, digital download	—	—	—	—	
Where My Heart Belongs	Released: September 9, 2014; Label: Shadow Mountain; Formats: CD, digital download	—	34	8	—	

== Singles ==
List of singles as lead artist, with selected chart positions, showing year released and album name
Title	Year	Peak chart positions										Certifications	Album
Title	Year	US	US R&B	US A/C	IRE	NED	NZ	NOR	SWE	SWI	UK	Certifications	Album
"I'm Coming Home Again"	1978	—	54	—	—	—	—	—	—	—	—		Miss Gladys Knight
"I'm Still Caught Up With You"	1978	—	—	—	—	—	—	—	—	—	—		Miss Gladys Knight
"Am I Too Late"	1979	—	45	—	—	—	—	—	—	—	—		Gladys Knight
"When a Child Is Born" (with Johnny Mathis)	1981	—	—	—	—	—	—	—	—	—	74		Non-album single
"That's What Friends Are For" (with Dionne Warwick, Elton John & Stevie Wonder)	1985	1	1	1	7	13	3	6	7	11	16	RMNZ: Gold	Friends
"Loving on Borrowed Time (Love Theme from Cobra)" (with Bill Medley)	1986	—	—	16	—	—	—	—	—	—	—		Cobra soundtrack
"Licence to Kill"	1989	—	69	18	4	2	—	2	1	2	6		Licence to Kill soundtrack
"If I Knew Then What I Know Now" (with Kenny Rogers)	1990	—	—	10	—	—	—	—	—	—	—		Something Inside So Strong
"Men"	1991	—	2	—	—	—	—	—	—	—	—		Good Woman
"Superwoman" (with Dionne Warwick & Patti LaBelle)^{[A]}	1991	—	19	—	—	—	—	—	—	—	—		Good Woman
"Meet Me in the Middle"	1991	—	78	—	—	—	—	—	—	—	—		Good Woman
"Where Would I Be"	1992	—	66	—	—	—	—	—	—	—	—		Good Woman
"I Don't Want to Know"	1994	—	32	—	—	—	—	—	—	—	—		Just for You
"End of the Road Medley"^{[A]}	1994	—	76	—	—	—	—	—	—	—	—		Non-album single
"Next Time"	1995	—	30	—	—	—	—	—	—	—	—		Just for You
"Missing You" (with Brandy, Tamia & Chaka Khan)	1996	25	10	30	—	—	2	—	—	—	—		Set It Off soundtrack
"If I Were Your Woman II"	2001	—	—	—	—	—	—	—	—	—	—		At Last
"I Said You Lied"	2001	—	—	—	—	—	—	—	—	—	—		At Last
"Settle"	2010	—	—	—	—	—	—	—	—	—	—		Non-album singles
"I (Who Have Nothing)"	2011	—	—	—	—	—	—	—	—	—	—		Non-album singles
"Soon"	2015	—	—	—	—	—	—	—	—	—	—		Non-album singles
"Just a Little"	2015	—	—	—	—	—	—	—	—	—	—		Non-album singles
"—" denotes the single failed to chart

Notes

- ^{A} Did not chart on the Hot R&B/Hip-Hop Songs charts (Billboard rules at the time prevented album cuts from charting). Chart peak listed represents the Hot R&B/Hip-Hop Airplay chart.

== See also ==
- Gladys Knight & the Pips discography
