= 36th Annual Grammy Awards =

1994 US music awards ceremony

- Date: March 1, 1994
- Location: Radio City Music Hall, New York, New York
- Hosted by: Garry Shandling
- Most awards: Whitney Houston (3)
- Most nominations: Whitney Houston (4)

Television/radio coverage
- Network: CBS

The 36th Annual Grammy Awards were held on March 1, 1994. They recognized accomplishments by musicians from the previous year. Whitney Houston was the Big Winner winning 3 awards including Record of the Year and Album of the Year while opening the show with "I Will Always Love You".

Audrey Hepburn's win made her the fifth person to become an EGOT, and the first person to complete the status posthumously.

Paul Simon was the first performer of the evening.

== Performers ==
Artist(s)	Song(s)
Whitney Houston	"I Will Always Love You"
Aerosmith	"Livin’ on the Edge"
Clint Black; Wynonna Judd	"A Bad Goodbye"
Billy Joel	"The River of Dreams"
Kenny G Toni Braxton	"Forever in Love" "Breathe Again"
Gloria Estefan; Tito Puente; Arturo Sandoval; Sheila E	"Mi Tierra"
Garth Brooks	"Standing Outside the Fire"
Aretha Franklin	"(You Make Me Feel Like) A Natural Woman"
Digable Planets	"Appointment at the Fat Clinic" "Rebirth of Slick (Cool Like Dat)"
Bonnie Raitt; Don Was; Bruce Springsteen; Steve Winwood; Tony! Toni! Toné! Narada Michael Walden; B.B. King	Tribute To Curtis Mayfield: “People Get Ready” ”Woman's Got Soul” ”Freddie's Dead” “Gypsy Woman” ”It's All Right”
Natalie Cole	"It's Sand, Man"
Itzhak Perlman; Pinchas Zukerman; Lynn Harrell	"IV. Presto" (from Beethoven String Trio in G major Opus. 9)
Sting	"If I Ever Lose My Faith in You"

== Presenters ==
- Bono – Grammy Legend Award to Frank Sinatra
- Danny Glover – Lifetime Achievement Award to Aretha Franklin
- SWV & Salt-N-Pepa – Best Rap Performance by a Duo or Group
- Dolly Parton & David Foster – Best Female Pop Vocal Performance
- Kenny G & Toni Braxton – Best Male Pop Vocal Performance
- Shawn Colvin, Trisha Yearwood & Mary Chapin Carpenter – Best Male Country Vocal Performance
- Meat Loaf & Vanessa Williams – Best Rock Performance by a Duo or Group with Vocals
- k.d. lang & Tony Bennett – Best Alternative Music Album
- Tevin Campbell, Jon Secada & Celine Dion – Best Tropical Latin Album
- Lee Ritenour & Oleta Adams – Best Jazz Vocal Performance
- Billy Joel – Producer of the Year
- Alan Jackson, Don Was & Jody Watley – Best New Artist
- Spin Doctors & Melissa Etheridge – Song of the Year
- B.B. King & Steve Winwood – Record of the Year
- Bonnie Raitt & Lena Horne – Album of the Year

== Award winners ==
- Record of the Year
- "I Will Always Love You" – Whitney Houston
  - David Foster, producer; Tom Elmhirst & Mark Rankin, engineers/mixers
  - Walter Afanasieff (producer) for "A Whole New World" - Peabo Bryson & Regina Belle
  - Joe Nicolo & Danny Kortchmar (producer) for "The River of Dreams" - Billy Joel
  - Sting & Hugh Padgham (producer) for "If I Ever Lose My Faith in You" - Sting
  - Neil Young (producer) for "Harvest Moon" - Neil Young
- Album of the Year
- The Bodyguard: Original Soundtrack Album – Whitney Houston
  - Houston, Babyface, BeBe Winans, David Cole, David Foster, L.A. Reid, Narada Michael Walden, Robert Clivilles, Clive Davis, producer
  - R.E.M & Scott Litt (producers) for Automatic for the People
  - Walter Becker (producer) & Donald Fagen (artist) for Kamakiriad
  - Billy Joel & Danny Kortchmar, Joe Nicolo (producers) for River of Dreams
  - Sting and Hugh Padgham (producers) for Ten Summoner's Tales
- Song of the Year
- Alan Menken & Tim Rice (songwriters) for "A Whole New World" performed by Peabo Bryson & Regina Belle
  - Billy Joel for "The River of Dreams" performed by Billy Joel
  - Jim Steinman for "I'd Do Anything for Love (But I Won't Do That)" performed by Meat Loaf
  - Sting for "If I Ever Lose My Faith in You" performed by Sting
  - Neil Young for "Harvest Moon" performed by Neil Young
- Best New Artist
  - Toni Braxton
  - Belly
  - Blind Melon
  - Digable Planets
  - SWV

=== Pop ===
- Best Pop Vocal Performance, Female
  - Whitney Houston for "I Will Always Love You"
  - Mariah Carey — "Dreamlover"
  - Shawn Colvin — "I Don't Know Why"
  - k.d. lang — "Miss Chatelaine"
  - Tina Turner — "I Don't Wanna Fight"
- Best Pop Vocal Performance, Male
  - Sting for "If I Ever Lose My Faith in You"
  - "The Crying Game" – Boy George
  - "The River of Dreams" – Billy Joel
  - "Don't Take Away My Heaven" – Aaron Neville
  - "Have I Told You Lately" – Rod Stewart
- Best Pop Performance by a Duo or Group with Vocal
  - Peabo Bryson & Regina Belle for "A Whole New World"
  - "When I Fall in Love" — Celine Dion & Clive Griffin
  - "Man on the Moon" — R.E.M.
  - "The Music of the Night" — Barbra Streisand & Michael Crawford
  - "Love Is" — Vanessa Williams & Brian McKnight
- Best Pop Instrumental Performance
  - Branford Marsalis & Bruce Hornsby for "Barcelona Mona"

=== Alternative ===
- Best Alternative Music Performance
- U2 for Zooropa
  - Belly – Star
  - Nirvana – In Utero
  - R.E.M. – Automatic for the People
  - The Smashing Pumpkins – Siamese Dream

=== Blues ===
- Best Traditional Blues Album
  - B.B. King for Blues Summit
- Best Contemporary Blues Album
  - Buddy Guy for Feels Like Rain

=== Children's ===
- Best Musical Album for Children
  - Alan Menken, Tim Rice (producers) & various artists for Aladdin - Original Motion Picture Soundtrack
- Best Spoken Word Album for Children
  - Deborah Raffin, Michael Viner (producers) & Audrey Hepburn for Audrey Hepburn's Enchanted Tales

=== Comedy ===
- From 1994 through 2003, see "Best Spoken Comedy Album" under the "Spoken" field, below.

=== Classical ===
- Best Orchestral Performance
  - Pierre Boulez (conductor)& the Chicago Symphony Orchestra for Bartók: The Wooden Prince
- Best Classical Vocal Performance
  - Arleen Auger for The Art of Arleen Auger (Works of Larsen, Purcell, Schumann, Mozart)
- Best Opera Recording
  - Steven Paul (producer), John Nelson (conductor), John Aler, Kathleen Battle, Michael Chance, Mark S. Doss, Marilyn Horne, Neil Mackie, Sylvia McNair, Samuel Ramey, the Ambrosian Opera Chorus & the English Chamber Orchestra for Handel: Semele
- Best Performance of a Choral Work
  - Pierre Boulez (conductor), Margaret Hillis (choir director) & the Chicago Symphony Orchestra & Chorus for Bartók: Cantata Profana
- Best Classical Performance-Instrumental Soloist(s) (with orchestra)
  - James Levine (conductor), Anne-Sophie Mutter & the Chicago Symphony Orchestra for Berg: Violin Concerto/Rihm: Time Chant
- Best Classical Performance-Instrumental Soloist (without orchestra)
  - John Browning for Barber: The Complete Solo Piano Music
- Best Chamber Music Performance
  - The Emerson String Quartet for Ives: String Quartets Nos. 1, 2/ Barber: String Quartet Op.11 (American Originals)
- Best Contemporary Composition
  - Elliott Carter (composer), Oliver Knussen (conductor) & the London Symphony Orchestra for Violin Concerto
- Best Classical Album
  - Karl-August Naegler (producer), Pierre Boulez (conductor), John Aler, John Tomlinson & the Chicago Symphony Orchestra & Chorus for Bartók: The Wooden Prince & Cantata Profana

=== Composing and arranging ===
- Best Instrumental Composition
  - Kenny G (composer) for "Forever in Love"
- Best Song Written Specifically for a Motion Picture or for Television
  - Alan Menken & Tim Rice (songwriters) for "A Whole New World (Aladdin's Theme)" performed by Regina Belle & Peabo Bryson
- Best Instrumental Composition Written for a Motion Picture or for Television
  - Alan Menken (composer) for Aladdin performed by various artists
- Best Arrangement on an Instrumental
  - Dave Grusin (arranger) for "Mood Indigo"
- Best Instrumental Arrangement Accompanying Vocal(s)
  - David Foster & Jeremy Lubbock (arrangers) for "When I Fall in Love" performed by Céline Dion & Clive Griffin

=== Country ===
- Best Country Vocal Performance, Female
  - Mary Chapin Carpenter for "Passionate Kisses"
- Best Country Vocal Performance, Male
  - Dwight Yoakam for "Ain't That Lonely Yet"
- Best Country Performance by a Duo or Group with Vocal
  - Brooks & Dunn for "Hard Workin' Man"
- Best Country Vocal Collaboration
  - Linda Davis & Reba McEntire for "Does He Love You"
- Best Country Instrumental Performance
  - Asleep at the Wheel, Chet Atkins, Eldon Shamblin, Johnny Gimble, Marty Stuart, Reuben "Lucky Oceans" Gosfield & Vince Gill for "Red Wing"
- Best Country Song
  - Lucinda Williams (songwriter) for "Passionate Kisses" performed by Mary Chapin Carpenter
- Best Bluegrass Album
  - The Nashville Bluegrass Band for Waitin' for the Hard Times to Go

=== Folk ===
- Best Traditional Folk Album
  - The Chieftains for The Celtic Harp: A Tribute To Edward Bunting
- Best Contemporary Folk Album
  - Nanci Griffith for Other Voices/Other Rooms

=== Gospel ===
- Best Pop/Contemporary Gospel Album
  - Steven Curtis Chapman for The Live Adventure
- Best Rock Gospel Album
  - dc Talk for Free at Last
- Best Traditional Soul Gospel Album
  - Shirley Caesar for Stand Still
- Best Contemporary Soul Gospel Album
  - The Winans for All Out
- Best Southern Gospel, Country Gospel or Bluegrass Gospel Album
  - Kathy Mattea for Good News
- Best Gospel Album by a Choir or Chorus
  - Carol Cymbala (choir director) for Live...We Come Rejoicing performed by the Brooklyn Tabernacle Choir

=== Historical ===
- Best Historical Album
  - Michael Lang & Phil Schaap (producers) for The Complete Billie Holiday on Verve 1945-1959

=== Jazz ===
- Best Jazz Instrumental Solo
  - Joe Henderson for "Miles Ahead"
- Best Jazz Instrumental Performance, Individual or Group
  - Joe Henderson for So Near, So Far (Musings for Miles)
- Best Large Jazz Ensemble Performance
  - Miles Davis & Quincy Jones for Miles & Quincy Live at Montreux
- Best Jazz Vocal Performance
  - Natalie Cole for Take a Look
- Best Contemporary Jazz Performance (Instrumental)
  - Pat Metheny Group for The Road to You

=== Latin ===
- Best Latin Pop Album
  - Luis Miguel for Aries
- Best Tropical Latin Album
  - Gloria Estefan for Mi Tierra
- Best Mexican-American Album
  - Selena for Live!

=== Musical show ===
- Best Musical Show Album
  - George Martin (producer), Pete Townshend (composer & lyricist) & the original cast for The Who's Tommy

=== Music video ===
- Best Music Video, Short Form
  - Prudence Fenton (video producer), Stephen Johnson (video director) & Peter Gabriel for "Steam"
- Best Music Video, Long Form
  - Julie Fong (video producer), Doug Nichol (video director) & Sting for Ten Summoner's Tales

=== New Age ===
- Best New Age Album
  - Paul Winter Consort for Spanish Angel

=== Packaging and notes ===
- Best Recording Package
  - David Lau (art director of The PolyGram) for The Complete Billie Holiday on Verve 1945-1959 performed by Billie Holiday
- Best Album Notes
  - Buck Clayton, Joel E. Siegel & Phil Schaap (notes writers) for The Complete Billie Holiday on Verve 1945-1959 performed by Billie Holiday

=== Polka ===
- Best Polka Album
  - Walter Ostanek for Accordionally Yours performed by Walter Ostanek & His Band

=== Production and engineering ===
- Best Engineered Album, Non-Classical
  - Hugh Padgham (engineer) for Ten Summoner's Tales performed by Sting
- Best Engineered Album, Classical
  - Rainer Maillard (engineer), Pierre Boulez (conductor) & the Chicago Symphony Orchestra & Chorus for Bartók: The Wooden Prince & Cantata Profana
- Producer of the Year
  - David Foster
- Classical Producer of the Year
  - Judith Sherman

=== R&B ===
- Best R&B Vocal Performance, Female
  - Toni Braxton for "Another Sad Love Song"
  - Aretha Franklin – "Someday We'll All Be Free"
  - Whitney Houston – "I'm Every Woman"
  - Janet Jackson – "That's The Way Love Goes"
  - Patti LaBelle – "All Right Now"
- Best R&B Vocal Performance, Male
  - Ray Charles for "A Song for You"
  - "Can We Talk" – Tevin Campbell
  - "For the Cool in You" – Babyface
  - "How Deep Is Your Love" – Luther Vandross
  - "Voodoo" – Teddy Pendergrass
- Best R&B Performance by a Duo or Group with Vocal
  - Sade for "No Ordinary Love"
  - Boyz II Men "Let It Snow"
  - Earth, Wind & Fire "Sunday Morning"
  - En Vogue "Give It Up, Turn It Loose"
  - Tony! Toni! Toné! "Anniversary"
- Best Rhythm & Blues Song
  - Janet Jackson, Jimmy Jam and Terry Lewis (songwriters) for "That's the Way Love Goes" performed by Janet Jackson
  - Babyface & Daryl Simmons (songwriters) for "Can We Talk" (Tevin Campbell)
  - Luther Vandross & Marcus Miller (songwriters) for "Little Miracles (Happen Every Day)" (Luther Vandross)
  - Luther Vandross & Reed Vertelney (songwriters) for "Heaven Knows" (Luther Vandross)
  - Raphael Wiggins & Carl Wheeler (songwriters) for "Anniversary" (Tony! Toni! Toné!)

=== Rap ===
- Best Rap Solo Performance
  - Dr. Dre for "Let Me Ride"
  - Paperboy – "Ditty"
  - Sir Mix-a-Lot – "Just Da Pimpin' In Me"
  - MC Lyte – "Ruffneck"
  - LL Cool J – "Stand by Your Man"
- Best Rap Performance by a Duo or Group
  - Digable Planets for "Rebirth of Slick (Cool Like Dat)"
  - Arrested Development — "Revolution"
  - Cypress Hill — "Insane in the Brain"
  - Dr. Dre & Snoop Dogg — "Nuthin' but a 'G' Thang"
  - Naughty by Nature — "Hip Hop Hooray"

=== Reggae ===
- Best Reggae Album
  - Inner Circle for Bad Boys

=== Rock ===
- Best Rock Vocal Performance, Solo
  - Meat Loaf for "I'd Do Anything for Love (But I Won't Do That)"
  - Neil Young – "All Along the Watchtower"
  - Lenny Kravitz – "Are You Gonna Go My Way"
  - Sting – "Demolition Man"
  - Peter Gabriel – "Steam"
- Best Rock Performance by a Duo or Group with Vocal
  - Aerosmith for "Livin' on the Edge"
  - Blind Melon – "No Rain"
  - Bob Dylan, Roger McGuinn, Tom Petty, Neil Young, Eric Clapton and George Harrison– "My Back Pages"
  - Soul Asylum – "Runaway Train"
  - Spin Doctors – "Two Princes"
- Best Rock Instrumental Performance
  - Steve Vai for "Sofa"
  - Aerosmith – "Boogie Man"
  - Jeff Beck and Jed Leiber – "Hi-Heel Sneakers"
  - Joe Satriani – "Speed of Light"
  - Tangerine Dream – "Purple Haze
- Best Hard Rock Performance with Vocal
  - Stone Temple Pilots for "Plush"
  - AC/DC – "Highway to Hell" (live)
  - Living Colour – "Leave It Alone"
  - Robert Plant – "Calling to You"
  - The Smashing Pumpkins – "Cherub Rock"
- Best Metal Performance with Vocal
  - Ozzy Osbourne for "I Don't Want to Change the World"
  - Iron Maiden – "Fear of the Dark" (live)
  - Megadeth – "Angry Again"
  - Suicidal Tendencies – "Institutionalized"
  - White Zombie – "Thunder Kiss '65"
- Best Rock Song
  - David Pirner (songwriter) for "Runaway Train" performed by Soul Asylum

=== Spoken ===
- Best Spoken Word or Non-musical Album
  - Maya Angelou for On the Pulse of Morning
- Best Spoken Comedy Album
  - George Carlin for Jammin' in New York

=== Traditional pop ===
- Best Traditional Pop Vocal Performance
  - Tony Bennett for Steppin' Out

=== World ===
- Best World Music Album
  - V. M. Bhatt & Ry Cooder for A Meeting by the River

== Special merit awards ==
=== Grammy Legend Award ===
- Curtis Mayfield
- Frank Sinatra

=== MusiCares Person of the Year ===
- Gloria Estefan
