= A Christmas Celebration (Gladys Knight album) =

Studio album by Gladys Knight
- Released: October 3, 2006
- Length: 49:19
- Label: Many Roads

Gladys Knight chronology
One Voice (2005)	A Christmas Celebration (2006)	Before Me (2006)

A Christmas Celebration is a studio album by American singer Gladys Knight along with the Saints Unified Voices music choir. It was released by Many Roads Records on October 3, 2006 in the United States.

== Critical reception ==
Allmusic editor Alex Henderson found that "Knight presents a warm, welcoming set of Yuletide songs on 2006's A Christmas Celebration. A showcase for the choir Saints Unified Voices (an ensemble assembled and directed by Knight), A Christmas Celebration finds the group backed by light, Quiet Storm-style arrangements on serene versions of both secular and religious classics."

== Track listing ==
No.	Title	Length
1.	"Introduction"/"Opening"	4:24
2.	"Breath of Heaven"	5:47
3.	"Silent Night"/"O Holy Night"	4:28
4.	"I Wonder As I Wander"	4:14
5.	"We Three Kings"	3:00
6.	"Little Drummer Boy"	3:38
7.	"Oh, Come, All Ye Faithful"	5:23
8.	"Jesus, Oh What a Wonderful Child"	4:36
9.	"The Christmas Song (Chestnuts Roasting on an Open Fire)"	3:56
10.	"White Christmas"	3:13
11.	"Winter Wonderland"/"Jingle Bells"	3:22
12.	"The Lord's Prayer"	3:18

== Charts ==
Chart (2006)	Peak position
US Billboard 200	155
US Independent Albums (Billboard)	7
US Top Gospel Albums (Billboard)	4
US Top Holiday Albums (Billboard)	22
US Top R&B/Hip-Hop Albums (Billboard)	59

== Release history ==
Region	Date	Format	Label	Ref.
Various	October 3, 2006	CD; digital download	Many Roads Records	
