= If I Knew Then =

If I Knew Then may refer to:

- "If I Knew Then (Dick Jurgens and Eddy Howard song)", a song written by Dick Jurgens and Eddy Howard and covered by many artists including Johnny Mercer, Sammy Kaye, the Delta Rhythm Boys, Sarah Vaughan on Sarah Vaughan with Clifford Brown and Swingin' Easy
- "If I Knew Then", by Dean Martin, composed by J. William (Billy) VerPlanck (1930–2009)
- "If I Knew Then", song by Lyfe Jennings from his I Still Believe (album)
- "If I Knew Then", song by Cher from her 1972 album Foxy Lady (Cher album)
- "If I Knew Then", single by Randy Gill
- "If I Knew Then", song by II D Extreme from album From I Extreme II Another 1966
- "If I Knew Then", song by Lady Antebellum from her 2010 album Need You Now (Lady Antebellum album)
- "If I Knew Then", a song by Ray Conniff from Happiness Is (Ray Conniff album)
- "If I Knew Then", a song by Backstreet Boys from This Is Us (Backstreet Boys album)
- "If I Knew Then What I Know Now", Kenny Rogers discography with Gladys Knight 1990
