= One Voice (Gladys Knight album) =

Studio album by Gladys Knight
- Released: January 4, 2005
- Genre: Gospel
- Length: 48:47
- Label: Many Roads

Gladys Knight chronology
At Last (2000)	One Voice (2005)	A Christmas Celebration (2006)

One Voice is a studio album by American singer Gladys Knight along with the Saints Unified Voices music choir. It was released by Many Roads Records on January 4, 2005 in the United States. At the 48th Annual Grammy Awards, the album became the last recipient of the Grammy Award for Best Gospel Choir or Chorus Album.

== Track listing ==
No.	Title	Length
1.	"One Voice"	1:27
2.	"Over My Head"	0:45
3.	"Come, Come, Ye Saints"	2:07
4.	"Love One Another"	4:18
5.	"Pass Me Not"	4:18
6.	"Right Here Waiting"	4:18
7.	"Prayer"	0:44
8.	"Did You Know"	5:08
9.	"I Am a Child of God"	3:29
10.	"Jesu Me Kanaka Waiwai"	3:39
11.	"Blessed Assurance"	3:55
12.	"He Shines On Me"	1:40
13.	"Uphold Me"	4:03
14.	"He's Worthy"	4:13
15.	"He Lives"	4:30

== Charts ==
Chart (2005)	Peak position
US Independent Albums (Billboard)	21
US Top Gospel Albums (Billboard)	2
US Top R&B/Hip-Hop Albums (Billboard)	95

== Release history ==
Region	Date	Format	Label	Ref.
Various	January 4, 2005	CD; digital download	Many Roads Records	
