= I Got It Bad (and That Ain't Good) =

1941 show tune by Duke Ellington

"I Got It Bad (and That Ain't Good)" is a pop and jazz standard with music by Duke Ellington and lyrics by Paul Francis Webster published in 1941. It was introduced in the musical revue Jump for Joy by Ivie Anderson, who also provided the vocals for Duke Ellington and His Orchestra on the single Victor 27531. Recordings to reach the Billboard charts in 1941 and 1942 were by Duke Ellington (#13) and by Benny Goodman (vocal by Peggy Lee) (#25).

== Recorded versions by notable artists ==
- Al Aarons
- John "Johnny" Adriano Acea
- Cannonball Adderley
- Jamey Aebersold
- Harry Allen
- Carl Anderson
- Ernestine Anderson
- Ivie Anderson
- Susie Arioli
- Louis Armstrong
- Benny Bailey
- Guy Barker
- Bruce Barth
- Count Basie
- BBC Big Band
- Tobias Beecher
- Madeline Bell
- Joe Benjamin
- Tony Bennett
- Big Miller
- Paul Bley
- Carolyn Breuer
- Marvin Gaye
- Charles Brown
- Sandy Brown
- Beryl Bryden
- Kenny Burrell
- Charlie Byrd
- Donald Byrd
- Ann Hampton Callaway
- Harry Carney
- Benny Carter
- Cher - Bittersweet White Light (1973)
- June Christy
- Rosemary Clooney
- Nat King Cole
- John Coltrane
- Doris Day with Les Brown and his orchestra
- Yvonne De Carlo
- Buddy DeFranco
- Bill Evans
- Eileen Farrell
- Ella Fitzgerald
- Sara Gazarek - Live at the Jazz Bakery (2006)
- Red Garland
- Benny Goodman
- Earl Grant
- Roy Hamilton
- Earl Hines - An Evening with Earl Hines (Chiaroscuro, 1977)
- Johnny Hodges
- Billie Holiday
- Shirley Horn
- Lena Horne
- Phyllis Hyman
- Joe Jackson
- Ahmad Jamal
- Etta James
- Keith Jarrett
- Molly Johnson
- Stacey Kent - The Boy Next Door (2003)
- Stan Kenton - Rendezvous of Standards and Classics (1995)
- Gladys Knight - Before Me (2006)
- Dayna Kurtz
- Peggy Lee
- Chuck Loeb
- Julie London - The Ultimate Collection (2005)
- Margaret
- Millicent Martin
- Jane Monheit
- Thelonious Monk
- Vaughn Monroe
- The Oscar Peterson Trio
- Lou Rawls
- Della Reese
- Dianne Reeves - Dianne Reeves (1987)
- Carly Simon
- Nina Simone
- Frank Sinatra - A Swingin' Affair! (1957)
- Jo Stafford
- Donna Summer
- Toni Tennille (1984)
- McCoy Tyner
- US Navy Band Commodores Jazz Ensemble
- Dinah Washington
- Weather Report
- Ben Webster
- Jackie Wilson
