= Grammy Award for Best Gospel Choir or Chorus Album =

Music award category

The Grammy Award for Best Gospel Choir or Chorus Album was awarded from 1991 to 2006. From 1991 to 1997 it was awarded as Best Gospel Album by a Choir or Chorus. The Brooklyn Tabernacle Choir and their director, Carol Cymbala, were the most decorated artist in this category with six wins.

Years reflect the year in which the Grammy Awards were presented, for works released in the previous year.

== Recipients ==
Years reflect the year in which the Grammy Awards were presented, for works released in the previous year.

Year^{[I]}	Choir director(s)	Performing artist(s)	Work	Nominees	Ref.
1991	James Cleveland	Southern California Community Choir	Having Church	?	
1992	Gary Hines	Sounds of Blackness	The Evolution of Gospel	O'landa Draper& the Associates – Above and Beyond; Music and Arts Seminar Chicago Mass Choir – Edwin Hawkins Music and Arts Seminar Chicago Mass Choir; Christ Church Choir – Hand in Hand; Brooklyn Tabernacle Singers – Jesus Be Praised; L.A. Gospel Messengers – Rev. James Cleveland and the L.A. Gospel Messengers	
1993	Edwin Hawkins	Music & Arts Seminar Mass Choir	Edwin Hawkins Music & Arts Seminar Mass Choir – Recorded Live in Los Angeles	?	
1994	Carol Cymbala	Brooklyn Tabernacle Choir	Live...We Come Rejoicing	?	
1995	Milton Brunson	Thompson Community Singers	Through God's Eyes	O'landa Draper & The Associates – Live...A Celebration of Praise; Edwin Hawkins Music & Arts Seminar Mass Choir – Kings & Kingdoms; Kurt Carr and the Los Angeles Gospel Messengers – We Haven't Forgotten You; Hezekiah Walker and the Love Fellowship Crusade Choir – Live in Atlanta at Morehouse College	
1996	Carol Cymbala	Brooklyn Tabernacle Choir	Praise Him - Live!	Donald Lawrence & the Tri-City Singers – Bible Stories; Hezekiah Walker & the Love Fellowship Crusade Choir – Live in New York by Any Means...; Rev. Milton Brunson and the Thompson Community Singers – Shout; New Life Community Choir featuring John P. Kee – Show Up!	
1997	Shirley Caesar	Shirley Caesar's Outreach Convention Choir	Just A Word	Edwin Hawkins Music & Arts Seminar – All Things Are Possible; Olanda Draper and the Associates – Gotta Feelin'; Mississippi Mass Choir – I'll See You in the Rapture; Shirley Caesar's Outreach Convention Choir – Just a Word; Full Gospel Baptist Fellowship Mass Choir – A New Thing...Experience the Fullness	
1998	Kirk Franklin; Myron Butler; Robert Searight II	God's Property	God's Property from Kirk Franklin's Nu Nation	Brooklyn Tabernacle Choir – Favorite Song of All; Rev. Milton Brunson's Thompson Community Singers – He's Still Good!; Hezekiah Walker and Love Fellowship Crusade Choir – Live in London at Wembley; Sounds of Blackness – Time for Healing	
1999	O'landa Draper	The Associates	Reflections	Bobby Jones and New Life With the Nashville Super Choir – Just Churchin'; The Love Center Choir – Love Alive V--25th Anniversary Reunion; Hezekiah Walker and the LFT Church Choir – Live at Love Fellowship Tabernacle; New Life Community Choir – Strength	
2000	Carol Cymbala	Brooklyn Tabernacle Choir	High And Lifted Up	VIP Music & Arts Seminar Mass Choir – Any Day; Mississippi Mass Choir – Emmanuel (God With Us); Wilmington Chester Mass Choir – Hosanna! And They Sang The Word; Inner City Mass Choir – Let's Make It Better	
2001	Carol Cymbala	Brooklyn Tabernacle Choir	Live - God Is Working	New Direction – Get Your Praise On; Youth For Christ – Higher; University of Mississippi Gospel Choir – Send Up The Praise; The Tri-City Singers – tri-city4.com	
2002	Hezekiah Walker	LFT Church Choir	Love Is Live!	O'landa Draper's Associates – All About Him (Jesus); Chicago Mass Choir – Calling On You; Brooklyn Tabernacle Choir – Light Of The World; T. D. Jakes and the Potter's House Mass Choir – The Storm Is Over Now	
2003	Carol Cymbala	Brooklyn Tabernacle Choir	Be Glad	VIP Mass Choir – Mighty In The Spirit; Donald Lawrence & The Tri-City Singers – Go Get Your Live Back; Hezekiah Walker and Love Fellowship Choir – Family Affair II - Live at Radio City Music Hall; Excelsior – Soul Interpretations	
2004	T. D. Jakes	Potter's House Mass Choir	A Wing And A Prayer	John P. Kee & The New Life Community Choir – Blessed By Association; CeCe Winans Presents The Born Again Church Choir – Born Again Choir; Chicago Mass Choir – Live In Nashville; Joe Pace and the Colorado Mass Choir – Speak Life	
2005	Carol Cymbala	Brooklyn Tabernacle Choir	Live...This is Your House	Minister Timothy Britten & Shabach Praise Co. – Can't Nobody Do Me Like Jesus; Timothy Wright & New York Fellowship Mass Choir II – Live In New York; New Birth Total Praise Choir – Spirit & Truth; Ricky Dillard & New G – Unplugged...The Way Church Used To Be	
2006	Gladys Knight	Saints Unified Voices	One Voice	Donald Lawrence & Company – I Speak Life; VIP Mass Choir – Live at The Fellowship; Kurt Carr – One Church; Hezekiah Walker and The Love Fellowship Choir – 20/85 The Experience	

^{^[I]} Each year is linked to the article about the Grammy Awards held that year.

== See also ==
- List of Grammy Award categories
