= A Christmas Celebration =

A Christmas Celebration may refer to:

- A Christmas Celebration (Celtic Woman album)
- A Christmas Celebration (Gladys Knight album)

== See also ==
- Christmas Celebration, an album by Mannheim Steamroller
