= Jim Cymbala =

Author, pastor (b. 1943)

- Born: May 4, 1943 (age 83); Brooklyn, New York, U.S.
- Education: University of Rhode Island; United States Naval Academy
- Occupations: Pastor, author
- Years active: 1971–present
- Spouse: Carol Cymbala

James R. Cymbala (born May 4th, 1943) is an American author and pastor of the Brooklyn Tabernacle. He is also a former college basketball player for the United States Naval Academy and the University of Rhode Island.

Cymbala's best-selling books include Fresh Wind, Fresh Fire; Fresh Faith; and Fresh Power. In 2002, Cymbala was nominated for a Dove Award for Musical of the Year, for his work on Light Of The World, along with his wife, Carol Cymbala and their 270-voice Brooklyn Tabernacle Choir. He has been the pastor of Brooklyn Tabernacle since 1971. When he began, the church membership numbered fewer than 30 persons. As of 2012, the church numbers were over 16,000 members.

== Published works ==
- Fresh Wind, Fresh Fire: What Happens When God's Spirit Invades the Hearts of His People, Zondervan, 1997. ISBN 978-0310214168
- Fresh Faith: What Happens When Real Faith Ignites God's People, Zondervan, 1999. ISBN 978-0310231899
- The Life God Blesses: The Secret of Enjoying God's Favor, Zondervan, 2001. ISBN 978-0310242024
- God's Grace from Ground Zero: Seeking God's Heart for the Future of Our World, Zondervan, 2001. ISBN 978-0310236627
- The Church God Blesses, Zondervan, 2002. ISBN 978-0310242031
- Fresh Power: What Happens When God Leads and You Follow, Zondervan, 2003. ISBN 978-0310251545
- Breakthrough Prayer: The Power of Connecting with the Heart of God, Zondervan, 2003. ISBN 978-0310255185
- Fresh Faith: What Happens When Real Faith Ignites God's People, Zondervan, 2003. ISBN 978-0310251552
- The Promise of God’s Power, Running Press Miniature Editions, 2003. ISBN 978-0762416820
- The Promise of Answered Prayer, Inspirio, 2003. ISBN 978-0310989059
- Living Abundantly Through God's Blessing, Inspirio, 2004. ISBN 978-0310989035
- When God's People Pray Participant's Guide: Six Sessions on the Transforming Power of Prayer, Zondervan, 2007. ISBN 978-0310267348
- You Were Made for More: The Life You Have, the Life God Wants You to Have, Zondervan, 2008. ISBN 978-0310241270
- Spirit Rising: Tapping into the Power of the Holy Spirit, Zondervan, 2012. ISBN 978-0310241256
