= Music and Friends (Walter Ostanek album) =

Studio album by Walter Ostanek Band
- Released: 1994
- Genre: Polka
- Label: World Renowned Sounds

Music and Friends is an album by the Walter Ostanek Band. In 1995, the album won Ostanek the Grammy Award for Best Polka Album.
