= 35th Anniversary =

Studio album by Walter Ostanek and His Band
- Released: 1992
- Genre: Polka

35th Anniversary is an album by Walter Ostanek and His Band, released in 1992. In 1993, the album won Ostanek the Grammy Award for Best Polka Album.

== Track listing ==
No.	Title	Length
1.	"The Old Time Band Polka"
2.	"Three Little Wishes Waltz"
3.	"Sandra's Polka"
4.	"Sweethearts Polka"
5.	"Tomsick's Waltz"
6.	"So Many Times Polka"
7.	"CB's Polka"
8.	"Polka Nova Polka"
9.	"Platt's Polka"
10.	"Come Away With Me Waltz"
11.	"Roseann Polka"
12.	"CJ's Polka"
13.	"Dance With Me This Polka"
14.	"I Lied To You Polka"
15.	"Say Thank You Dear & Give Her Roses Waltz"
16.	"Because Polka"
17.	"Zivila Braca Ziveli Sestre (Long Live Our Brothers & Sisters)"
18.	"Polkarina Polka"
19.	"Don't Wait Until Tomorrow"
20.	"Oh How I Miss You Tonight Polka"
21.	"Hayride Polka"
22.	"Dreaming Waltz"
23.	"Laronda Polka"
