= Licence to Kill (soundtrack) =

Soundtrack album by Michael Kamen
- Released: 1989
- Recorded: 1989
- Label: MCA Records
- Producer: Joel Sill

Michael Kamen chronology
Renegades (1989)	Licence to Kill (1989)	Lethal Weapon 2 (1989)

Singles from Licence to Kill
- 1. "Licence to Kill" Released: 30 May 1989; 2. "If You Asked Me To" Released: 12 June 1989

The soundtrack to Licence to Kill, the 16th Eon Productions James Bond film, was released by MCA Records in 1989.

Because the usual James Bond composer John Barry (who had scored almost every film from From Russia with Love onwards) was not available at the time as he was undergoing throat surgery after suffering a rupture of the esophagus in 1988, the soundtrack's more upbeat and suspenseful score was composed and conducted by Michael Kamen.

Initially Eric Clapton and Vic Flick were asked to write and perform the theme song to Licence to Kill. The theme was said to have been a new version based on the "James Bond Theme". The guitar riff heard in the original recording of the theme was played by Flick. A track purporting to be the unused Clapton/Flick theme was uploaded to the music sharing website SoundCloud in January 2022 and was later confirmed to be genuine.

The prospect, however, fell apart and Gladys Knight's song and performance of the theme "Licence to Kill" was chosen, later becoming a Top 10 hit on the UK Singles Chart. The song was composed by Narada Michael Walden, Jeffrey Cohen and Walter Afanasieff, based on the "horn line" from Shirley Bassey's prior Bond theme "Goldfinger" from the 1964 film of the same name, which required royalty payments to the original writers John Barry, Leslie Bricusse and Anthony Newley. At 5 minutes 13 seconds it is the longest Bond theme, though 45 single releases featured a shorter edit, running 4 minutes 11 seconds. The version used in the movie itself was edited to 2 minutes 53 seconds. Uniquely, the credits for the song (writers and performer) are not included in the opening titles. The music video of "Licence to Kill" was directed by Daniel Kleinman, who later took over the reins of title designer from Maurice Binder for the 1995 Bond film, GoldenEye.

All the instrumental tracks are amalgams of various sequences and musical cues from the film rather than straight score excerpts. The end credits of the film feature the song "If You Asked Me To" sung by Patti LaBelle. Though the song was a top ten hit on the US Billboard R&B charts and a minor pop hit on the Billboard Hot 100 for LaBelle, in 1992, the song was covered by and became a much bigger hit for singer Céline Dion. The track "Wedding Party" by Ivory, used during the wedding of Felix Leiter (David Hedison) to Della Churchill (Priscilla Barnes), makes reference to the Byron Lee and the Dragonaires track "Jump Up" from the first Bond film, Dr. No.

In January 2025, La-La Land Records released a remastered and expanded edition of the score, commemorating the film's 35th anniversary.

== Track listing ==
=== 1989 Original Release ===
1. "Licence to Kill" – Gladys Knight
2. "Wedding Party" – Ivory
3. "Dirty Love" – Tim Feehan
4. "Pam"
5. "If You Asked Me To" – Patti LaBelle
6. "James & Felix on Their Way to Church" (Note: contains the "James Bond Theme", originally composed for the Dr. No soundtrack)
7. "His Funny Valentine"
8. "Sanchez is in the Bahamas/Shark Fishing"
9. "Ninja"
10. "Licence Revoked"

=== 2025 Expanded Release ===
==== Disc 1 ====
1. "Gun Barrel / Cray Cay Landing"
2. "His Funny Valentine (Film Version)"
3. "Sanchez is in the Bahamas / Shark Fishing (Extended Version)"
4. "Bond Hooks Sanchez"
5. "James & Felix on Their Way to Church (Film Version)"
6. "Licence To Kill" (Performed by Gladys Knight)
7. "Sanchez Escapes"
8. "Della’s Goodbye"
9. "Torturing Felix"
10. "He Disagreed with Something That Ate Him"
11. "Let’s Go Shark Hunting"
12. "Ocean Exotica Break-In"
13. "You Earned It"
14. "Hemingway House"
15. "Licence Revoked (Film Version)"
16. "Bond Aboard* / Sharkey Dead"
17. "Seaplane Escape"
18. "Pam (Film Version)"
19. "Enter Ms. Kennedy / Enter Lupe / Sanchez’s Office"
20. "Uncle Q / Let’s Get Some Rest"
21. "Planting the Explosives"
22. "Kwang / Assassination Attempt"
23. "Ninja (Film Version)"
24. "Sanchez’s Home"
25. "Bond Sneaks Out"
26. "Bond Confronts Pam"
27. "Framing Krest"
28. "Leaving Harbour"
29. "Bond and Lupe"
30. "Q in Disguise"

==== Disc 2 ====
1. "The Lab* / The Process"
2. "The Conveyor Belt"
3. "Dario Sees Pam / Chewed Up"
4. "Escape from the Compound"
5. "Tanker Downhill"
6. "Truck Chase"
7. "Problem Eliminated / Get In"
8. "Pam and Bond"
9. "Bridal Chorus"
10. "Für Elise"
11. "Olimpatec Meditation Institute"
12. "Casino Source I"
13. "Casino Source II"
14. "Party Version I"
15. "Party Piano"
16. "Pam (Wild Guitar Excerpt)"

Tracks 17-26 are the same as the 1989 Release.

== See also ==
- Outline of James Bond
