= Where My Heart Belongs =

Studio album by Gladys Knight
- Released: September 9, 2014
- Length: 41:56
- Label: Shadow Mountain

Gladys Knight chronology
Another Journey (2013)	Where My Heart Belongs (2014)

Where My Heart Belongs is a studio album by American singer Gladys Knight. It was released by Shadow Mountain Records on September 9, 2014 in the United States.

== Track listing ==
No.	Title	Length
1.	"Need You Love You"	4:45
2.	"Always"	4:40
3.	"Just Look Up"	4:02
4.	"Life"	5:22
5.	"Immersed"	3:50
6.	"Midst of the Rain"	3:52
7.	"Champions"	4:29
8.	"There Is a Green Hill Far Away"	2:07
9.	"Were You There"	3:37
10.	"Happy Birthday Jesus"/"Sweet Little Jesus Boy"	5:12

== Charts ==
Chart (2014)	Peak position
US Top Gospel Albums (Billboard)	8
US Top R&B/Hip-Hop Albums (Billboard)	34

== Release history ==
Region	Date	Format	Label	Ref.
Various	September 9, 2014	CD; digital download	Shadow Mountain Records	
