= Many Different Roads =

Studio album by Gladys Knight
- Released: November 3, 1998
- Genre: Gospel
- Length: 52:16
- Label: Many Roads

Gladys Knight chronology
Just for You (1994)	Many Different Roads (1998)	At Last (2000)

Many Different Roads is the fifth studio album by American singer Gladys Knight. It was released by Many Roads Records on November 3, 1998 in the United States. The album was nominated for the Grammy Award for Best Contemporary R&B Gospel Album at the 42nd awards ceremony.

== Critical reception ==
Professional ratings
Review scores
Source	Rating
Allmusic	4/5 stars

Allmusic editor Dacia A. Blodgett-Williams wrote that "as one would expect from a seasoned artist like Knight, the entire album is musically sound from a critic's standpoint, and the messages of the lyrics leave an indelible impression on the listener [...] The music on this album cannot be neatly confined to any one genre. It has a little bit of soul, a bit of rock, and a bit of gospel. And the result is an album that has a huge amount of appeal for not only her longtime fans, but for the new audience she attracted in 1997 when she joined the Church of Jesus Christ of Latter-day Saints. It's representative of a new focus at that time of her life, but is not representative of her entire body of work."

== Track listing ==
No.	Title	Length
1.	"Mercy's Arms"	4:27
2.	"Open Up Your Eyes"	4:02
3.	"Precious Lord"	5:48
4.	"Everybody"	4:36
5.	"Mr. Love"	3:47
6.	"What Would I Do Without You (Interlude)"	2:04
7.	"He Never Will"	4:13
8.	"Jesus' Love Is Like a River"	4:41
9.	"Good Morning Heavenly Father"	3:53
10.	"Many Different Roads"	5:03
11.	"With a Smile"	3:50
12.	"Saints Madley" ("Just a Little Talk With Jesus"/"By and By"/"When the Saints Go Marching In")	3:53
13.	"Worship You (Interlude)"	1:59

== Charts ==
Chart (1998)	Peak position
US Top Gospel Albums (Billboard)	21

== Release history ==
Region	Date	Format	Label	Ref.
Various	November 3, 1998	CD; cassette	Many Roads Records	
