= Miss Gladys Knight =

Studio album by Gladys Knight
- Released: 1978
- Label: Buddah
- Producer: Gary Klein; Tony Macaulay

Gladys Knight chronology
Miss Gladys Knight (1978)	Gladys Knight (1979)

Miss Gladys Knight is the debut solo album by American singer Gladys Knight. It was released by Buddah Records in 1978 in the United States. Her only album with that label, it peaked at number 57 on the US Top R&B/Hip-Hop Albums chart.

== Critical reception ==
Professional ratings
Review scores
Source	Rating
Allmusic	3/5 stars

Allmusic editor Alex Henderson wrote that Miss Gladys Knight "usually finds the singer walking a fine line between R&B and adult contemporary [...] Although pleasant and decent, Miss Gladys Knight isn't a masterpiece and isn't among her essential recordings. This album is only recommended to collectors [...]."

== Track listing ==
Side one
No.	Title	Writer(s)	Producer(s)	Length
1.	"I'm Coming Home Again"	Bruce Roberts; Carole Bayer Sager	Gary Klein	4:18
2.	"Sail Away"/"Freedom for the Stallions"	Allen Toussaint; Randy Newman	Klein	4:30
3.	"I'm Still Caught Up With You"	Tony Macaulay	Macaulay	3:54
4.	"It's a Better Than Good Time (Disco)"	Macaulay	Macaulay	5:54

Side two
No.	Title	Writer(s)	Producer(s)	Length
1.	"We Don't Make Each Other Laugh Anymore"	Macaulay	Macaulay	4:26
2.	"The Way It Was"	Barry Gibb; Blue Weaver; Robin Gibb	Klein	3:22
3.	"I'll Take a Melody"	Toussaint	Klein	3:40
4.	"With You in Mind"	Toussaint	Klein	3:51
5.	"Love Gives You the Power"	Ben Weisman; Evie Sands; Richard Germinaro	Klein	3:58

== Charts ==
Chart (1978)	Peak position
US Top R&B/Hip-Hop Albums (Billboard)	57

== Release history ==
Region	Date	Format	Label	Ref.
Various	1978	Vinyl; cassette	Buddah Records	
