= Walter Ostanek =

Canadian polka musician (born 1935)

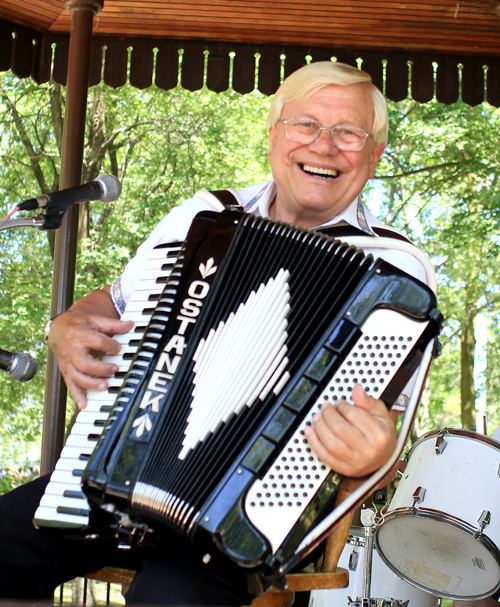
- Ostanek performing at Marineland in July 2011

Background information
- Born: Ladislav John Ostanek; 20 April 1935 (age 91); Duparquet, Quebec, Canada
- Origin: St. Catharines, Ontario, Canada
- Genre: Polka
- Occupations: Musician, songwriter
- Instrument: Accordion
- Years active: Since 1957

Ladislav John "Walter" Ostanek, CM (born 20 April 1935) is a Canadian musician. He is known as "Canada's Polka King". He has received thirteen nominations for Grammy Awards and won three.

== Early life ==
Born in Duparquet, Quebec, in 1935, his family moved to St. Catharines, Ontario, when he was a boy. A young Ostanek received his first accordion as a gift in 1944. After several years, Ostanek became a popular entertainer in Southern Ontario, performing Slovenian-style (also known as Cleveland-style) polkas and waltzes. He could be heard frequently on the radio in St. Catharines and Welland. Walter began playing polka after his best friend introduced him to the accordion at age 5.

== Career ==
In 1957 Ostanek formed his own band playing Slovenian-style polka music. In 1963, Ostanek and his band, the Walter Ostanek Band, recorded their first of many albums. Over his career, Ostanek has recorded more than 50 albums and become known as Canada's Polka King (shared with Gaby Haas). He has received three Grammy Awards and he has been nominated thirteen times. His style has been compared to America's Polka King, Frankie Yankovic of Cleveland. Like Yankovic, Walter Ostanek is of Slovene descent.

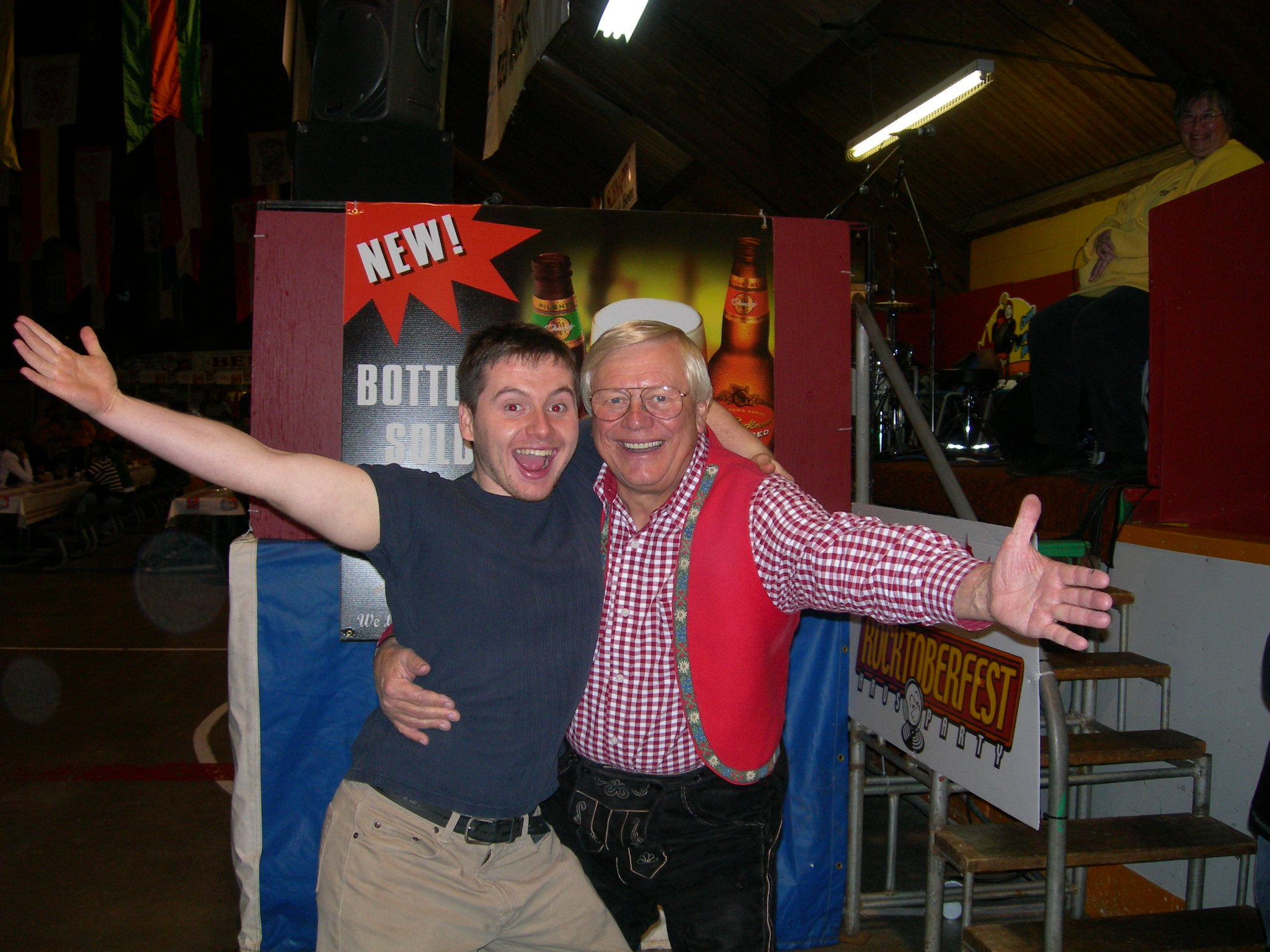
Ostanek (right) appearing at the 2006 Kitchener-Waterloo Oktoberfest

Ostanek hosted his own television shows (one for fourteen consecutive years), radio shows, and polka tours. He has appeared on The Tonight Show Starring Johnny Carson, Phil Donahue, Tommy Hunter Show, Cleveland's Polka Varieties, and his own award-winning TV specials and telethons. He has appeared in concert with Roy Clark, The Oak Ridge Boys, Ronnie Milsap, Ray Price, Mel Tillis, Brenda Lee, Slim Whitman, Tom T. Hall, T. G. Sheppard, Tommy Hunter, Lawrence Welk, Myron Floren, Frank Yankovic, Black Forest Band, and Weiss Blau.

Ostanek is a member of Canada's Walk of Fame as well as the Polka Halls of Fame in Cleveland and Chicago. Currently Ostanek performs once a year at the annual Oktoberfest in Kitchener, Ontario.

He is also the subject of the 2006 Bravo! network documentary The Cult of Walt: Canada's Polka King. Ostanek is also cited as the inspiration for the Second City Television polka parody, the Shmenge Brothers, and the Osler show.

In 2007, Ostanek was the recipient of the Lifetime Achievement Award at the annual SOCAN Awards in Toronto.

Ostanek currently resides in St. Catharines, Ontario. He was the owner of the popular music store "Ostanek's" until 1 April 2013, when the store was converted to a Long & McQuade. He still plays locally, playing at the Kitchener Oktoberfest in 2026.

== Lottery ==
In July 2016 Ostanek was in the news when he won a million dollars in the London Dream Lottery, which raises money for hospitals.

== Awards and recognition ==
- 1992, 1993, 1994: winner, Grammy Award for Best Polka Album
- 1999: appointed Member of the Order of Canada
- 2001: inductee, Canada's Walk of Fame
- 2007: SOCAN Lifetime Achievement Award

== Discography ==
=== Singles ===
- c. 1962 "Walter Ostan" Marianne
- 1998 "Larhonda Polka" Here Come the Polka Heroes

=== Walter Ostanek Band ===
- The Walter Ostanek Band

=== Walter Ostanek and His Band ===
- Gay Continental Dance Party (1965)
- 35th Anniversary
- Accordionally Yours

108 albums in total

=== Walter Ostanek and His Polka Band ===
- I Like Frankie Yankovic

=== Walter Ostanek and His Polka Kings ===
- Polka Party

=== Walter Ostanek ===
- Music and Friends
- Marineland Favourites
- Like Father, Like Son
- 1995 Polka Monster (EP)

=== Walter Ostanek and his Orchestra ===
- Centennial Dance Party
