= Gladys Knight (album) =

Studio album by Gladys Knight
- Released: 1979
- Length: 38:42
- Label: Columbia
- Producer: Jack Gold

Gladys Knight chronology
Miss Gladys Knight (1978)	Gladys Knight (1979)	Good Woman (1991)

Gladys Knight is the second studio album by American singer Gladys Knight. It was released by Columbia Records in 1979 in the United States. Her only solo album with that label, it peaked at number 71 on the US Top R&B/Hip-Hop Albums chart. Gladys Knight would remain Knight's last solo album until the 1991 release of Good Woman.

== Critical reception ==
Professional ratings
Review scores
Source	Rating
AllMusic	3/5 stars
The Rolling Stone Album Guide	2/5 stars

AllMusic editor Alex Henderson wrote that Gladys Knight "isn't remarkable, but is a generally decent effort that ranges from R&B/adult contemporary ballads to up-tempo soul-disco offerings like "You Bring Out the Best in Me" and "You Don't Have to Say I Love You," both of which would appeal to a Loleatta Holloway or Thelma Houston fan [...] This LP, which she produced with Jack Gold, isn't recommended to casual listeners, who would be much better off with an anthology of her classic Motown and Buddah recordings with the Pips. But it's a likable record that is worth hearing if you're among Knight's hardcore fans."

== Track listing ==
All tracks produced by Jack Gold.

Side one
No.	Title	Writer(s)	Length
1.	"Am I Too Late"	Jim Hurt; Larry Keith	4:26
2.	"You Bring Out the Best in Me"	Al De Lory; Cheryl Christiansen	3:59
3.	"I Just Want to Be With You"	Alvin Fields; Michael Zager	4:07
4.	"If You Ever Need Somebody"	David Williams; Johnny Bristol	4:06
5.	"My World"	Sam Dees	3:43

Side two
No.	Title	Writer(s)	Length
1.	"I (Who Have Nothing)"	Carlo Donida; Jerry Leiber; Mike Stoller	4:20
2.	"You Don't Have to Say I Love You"	Bonnie White; Pat Livingston; Phyllis Hardy	3:05
3.	"The Best Thing We Can Do Is Say Goodbye"	Arnold Goland; Christiansen; Gold	4:03
4.	"It's the Same Old Song"	Carolyn Johns; Larry Farrow	3:02
5.	"You Loved Away the Pain"	Ken Hirsch; Ronald Miller	3:56

== Charts ==
Chart (1979)	Peak position
US Top R&B/Hip-Hop Albums (Billboard)	71

== Release history ==
Region	Date	Format	Label	Ref.
Various	1979	Vinyl; cassette	Columbia Records	
