= Just for You (Gladys Knight album) =

Studio album by Gladys Knight
- Released: September 13, 1994
- Length: 48:47
- Label: MCA

Gladys Knight chronology
Good Woman (1991)	Just for You (1994)	Many Different Roads (1998)

Just for You is the fourth studio album by American singer Gladys Knight. It was released by MCA Records on September 13, 1994 in the United States. The album was nominated for the Grammy Award for Best R&B Album at the 37th awards ceremony, while "I Don't Want to Know" earned a nomination in the Best Female R&B Vocal Performance category.

== Critical reception ==
Professional ratings
Review scores
Source	Rating
Allmusic	3/5 stars

Allmusic editor Alex Henderson found that Just for You "is a decent R&B/pop effort that, although not in a class with Knight's classic Motown and Buddha recordings with the Pips, has more strengths than weaknesses. The singer's voice had held up impressively well over the years, and she uses it advantageously on a superb cover of The Impressions' 1969 classic "Choice of Colors" (clearly the highlight of the CD), as well as such memorable offerings as the gospel-influenced "Guilty" (a commentary on racism and sexism that makes its point without preaching) and the stirring ballad "Home Alone." The CD isn't essential, but it's generally honest, well-executed and satisfying."

== Track listing ==
No.	Title	Writer(s)	Producer(s)	Length
1.	"Next Time"	James Harris III; Terry Lewis	Jimmy Jam & Terry Lewis	4:27
2.	"I Don't Want to Know"	Kenneth Edmonds	Babyface	5:47
3.	"I'll Fall in Love If You Hang Around"	BeBe Winans; Rhett Lawrence	Winans; Lawrence	4:30
4.	"Our Love"	Attala Zane Giles; Gladys Knight	Giles; Knight^{[A]}	4:27
5.	"Home Alone"	Ann Nesby; Hames "Big Jim" Wright	Jimmy Jam & Terry Lewis	4:59
6.	"Choice of Colors"	Curtis Mayfield	Giles; Knight^{[A]}	3:52
7.	"Guilty"	Giles; Knight	Giles; Knight^{[A]}	2:56
8.	"Somehow He Loves Me"	Knight; James "D.C." Wilson	George Duke	5:58
9.	"End of the Road Medley (Live)"	Charles Simmons; Gamble & Huff; Joseph Jefferson; L.A. Reid; Edmonds	Knight; André Fischer^{[A]}	11:51

Notes

- ^{^[A]} denotes co-producer

== Charts ==
=== Weekly charts ===
Chart (1994)	Peak position
US Billboard 200	53
US Top R&B/Hip-Hop Albums (Billboard)	6

=== Year-end charts ===
Chart (1994)	Position
US Top R&B/Hip-Hop Albums (Billboard)	77
Chart (1995)	Position
US Top R&B/Hip-Hop Albums (Billboard)	48

== Certifications ==
Region	Certification	Certified units/sales
United States (RIAA)	Gold	500,000^{^}
^{^} Shipments figures based on certification alone.

== Release history ==
Region	Date	Format	Label	Ref.
Various	September 13, 1994	CD; cassette	MCA Records	
