= Accordionally Yours =

Studio album by Walter Ostanek and His Band
- Released: 1994
- Genre: Polka
- Label: World Renowned Sounds

Accordionally Yours is an album by Walter Ostanek and His Band. In 1994, the album won Ostanek the Grammy Award for Best Polka Album.

== Track listing ==
1. "Whoop Polka" – 2:45
2. "Singers & Players Polka" – 2:19
3. "Pretty Polly Polka" – 2:25
4. "I Never Knew Polka" – 2:25
5. "Emily's Waltz" – 2:39
6. "My Maria Polka" – 3:09
7. "You Are My Sunshine Polka" – 2:43
8. "I Knew from the Start Polka" – 2:48
9. "Clarinet Polka" – 2:28
10. "Please Leave Me Alone Waltz" – 2:39
11. "That Is Why Polka" – 2:24
12. "La Dee Da Oberek" – 3:06
13. "Kenny's Polka" – 2:37
14. "Lulubelle Polka" – 2:18
