= Before Me (album) =

Studio album by Gladys Knight
- Released: October 10, 2006
- Length: 52:51
- Label: Verve
- Producer: Tommy LiPuma; Phil Ramone

Gladys Knight chronology
A Christmas Celebration (2006)	Before Me (2006)	Another Journey (2013)

Professional ratings
Review scores
Source	Rating
USA Today	3.5/4 stars

Before Me is a studio album by American singer Gladys Knight. It was released by Verve Records on October 10, 2006 in the United States.

== Track listing ==
No.	Title	Writer(s)	Length
1.	"Do Nothing till You Hear from Me"	Bob Russell; Duke Ellington	3:57
2.	"The Man I Love"	George Gershwin; Ira Gershwin	4:22
3.	"Good Morning Heartache"	Dan Fisher; Ervin Drake; Irene Higginbotham	4:26
4.	"Since I Fell for You"	Buddy Johnson	3:52
5.	"God Bless the Child"	Arthur Herzog, Jr.; Billie Holiday	4:54
6.	"This Bitter Earth"	Clyde Otis	4:07
7.	"I Got It Bad (And That Ain't Good)"	Ellington; Paul Francis Webster	4:25
8.	"Someone to Watch Over Me"	G. Gershwin; I. Gershwin	4:55
9.	"But Not for Me"	G. Gershwin; I. Gershwin	4:01
10.	"I'll Be Seeing You"	Sammy Fain; Irving Kahal	3:58
11.	"Stormy Weather"	Harold Arlen; Ted Koehler	4:26
12.	"Come Sunday"	Ellington	5:35

== Charts ==
Chart (2006)	Peak position
US Billboard 200	93
US Top Jazz Albums (Billboard)	4
US Top R&B/Hip-Hop Albums (Billboard)	18

== Release history ==
Region	Date	Format	Label	Ref.
Various	October 10, 2006	CD; digital download	Verve Records	
