= Good Woman (Gladys Knight album) =

Studio album by Gladys Knight
- Released: July 2, 1991
- Length: 53:45
- Label: MCA
- Producer: D.C.; Attala Zane Giles; Barry Mann; Tim Miner; Michael J. Powell; Howie Rice

Gladys Knight chronology
Gladys Knight (1979)	Good Woman (1991)	Just for You (1994)

Good Woman is the third studio album by American singer Gladys Knight. It was released by MCA Records in 1991 in the United States. The album was nominated for the Grammy Award for Best Female R&B Vocal Performance at the 34th awards ceremony, while their rendition of "Superwoman" Knight, Dionne Warwick and Patti LaBelle a nomination in the Best R&B Performance by a Duo or Group with Vocal category.

== Critical reception ==
Professional ratings
Review scores
Source	Rating
AllMusic	3/5 stars
Calgary Herald	B
Entertainment Weekly	C−
Los Angeles Times	2/4 stars

AllMusic editor Alex Henderson wrote that "like her final recordings with the Pips, Good Woman found Knight taking an urban contemporary-oriented approach without sacrificing her artistic integrity. The highly infectious single "Men" is an absolute gem, and cuts ranging from the smooth "This Is Love" to the gritty new jack swing number "Meet Me In the Middle" are definitely the work of an artist being true to herself. Some may find it hard to imagine Knight embracing new jack swing, but in fact, she does so convincingly. Though a few of the cuts aren't very memorable, this is a CD that the veteran singer can, for the most part, be proud of."

== Track listing ==
No.	Title	Writer(s)	Producer(s)	Length
1.	"Men"	Attala Zane Giles; Cornelius Mims; Gladys Knight	Giles	4:44
2.	"Meet Me In the Middle"	Knight	D.C.	4:42
3.	"This Is Love"	Bobby Cavanest; Ronee Martin; Ramsey Embick	Howie Rice	5:24
4.	"Where Would I Be"	Jud Friedman; Karin Rybar	Michael J. Powell	4:50
5.	"Superwoman" (featuring Dionne Warwick & Patti LaBelle)	Kenneth Edmonds; Daryl Simmons; L.A. Reid	Powell	6:21
6.	"Give Me a Chance" (featuring David Peaston)	Bernard Wright; Cindy Cruse; Tim Miner	Miner	5:21
7.	"Good Woman"	Giles; Knight	Giles; D.C.	4:54
8.	"If You Only Knew"	Giles; Knight	Giles	4:56
9.	"Mr. Love"	Giles; Knight	Giles	3:47
10.	"Waiting On You"	Giles; Knight	Giles	4:55
11.	"In This Life"	Barry Mann; Cynthia Weil	Mann	4:08

Notes

- "In This Life" is omitted from the vinyl release due to space issues.

== Charts ==
=== Weekly charts ===
Chart (1991)	Peak position
US Billboard 200	45
US Top R&B/Hip-Hop Albums (Billboard)	1

=== Year-end charts ===
Chart (1991)	Position
US Top R&B/Hip-Hop Albums (Billboard)	40

== Release history ==
Region	Date	Format	Label	Ref.
Various	1991	CD; Vinyl; cassette	MCA Records	
