= Licence to Kill (song) =

Theme from 1989 James Bond film Licence to Kill

- Standard international artwork featuring Timothy Dalton as James Bond (vinyl sleeve pictured)

Single by Gladys Knight

from the album Licence to Kill soundtrack
- B-side: "Pam"
- Released: May 30, 1989
- Studio: Tarpan (San Rafael, California); Shakiji Inc. (Las Vegas, Nevada)
- Genre: R&B
- Length: 5:15
- Label: MCA
- Songwriters: Jeffrey E. Cohen; Narada Michael Walden; Walter Afanasieff
- Producers: Narada Michael Walden; Walter Afanasieff (asso.)

Gladys Knight singles chronology
"Loving On Borrowed Time" (1986)	"Licence to Kill" (1989)	"If I Knew Then What I Know Now" (1990)

James Bond theme singles chronology
"The Living Daylights" (1987)	"Licence to Kill" (1989)	"GoldenEye" (1995)

Audio sample
- file; help

"Licence to Kill" is a song by American singer Gladys Knight, written and recorded for the 1989 James Bond film Licence to Kill, taken from the soundtrack of the film's same name. The song was written by Narada Michael Walden, Jeffrey Cohen and Walter Afanasieff, and produced by Walden and associate production helmed by Afanasieff.

"Licence to Kill" was released as the soundtrack's lead single on May 30, 1989, by MCA Records.The song became a top-10 hit in the United Kingdom, peaking at number six and becoming Knight's last charting solo single there. In Europe, the song peaked atop the Swedish Singles Chart for eight weeks (four chart periods at the time) and reached the top five in seven other countries. It also peaked at number 79 on Canada's RPM 100 Singles chart but did not appear on the US Billboard Hot 100.

== Critical reception ==
Jerry Smith from Music Week wrote, "Gladys Knight beats all-comers for the dubious pleasure of singing the theme to the latest Bond movie, written and produced by Narada Michael Walden, and basically a pastiche of the best of the previous themes. It can't really fail." Pat Sharp for Smash Hits felt "Licence to Kill" "sounds very dramatic and James Bond-y".

== Track listings ==
- 7-inch single

A. "Licence to Kill" – 4:11
B. "Pam" (performed by Michael Kamen and the National Philharmonic Orchestra)

- 12-inch single

A1. "Licence to Kill" (extended version)
B1. "Pam" (performed by Michael Kamen and the National Philharmonic Orchestra)
B2. "Licence to Kill"

== Personnel ==
- Gladys Knight – vocals
- Narada Michael Walden – songwriter, producer, arranger
- Walter Afanasieff – songwriter, associate producer, arranger, orchestrator, keyboards, drum programming, percussion, Moog bass, synthesizer
- Jeffrey Cohen – songwriter
- Michael Kamen – orchestrator
- Gary Grant, Jerry Hey – horns
- Greg "Gigi" Gonaway – Paiste cymbals
- Ren Klyce – Fairlight synthesizer programming
- Claytoven Richardson, Jeanie Tracy, Karen "Kitty Beethoven" Brewington, Melisa Kary, Sandy Griffith, Skyler Jett – background vocals

== Charts ==
=== Weekly charts ===
Chart (1989)	Peak position
Belgium (Ultratop 50 Flanders)	3
Canada Top Singles (RPM)	79
Canada Adult Contemporary (RPM)	27
Denmark (IFPI)	2
Europe (Eurochart Hot 100)	2
Finland (Suomen virallinen lista)	12
France (SNEP)	28
Ireland (IRMA)	4
Italy Airplay (Music & Media)	3
Netherlands (Dutch Top 40)	2
Netherlands (Single Top 100)	2
Norway (VG-lista)	2
Sweden (Sverigetopplistan)	1
Switzerland (Schweizer Hitparade)	2
UK Singles (Official Charts)	6
US Adult Contemporary (Billboard)	18
US Hot R&B/Hip-Hop Songs (Billboard)	69
West Germany (GfK)	3

=== Year-end charts ===
Chart (1989)	Position
Belgium (Ultratop)	23
Europe (Eurochart Hot 100)	32
Netherlands (Dutch Top 40)	12
Netherlands (Single Top 100)	47
Switzerland (Schweizer Hitparade)	11
UK Singles (OCC)	87
West Germany (Media Control)	54

== Cover versions ==
In 2017, musician and producer Fernando Perdomo collaborated with former Pink Floyd backing vocalist and Blue Pearl lead singer Durga McBroom recording the song for the multi-artist compilation album Songs, Bond Songs: The Music of 007.
