= Carol Cymbala =

American choir director

Carol Cymbala is the choir director for the Brooklyn Tabernacle Choir at Brooklyn Tabernacle. The Brooklyn Tabernacle Choir has won 6 Grammy Awards. She is married to pastor Jim Cymbala and daughter of pastor Clair Hutchins.

== Awards ==
- Grammy Award for Best Gospel Choir or Chorus Album in 1993, 1995, 1999, 2000, 2001, and 2003
- 2005 Dove Award for Choral Collection of the Year
