= Brooklyn Tabernacle =

Nondenominational church in New York City

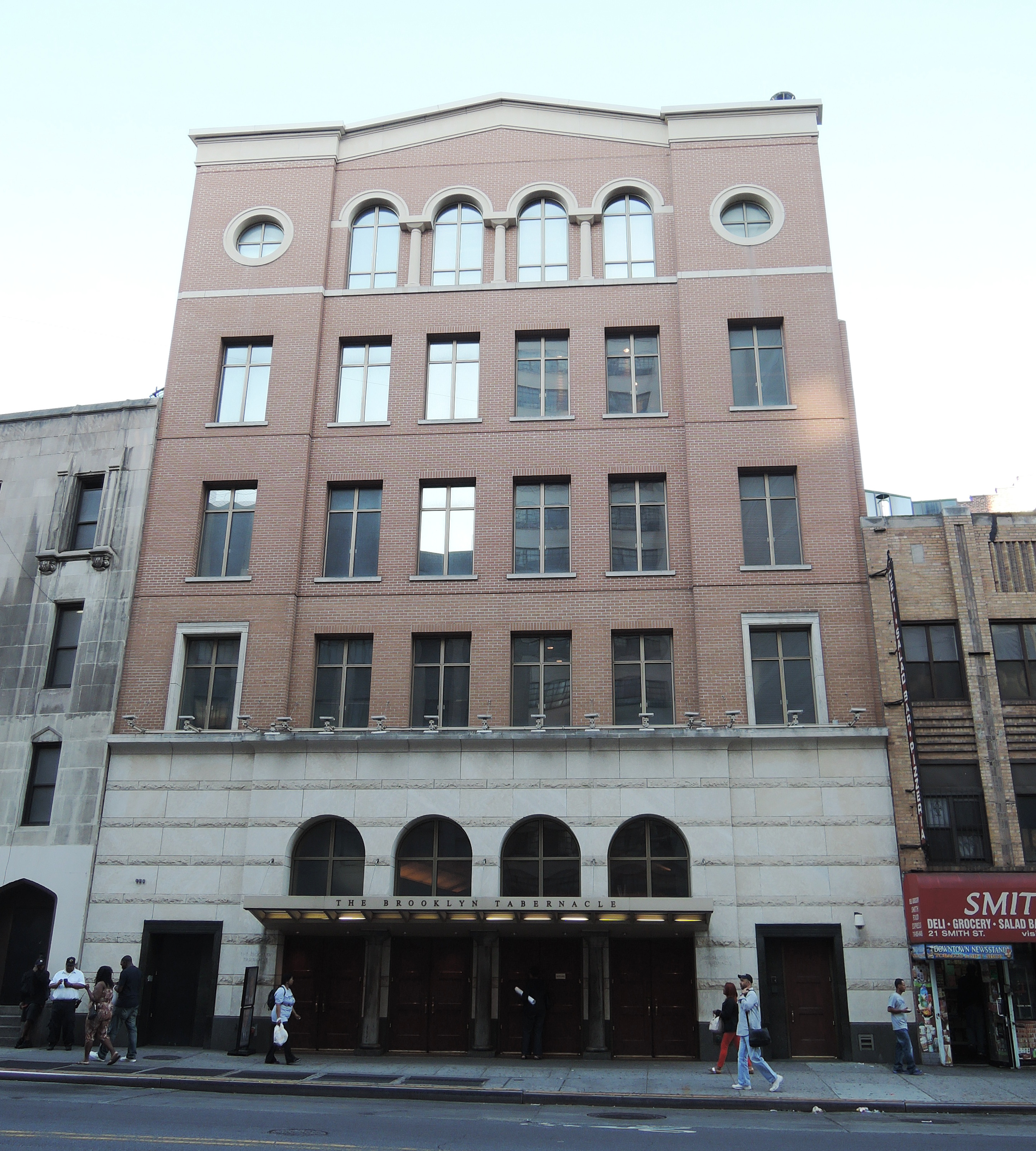
- Brooklyn Tabernacle
- 40°41′27″N 73°59′14.8″W
- Location: New York City
- Country: United States
- Denomination: Non-denominational Christian
- Website: brooklyntabernacle.org

History
- Founded: 1847

Brooklyn Tabernacle is an evangelical non-denominational megachurch located at 17 Smith Street at the Fulton Mall in downtown Brooklyn, New York City, United States. The senior pastor is Jim Cymbala.

== History ==
Artist's depiction of the second building, destroyed by fire October 13, 1889

The Brooklyn Tabernacle was originally established in 1847 as the Central Presbyterian Church, using the facilities of the First Presbyterian Church, at the corner of Willoughby Street and Pearl. Its original building was destroyed by fire. A second was built in a 14th-century Gothic style and dedicated on February 22, 1874. This too was destroyed by a fire on October 13, 1889.

In 1966, the church was renamed "Brooklyn Gospel Tabernacle" by the pastor Clair D. Hutchins.

By the time Pastor Jim and Carol Cymbala took over the church leadership in the autumn of 1971, the congregation had dwindled to only 40 people who met in a rundown building on Atlantic Avenue in Brooklyn.

In the 1980s, the Brooklyn Tabernacle purchased the former Carlton Theatre at 292 Flatbush Avenue at 7th Avenue, converting the 1,383-seat theatre into a church. After many years of decline, the church was revitalized as a non-denominational congregation, and became well-known as the home of the Brooklyn Tabernacle Choir.

In 1984, the church took its current name "The Brooklyn Tabernacle".

The church remained in this location until 2002 when they moved into the former Loew's Metropolitan Theatre at 17 Smith Street. The sanctuary seats 3,300 people.

The Brooklyn Tabernacle Choir has received seven Grammy Awards. It is directed by Carol Cymbala, the wife of the main Pastor, Jim Cymbala.

The Brooklyn Tabernacle Choir sang "The Battle Hymn of the Republic" at the 2013 second inauguration of Barack Obama.

The church has held three two-hour services weekly.

According to a church census published in 2024, it would have a weekly attendance of 10,000 people.

== Building ==
The current building was completely redone by Kostow Greenwood Architects and Robert Silman Associates by gutting and renovating the old vaudeville theater for modern worship, and with state-of-the-art acoustics and recording equipment. Two adjacent buildings were converted into offices, classrooms, community service areas, and dining facilities.

== See also ==
- List of the largest evangelical churches
- List of the largest evangelical church auditoriums
