= At Last (Gladys Knight album) =

Studio album by Gladys Knight
- Released: November 21, 2000
- Length: 59:29
- Label: MCA

Gladys Knight chronology
| Many Different Roads (1998) | At Last (2000) | One Voice (2005) |

At Last is a studio album by American singer Gladys Knight. It was released by MCA Records on November 21, 2000, in the United States. The album won the Grammy Award for Best Traditional R&B Vocal Album at the 43rd awards ceremony.

== Critical reception ==
Professional ratings
Review scores
| Source | Rating |
|---|---|
| AllMusic | 3/5 stars |
| New York Post | 2/4 stars |

AllMusic editor Liana Jonas found that on "At Last marks a refreshing return by Gladys Knight, who doesn't miss a beat," calling it "a much-welcomed return by the gifted vocalist who easily adapts to contemporary music without compromising her signature sweet tones. The 13 tracks featured on At Last are a blend of mid-tempo R&B fare and ballads. Because Knight seamlessly incorporates a 2001 music sensibility to this recording, At Last can comfortably sit alongside works by Destiny's Child, Toni Braxton, Faith Evans, and other younger musical counterparts [...] Being out of the studio for six years has had no effect on Knight, as she is in top form. Her voice is rich, soulful, and silk." New York Post critic Dan Aquilante wrote that At Last showed her in "terrific voice" but was "way too scattered," with "too much mush" and too little of the R&B/gospel style that defined her career. He concluded it was still good to hear her but hoping for a more focused effort.

== Track listing ==
At Last track listing
| No. | Title | Writer(s) | Producer(s) | Length |
|---|---|---|---|---|
| 1. | "Do You Really Want to Know (What Makes Me Fall in Love)" | Reed Vertelney, Sylvia Bennett Smith | Gladys Knight; Randy Jackson; Tiger | 3:29 |
| 2. | "If I Were Your Woman II" | Gary Brown; James "D.C." Wilson III | Brown; Wilson | 3:59 |
| 3. | "I Said You Lied" | Albert Claiborne Jr.; Bradley Spalter; Knight; Ty Lacey | Spalter | 5:06 |
| 4. | "Grandma's Hands" | Bill Withers | Knight; Jamey Jaz | 5:16 |
| 5. | "Love Hurts" | Kenneth "Babyface" Edmonds | Jon-John | 4:33 |
| 6. | "I Wanna Be Loved" (featuring Jamie Foxx) | Gordon Chambers | Shep Crawford | 4:20 |
| 7. | "Greatest Love of All" | Crawford; Kiesah Hakeem | Crawford | 4:25 |
| 8. | "Better Love Next Time" | Guy Roche; Shelly Peiken | Knight; Jackson; Tiger | 3:51 |
| 9. | "Please Help Me I'm Falling (In Love with You)" | Don Robertson; Hal Blair | Keith Thomas | 3:39 |
| 10. | "Something Blue" | Randy Goodrum; Stephanie Lewis | Knight; Wilson | 4:59 |
| 11. | "Just Take Me" | Christian Leuzzi | Tom Dowd | 3:43 |
| 12. | "Rose Bouquet" | Phil Vassar; Robert Byrne | Knight; Wilson | 4:44 |
| 13. | "That's Why They Call It Love" | Roche; Peiken | Knight; Jackson; Tiger | 4:55 |
| Total length: | | | | 59:29 |

== Charts ==
| Chart (2000) | Peak position |
|---|---|
| US Billboard 200 | 98 |
| US Top R&B/Hip-Hop Albums (Billboard) | 30 |

== Release history ==
| Region | Date | Format | Label | Ref. |
|---|---|---|---|---|
| Various | November 21, 2000 | CD; Cassette tape; digital download | MCA Records | |
