= Gladys Knight =

American singer (born 1944)

- Knight in 1997

Background information
- Also known as: The Empress of Soul
- Born: Gladys Maria Knight; May 28, 1944 (age 82); Atlanta, Georgia, U.S.
- Genres: Soul; R&B; pop; gospel
- Occupations: Singer; songwriter; actress
- Years active: 1948–present
- Labels: Vee-Jay; Motown; Buddah; Columbia; MCA; Verve
- Formerly of: Gladys Knight & The Pips
- Spouses: James Newman (m. 1960; div. 1973); Barry Hankerson (m. 1974; div. 1979); Les Brown (m. 1995; div. 1997); William McDowell (m. 2001)
- Website: gladysknight.com

Gladys Maria Knight (born May 28, 1944) is an American singer and actress. Knight recorded hits through the 1960s, 1970s, and 1980s with her family group Gladys Knight & the Pips, which included her brother Merald "Bubba" Knight and cousins William Guest and Edward Patten. She has won seven Grammy Awards (four as a solo artist and three with the Pips), and is often referred to as the "Empress of Soul".

Knight has recorded two number-one Billboard Hot 100 singles ("Midnight Train to Georgia" and "That's What Friends Are For" which she did with Dionne Warwick, Elton John and Stevie Wonder), eleven number-one R&B singles and six number-one R&B albums. In 1989, Knight recorded the theme song for the James Bond film Licence to Kill.

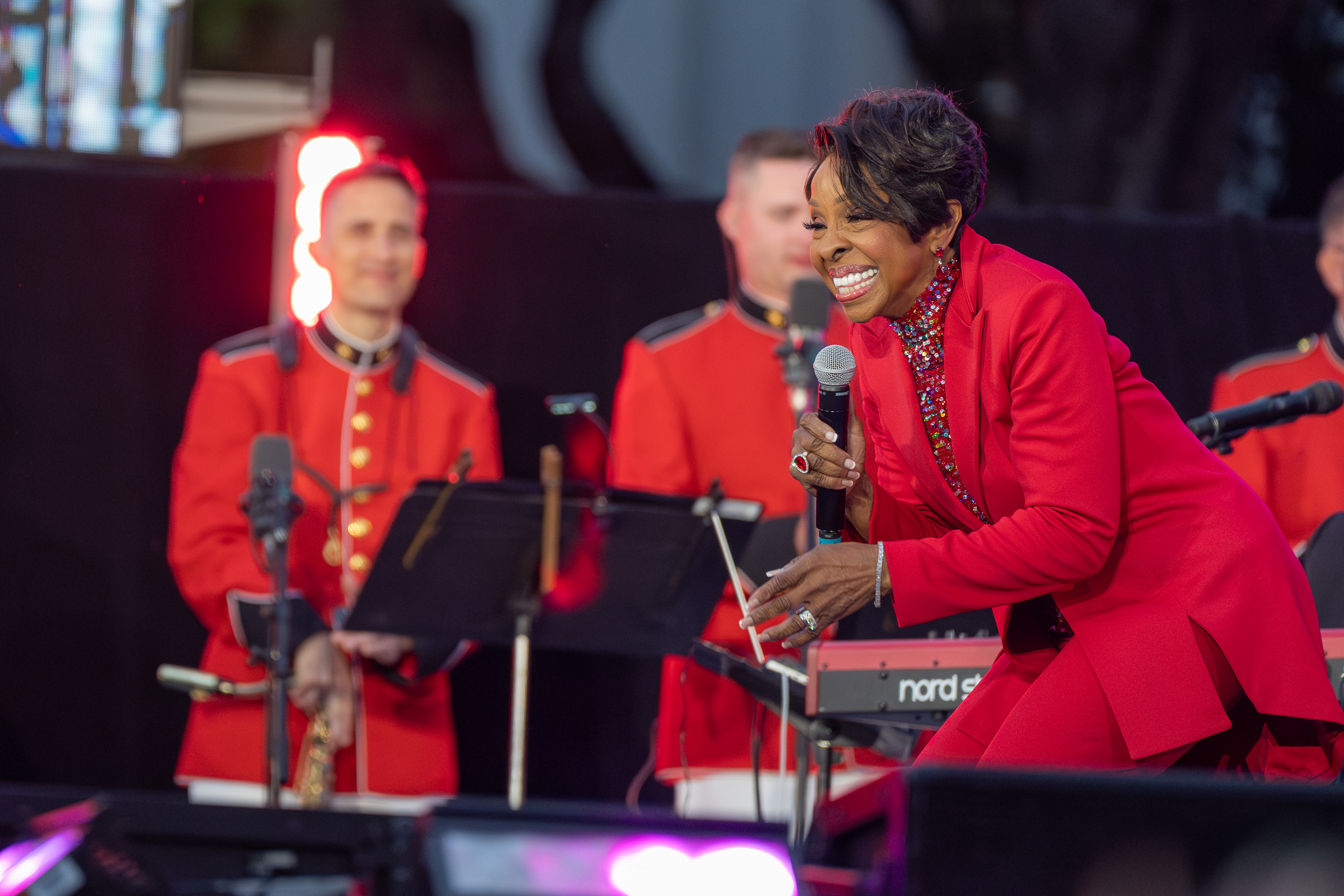
Knight performing at the White House, 2024

Two of her songs ("I Heard It Through the Grapevine" and "Midnight Train to Georgia") were inducted into the Grammy Hall of Fame for "historical, artistic and significant" value. She is an inductee into the Rock and Roll Hall of Fame and Vocal Group Hall of Fame along with The Pips. Rolling Stone magazine ranked Knight among the 100 Greatest Singers of All Time (2010). She is also a recipient of the National Medal of Arts and Kennedy Center Honors.

== Early life ==
Gladys Knight was born in Atlanta, Georgia, on May 28, 1944, to Sarah Elizabeth (née Woods), a nurse's aide, and Merald Woodlow Knight Sr., a postal worker. Her parents were members of both the church choir and a local choir group. She has a sister, Brenda, and two brothers, Merald "Bubba" Jr. and David "Billy".

Knight was raised Baptist and began singing gospel music at age four at the Mount Moriah Baptist Church in Atlanta. At the age of eight, she won Ted Mack's The Original Amateur Hour TV show contest singing Nat King Cole's "Too Young." Shortly after, Knight along with her brother Bubba, sister Brenda, and cousins Eleanor and William Guest performed together during Bubba's tenth birthday party after a record player malfunctioned. The quintet later formed a group at the encouragement of Knight's mother. The group settled on the name The Pips, inspired by the nickname of their cousin and manager, James "Pip" Woods.

The Pips performed at church, talent shows, and clubs opening for popular acts, then signed with Brunswick Records in 1957 and began releasing singles. After a few lineup changes, the group debuted their first album in 1960 when Knight was just 16. By then, she had recorded five songs and released her first hit single, “Every Beat of My Heart.” The group's success was later halted by Knight's departure to start a family with husband and musician Jimmy Newman, resuming soon after when she returned.

Knight attended the historic Booker T. Washington High School, in Atlanta, later transferring and graduating from Archer High School.

== Success with the Pips ==
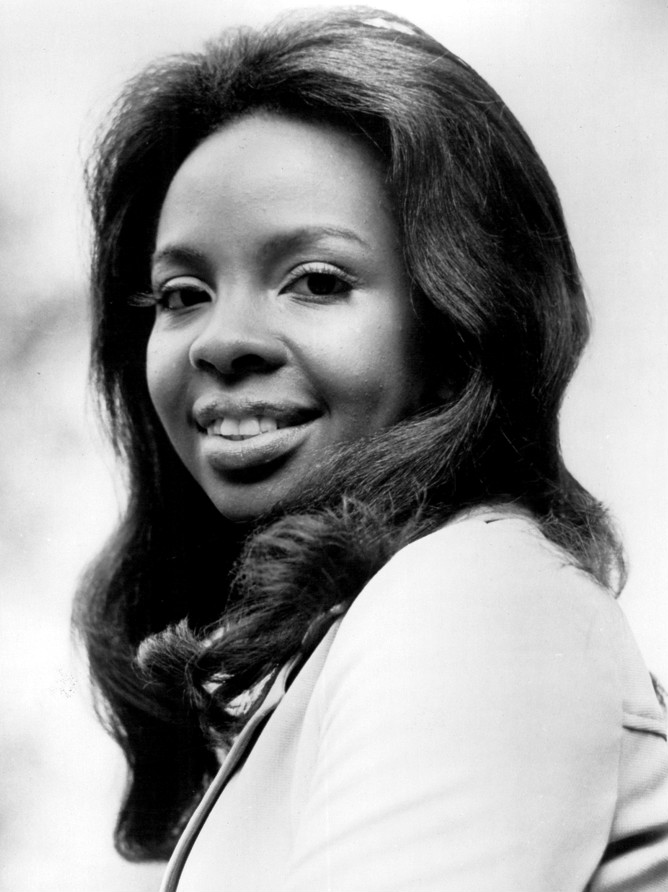
Knight in 1974

Gladys Knight & the Pips joined the Motown Records roster in 1966 (with only three hits to their credit - "Every Beat of My Heart", "Giving Up" and "Letter Full of Tears"), and, although initially regarded as a second-string act by the label, scored several major hit singles, including "I Heard It Through the Grapevine" (number one in 1967) (released later by Marvin Gaye), "The Nitty Gritty" (1969), "Friendship Train" (1969), "If I Were Your Woman" (1970), "I Don't Want To Do Wrong" (1971), the Grammy Award–winning "Neither One of Us (Wants to Be the First to Say Goodbye)" (1972), and "Daddy Could Swear (I Declare)" (1973).

In their early Motown career, Gladys Knight and the Pips toured as the opening act for Diana Ross and the Supremes. Gladys Knight stated in her memoirs that Ross kicked her off the tour because the audience's reception to Knight's soulful performance overshadowed her. Berry Gordy later told Knight that she was giving his act a hard time.

The act left Motown for a better deal with Buddah Records in 1973, and achieved even greater mainstream success that year with hits such as the Grammy-winning "Midnight Train to Georgia" (number one on the pop and R&B chart), "I've Got to Use My Imagination", "The Way We Were/Try To Remember" and "Best Thing That Ever Happened to Me". In the summer of 1974, Knight and the Pips recorded the soundtrack to the film Claudine with producer Curtis Mayfield, which included the songs "On and On", "The Makings of You" and "Make Yours a Happy Home".

The act was particularly successful in Europe, and especially the United Kingdom. Several of the Buddah singles became hits in the UK several years after their release in the US. For example, "Midnight Train to Georgia" hit the Top 5 of the UK singles chart in the summer of 1976, a full three years after its success in the U.S.

Knight and the Pips continued to have hits until the late 1970s, when they were forced to record separately due to legal issues, resulting in Knight's first solo LP recordings—Miss Gladys Knight (1978) on Buddah and Gladys Knight (1979) on Columbia Records. After divorcing James Newman II in 1973, Knight married Barry Hankerson, then Detroit mayor Coleman Young's executive aide. Knight and Hankerson remained married for four years, during which time they had a son, Shanga Ali. Hankerson and Knight became embroiled in a heated custody battle over Shanga Ali. In 1980, Johnny Mathis invited Knight to record two duets— "When A Child Is Born" (previously a hit for Mathis) and "The Lord's Prayer".

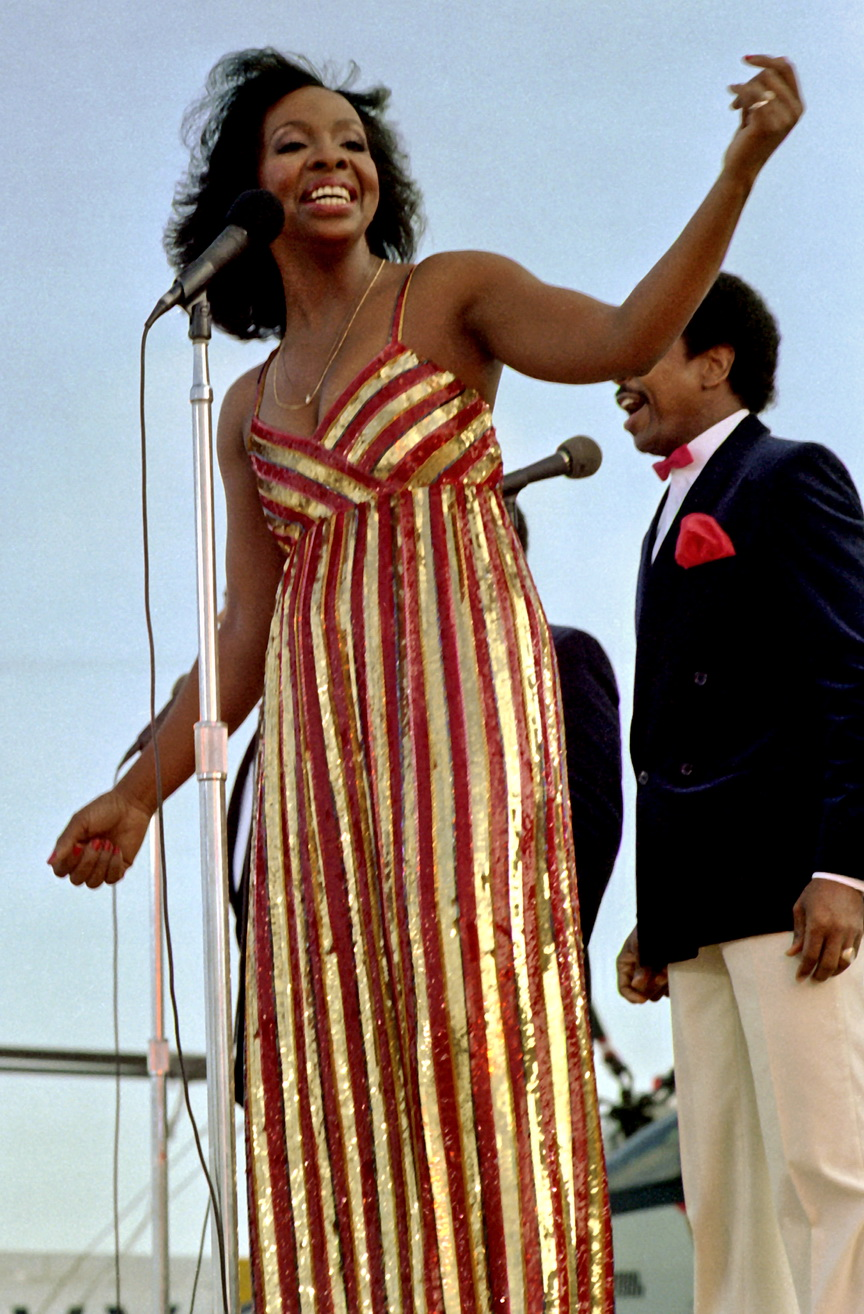
Knight and the Pips perform aboard the aircraft carrier USS Ranger in November 1981

Signing with Columbia Records in 1980 and restored to its familiar quartet form, Gladys Knight & the Pips began releasing new material. The act enlisted former Motown producers Nickolas Ashford and Valerie Simpson for their first two albums: About Love (1980), which included the hit "Landlord" and Touch (1981).

In 1983, Gladys Knight and the Pips scored again with the hit "Save the Overtime (For Me)". The song, under the artistic direction of Leon Sylvers III (known for collaborating on Shalamar hits), was done in a soulful boogie style. The single was released from their LP "Visions" and reached number 66 on the Hot 100, but was more successful on the R&B where it hit number one for a single week in mid 1983. The single was the first time the group hit number one on the R&B chart since 1974. The video accompanying the song became among the earliest R&B videos to incorporate elements of hip-hop culture. The album also included the R&B hit "You're Number One (In My Book)".

In 1987, Knight decided to pursue a solo career, and she and the Pips recorded their final LP together, All Our Love (1987), for MCA Records. Its infectious lead single, "Love Overboard", was a number-one R&B hit and won another Grammy for the act as well. After a successful 1988 tour, the Pips retired and Knight began her solo career. Gladys Knight & the Pips were inducted into the Georgia Music Hall of Fame in 1989, into the Rock and Roll Hall of Fame in 1996 and the Vocal Group Hall of Fame in 2001.

== Solo career and other musical endeavors ==
While still with the Pips, Gladys Knight joined with Dionne Warwick, Stevie Wonder, and Elton John on the 1985 AIDS benefit single, "That's What Friends Are For", a number one hit, which won a Grammy for Best Pop Performance By A Duo Or Group With Vocal.

Knight shared a stage with Dionne Warwick and Patti LaBelle for the 1986 HBO special Sisters in the Name of Love, which she co-executive produced and received three ACE Awards for Performance in a Music Special, as well as nominations for Best Music Special and Costume Design in 1987. On March 27, 1988, Knight performed a rendition of "America the Beautiful" at Wrestlemania 4 in Atlantic City, NJ. In 1989, she recorded "Licence to Kill", the title track for James Bond film of the same name, a Top-10 hit in the UK and Germany.

Knight released her third and most successful solo LP, Good Woman, on MCA in 1991, which hit number one on the R&B album chart, featured the number 2 R&B hit "Men", and reached number 45 on the main Billboard album chart — her all-time-highest showing. The album also featured "Superwoman", written by Babyface and featuring Dionne Warwick and Patti LaBelle; the track was nominated for a Grammy. Knight and LaBelle collaborated the same year on "I Don't Do Duets", for LaBelle's album Burnin'. Also in 1991, Knight performed the national anthem at Game 1 of the World Series.

Her fourth solo album, Just for You, went Gold and was nominated for the 1995 Grammy Award for Best R&B Album. The fifth solo album, At Last, earned her first solo Grammy Award for Best Traditional R&B Album in 2000.

Knight created and directs the Mormon-themed choir Saints Unified Voices. SUV has released a Grammy Award-winning CD titled One Voice, and occasionally performs at LDS church firesides.

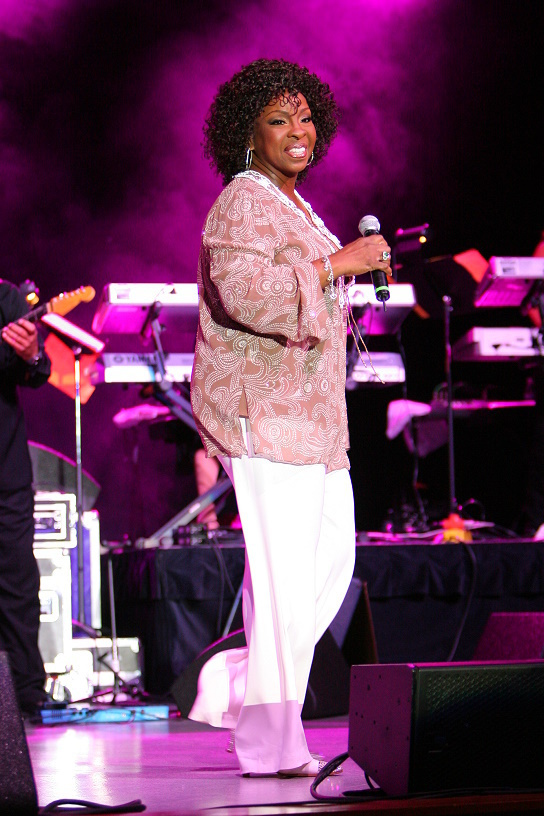
Knight in concert, 2006

In April 2004, Knight co-headlined the VH1's benefit concert Divas Live 2004 alongside Ashanti, Cyndi Lauper, Jessica Simpson, Joss Stone, Debbie Harry, and Patti LaBelle, in support of the Save the Music Foundation.

In 2005, a duet between Knight and Ray Charles of "You Were There" was released on Charles' duets album Genius & Friends.

In the spring of 2008, Knight appeared alongside Chaka Khan, Patti LaBelle and Diana Ross at the 'Divas with Heart' concert in aid of cardiac research, at New York's Radio City Hall. Also in 2008 Gladys, Jack Black, Robert Downey Jr. and Ben Stiller performed on American Idol to raise money for charity.

In 2009, Knight sang "His Eye Is On The Sparrow" and "The Lord's Prayer" at the funeral service for Michael Jackson.

In September 2011, a new, updated recording of Shirley Bassey's 1960s classic "I (Who Have Nothing)" was released on iTunes and Amazon.

In 2013, Knight recorded the Lenny Kravitz-written and -produced song "You And I Ain't Nothin' No More" for the soundtrack from Lee Daniels' motion picture The Butler. The song was added to the movie's soundtrack of older songs with various artists so the producers could nominate it for Best Song from a Motion Picture category at the Academy Awards.

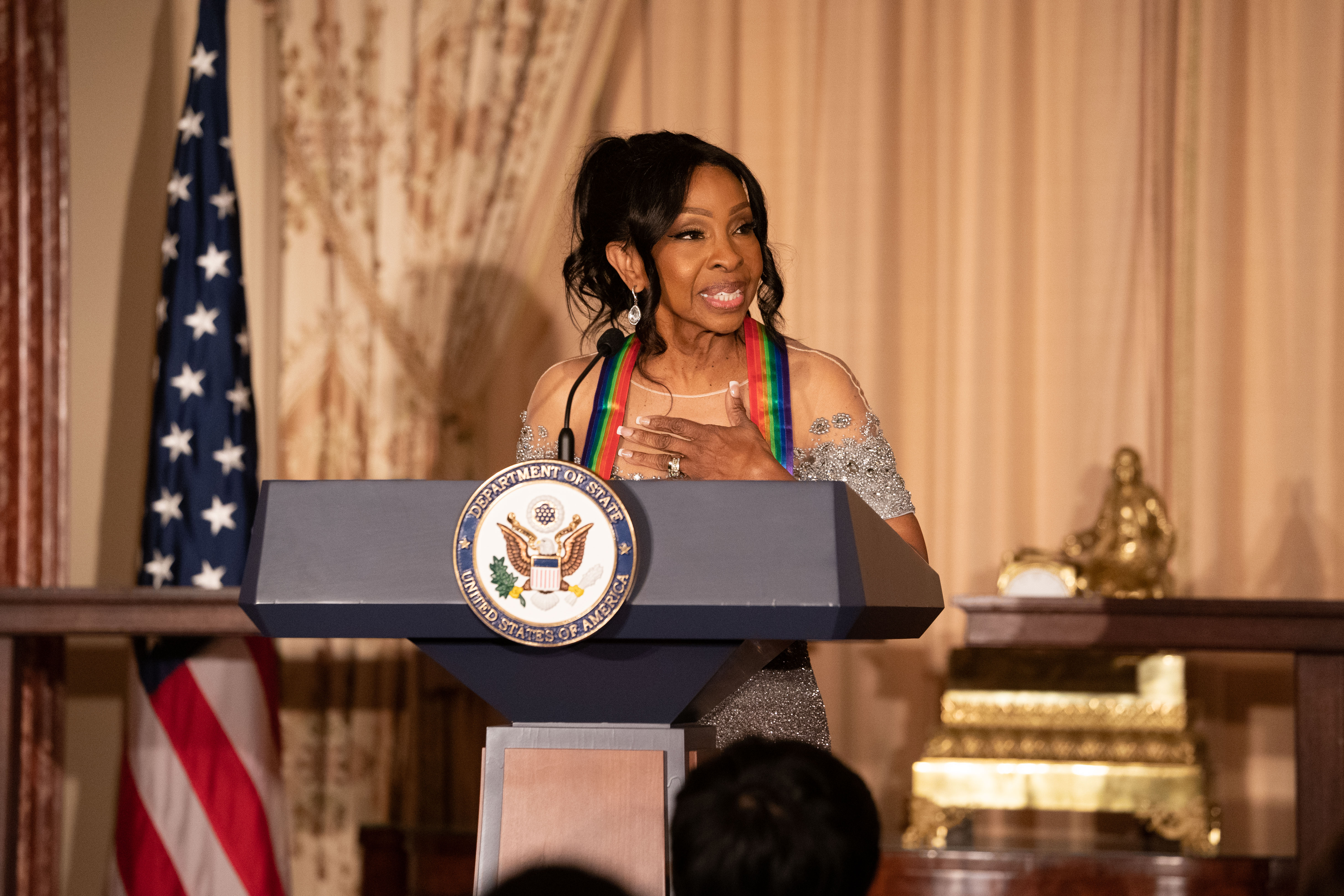
Knight receiving her Kennedy Center Honor in 2022

Where My Heart Belongs (2014) marked her 30th top-40 R&B album, including work by Gladys Knight & the Pips. In a 2014 interview, she expressed a hope that women would "Stand Up" and stop selling sex in the music/entertainment industry. She commented that the growing trend saddened her heart and that she had been taught to dress respectfully for her audiences ... "not take it off, put it on." Knight is ranked number 18 on VH1 network's list of the 100 Greatest Women of Rock.

In 2019, Knight accepted an invitation to sing the national anthem at Super Bowl LIII. She faced criticism for agreeing to perform due to the alleged blacklisting of Colin Kaepernick by the National Football League after he began protesting police brutality during pre-game anthem ceremonies. Similar criticism was expressed against the half-time show performers, Maroon 5, Travis Scott, and Big Boi. Knight defended her decision to sing, claiming to understand Kaepernick's reasons for protesting but criticizing him for kneeling during the national anthem.

In 2019, Knight was invited to play at the 100th Anniversary of Delaware State Fair, located in Harrington, Delaware.

In 2022, Knight received Kennedy Center Honors, presented by U.S. President Joe Biden. She also headlined a U.S.-Africa Leaders Summit Dinner at the White House.

=== Farewell tours ===
In October 2009, Knight started her farewell tour of the United Kingdom, which featured Tito Jackson as her supporting act and special appearances by Dionne Warwick.

The UK Farewell Tour featured higher production values than previous "Gladys Knight, a mic and a light" appearances by Knight in the UK. A glossy program was available and the show featured pre-produced animation on large on-stage screens. The tour was promoted by an appearance on the TV program Later... with Jools Holland where Knight performed "If I Were Your Woman" and "Help Me Make It Through the Night".

In spite of her "farewell", Knight started touring the UK again a few years later, playing gigs in Scotland and England in 2015, 2016, 2017, 2019, 2022 and 2024. A farewell tour of Australia and New Zealand was announced for March 2024.

In July 2026, Knight started touring with Smokey Robinson, co-heading the Just the Two of Us tour. In August 2026, TMZ reported that fans were concerned about Knight's disoriented behavior on stage during the tour after viral videos circulated. In response, Knight's husband and manager, William McDowell, released a statement from Knight stating she was cutting back touring and "transitioning into the next stage of my career and life moving forward. I'll be spending more time on projects with my husband and visiting with my grandbabies and am looking forward to this new era.". On August 27, 2026, Knight posted on Instagram,

"After much soul searching I've decided that I will be easing into fewer performances while focusing on transitioning into the next stage of ‘my career and life moving forward.

I'll be spending more time on projects with my husband and visiting with my grandbabies and am looking forward to this new era. I'd like to take a moment, in advance, to thank all my fans over this last three quarters of a century for making a little girl's dream come true and supporting her every step of the way. I am immensely grateful to all of you and send my eternal love back to you.

I hope to see your smiling faces out and about and on the road. God bless all of you and hope to see you soon.

With Love, Gladys"

— Gladys Knight, https://www.instagram.com/reels/DckLXpGRhnx/

== Acting ==
=== Film ===
In 1976, Knight made her acting debut as the lead in the film Pipe Dreams for which she was nominated for a Golden Globe Award for New Star of the Year – Actress. In 2003, she had a small role in the movie Hollywood Homicide, which starred Harrison Ford and Josh Hartnett. In 2009, Knight was featured in Tyler Perry's I Can Do Bad All by Myself, the film version of a play he had dramatized, and performed her song "The Need To Be" from the 1974 album I Feel a Song.

=== Television ===
In 1975, Knight starred in a variety show, The Gladys Knight and the Pips Show, which was canceled after four episodes. She also guest-starred on several TV series throughout the 1980s and 1990s, appearing on Benson, The Jeffersons, A Different World, Living Single, The Jamie Foxx Show, and New York Undercover. In 1985, she co-starred on the CBS sitcom Charlie & Co., alongside comedian Flip Wilson, which lasted for one season.

In April 2005, she portrayed a singer in an episode of JAG. In April 2009, she made a special guest appearance, and performed a song, on Tyler Perry's House of Payne. Knight has also made a number of cameo appearances, including on Las Vegas and 30 Rock. In 2012, she began a recurring role in the syndicated sitcom The First Family.

In 2012, Knight competed on season 14 of Dancing with the Stars, partnered with Tristan MacManus. They were eliminated on April 24 after losing a "dance duel" to Disney Channel star Roshon Fegan and partner Chelsie Hightower, ironically on the show's "Motown Week".

In 2017, she appeared as herself in the musical-drama TV series Star.

In 2018, she played Ella Grover, mother of Captain Lou Grover, in the "Lele pū nā manu like" ("Birds of a Feather...") episode of Hawaii Five-0, which first aired on November 16, 2018.

In February 2019, she was revealed to have competed as "Bee" on the first season of The Masked Singer, in which she placed third. She performed "Chandelier", "Locked Out of Heaven", "Wrecking Ball", "What's Love Got to Do with It", "(You Make Me Feel Like) A Natural Woman", and "I Can't Make You Love Me". She finished behind Donny Osmond as "Peacock" and T-Pain as "Monster".

== Business ventures ==
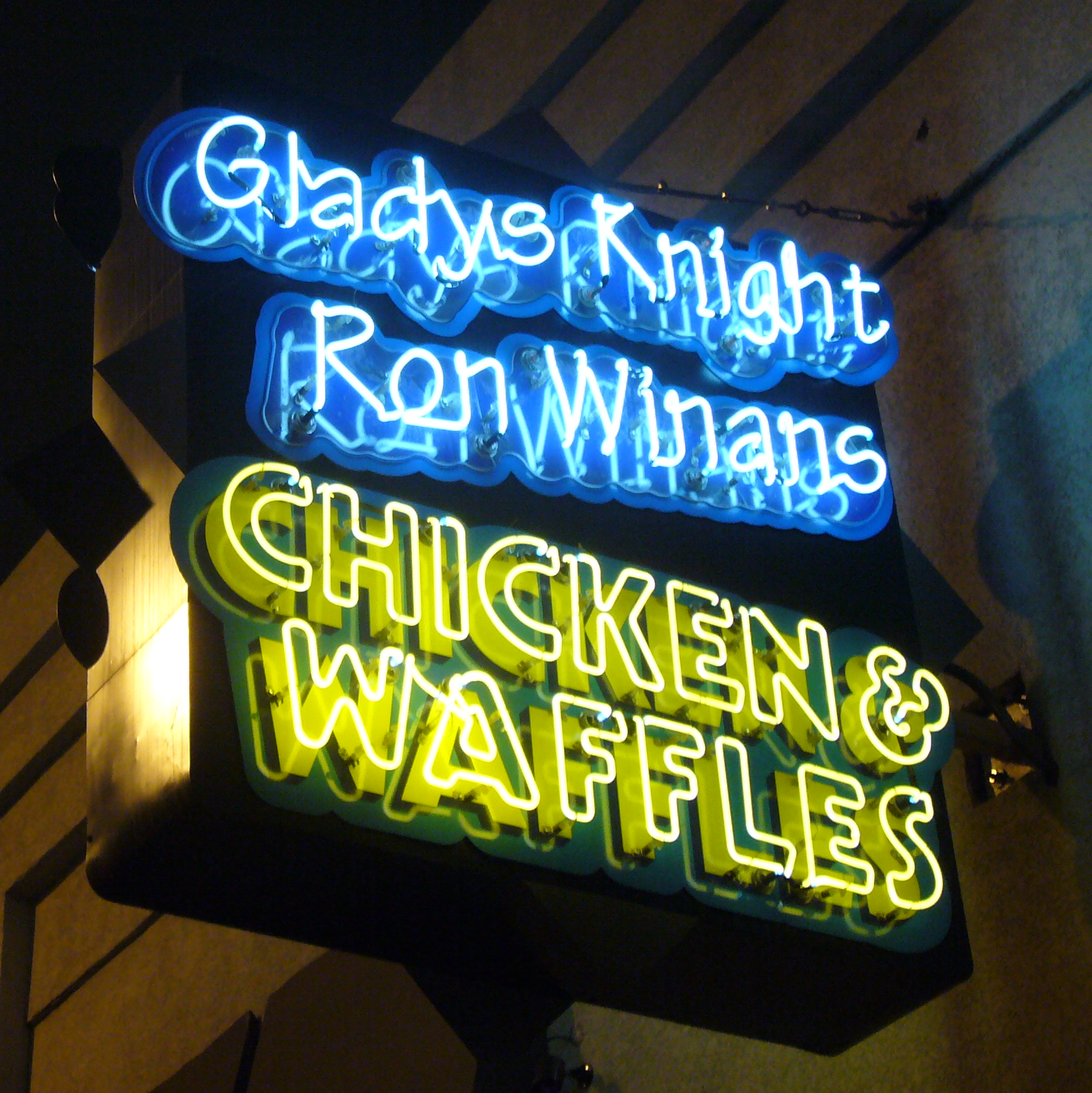
Knight and Ron Winans' Chicken & Waffles in Atlanta

Knight's son Shanga Hankerson owns a chain of chicken and waffles restaurants based in Atlanta, bearing her name. Gladys Knight & Ron Winans' Chicken & Waffles opened three locations in the Atlanta area. One location was featured on the Travel Channel original series Man v. Food. In June 2016, authorities in Georgia raided two of the restaurants and its headquarters.

In 2016, WSB-TV reported that Hankerson was at the center of an investigation involving unpaid taxes, penalties and interest. Georgia Department of Revenue Special Investigations Chief Jeff Mitchell told the station that the investigation solely involved Hankerson and not Knight.

== Personal life ==
In 1960, Knight married Atlanta musician and high school sweetheart James "Jimmy" Newman. The couple had a miscarriage and went on to have two children. Their son, James "Jimmy" Gaston Newman III, was born in 1962. Their daughter, Kenya Maria Newman, was born in 1963.

In the early 1960s, Knight's family and the Pips moved to Detroit. The family lived in Sherwood Forest, an upscale neighborhood on Detroit's West Side. Knight retired from the road to raise their children while the Pips toured on their own, later returning with Newman as the group's musical director. Newman later became addicted to drugs and left the family when Knight was 20. They remained married for over 12 years and were separated for 7 years until their divorce in 1973. Newman died a few years later.

In 1974, Knight married Barry Hankerson, the founder of Blackground Records, in Detroit. The couple had a son, Shanga Ali Hankerson, born on August 1, 1976. Around 1977, they relocated to Las Vegas. Their marriage ended in 1979 with a prolonged custody battle over their son. Knight spent over a million dollars searching for her son after he was kidnapped. In 1995, Knight married motivational speaker Les Brown, divorcing in 1997.

Knight was raised a Baptist, later was a Catholic, and was baptized in 1997 into the Church of Jesus Christ of Latter-day Saints (LDS Church), inspired by her daughter and son who had left Catholicism to join. She had occasionally teased LDS president Gordon B. Hinckley, saying they needed to inject some "pep" into their music. He agreed, which resulted in the founding of the Saints Unified Voices gospel choir directed by Knight. In 2018, Knight led the Be One Choir at the "Be One" event in Salt Lake City, Utah.

Knight has an honorary doctorate from Shaw University in Raleigh, North Carolina.

Knight's son Jimmy Newman III managed her career through his Newman Management Inc. until his death from heart failure on July 10, 1999, at age 36. Newman was survived by his wife, Michelene; daughters Nastasia and Gabrielle; and sons Rishawn, Stefan, and Sterling. Following his death, her daughter Kenya Jackson took over management.

Knight married William McDowell in 2001. They have seventeen grandchildren and ten great-grandchildren between them. Knight and McDowell reside in Fairview, North Carolina, near where they own a community center, the former Reynolds High School in Canton attended by McDowell.

Linebacker Demetrius Knight comes from the same Knight family. He and Gladys are "distant cousins."

In 2017, Knight helped raise $400,000 for the Children's Learning Centers of Fairfield County, in Stamford, Connecticut. The event was held at the Palace Theatre and was co-hosted by Carol Anne Riddell and Alan Kalter.

Knight had a gambling addiction that lasted more than a decade. In the late 1980s, after losing $60,000 in one night at the baccarat table, she joined Gamblers Anonymous, which helped her quit the habit.

== Legacy ==
In 1996, Gladys Knight & the Pips were inducted into the Rock and Roll Hall of Fame. One year before, Knight had received a star on the Hollywood Walk of Fame. In 2007, Knight received the Society of Singers ELLA Award at which time she was declared the "Empress of Soul". She is listed on Rolling Stone's list of the Greatest Singers of All Time. In 2021, Knight received the National Medal of Arts. In the following year Knight received a Kennedy Center Honor.

In 2023, Knight received a Grammy Lifetime Achievement Award. Knight has been portrayed by Brandy Norwood on the television series American Dreams in 2004, Elise Neal in the 2014 film Aaliyah: The Princess of R&B, Kelly Rowland on the 2019 series American Soul, Ledisi in the 2023 film Spinning Gold, and Liv Symone in the 2026 film Michael.

== Discography ==
Studio albums

- Miss Gladys Knight (1978)
- Gladys Knight (1979)
- Good Woman (1991)
- Just for You (1994)
- Many Different Roads (1998)
- At Last (2000)
- One Voice (with Saints Unified Voices) (2005)
- Before Me (2006)
- Another Journey (2013)
- Where My Heart Belongs (2014)

== Published works ==
- Knight, Gladys. At Home With Gladys Knight, McGraw-Hill, 2001 – ISBN 1-58040-075-2
- Knight, Gladys. Between Each Line of Pain and Glory: My Life Story, Hyperion Press, 1998 – ISBN 0-7868-8371-5

== Filmography ==
=== Films ===
Year	Title	Role	Notes
1976	Pipe Dreams	Maria Wilson	Golden Globe Award for New Star of the Year – Actress nominee
1987	Desperado	Mona Lisa	
1993	Twenty Bucks	Mrs. McCormic	
2003	Hollywood Homicide	Olivia Robidoux	
2006	Unbeatable Harold	Phyllis	
2006	Holidaze: The Christmas That Almost Didn't Happen	Candie (voice)	
2009	I Can Do Bad All by Myself	Wilma	Performed "The Need To Be" from the 1974 album I Feel a Song
2014	Seasons of Love	Ms. Angie	Holiday movie
2016	Almost Christmas	Dorothy, Shelter Director	
2021	Coming 2 America	Herself	
2022	I'm Glad It's Christmas	Cora Lawson, Businesswoman	Holiday movie

=== Television ===
Year	Title	Role	Notes
1981	The Muppet Show	Herself	Season 5, episode 16
1983	The Jeffersons	Herself	"The Good Life" (season 9: episode 20)
1985–1986	Charlie & Co.	Diana Richmond	18 episodes
1987	CBS Schoolbreak Special	Dr. Donna Robinson	"An Enemy Among Us" (season 4, episode 7)
1988	A Different World	Herself	"Three Girls Three" (season 2, episode 5)
1994	New York Undercover	Natalie	2 episodes
1997	Living Single	Odelle Jones	2 episodes
1999	Happily Ever After: Fairy Tales for Every Child	Chocolate	"The Bremen Town Musicians" (season 3, episode 3)
1996–2001	The Jamie Foxx Show	Janice King	11 episodes
2003	American Juniors	Herself / Judge	
2005	JAG	Etta	"Unknown Soldier" (season 10, episode 20)
2008	30 Rock	Herself	"210" (season 2, episode 10)
2009	House of Payne	Herself	"The Talent Show" (season 5, episode 20)
2012–2013	The First Family	Grandma Carolyn	9 episodes
2015	Hot in Cleveland	Miss Shonda	1 episode
2017	Star	Herself	2 episodes
2018	Hawaii Five-0	Ella Grover	"Lele pū nā manu like" ("Birds of a Feather...")
2019	The Masked Singer	Bee/Herself	Third place

== Awards, honors, and achievements ==
=== Grammy Awards ===
Knight has won seven Grammys with twenty-two nominations altogether.

Year	Nominee / work	Award	Result
1968	"I Heard It Through The Grapevine" (award for Knight, performance by Gladys Knight & the Pips)	Best Rhythm & Blues Solo Vocal Performance, Female	Nominated
1970	"Friendship Train" (Gladys Knight & the Pips)	Best R&B Vocal Performance By A Duo Or Group	Nominated
1972	"If I Were Your Woman" (Gladys Knight & the Pips)	Best R&B Vocal Performance By A Group	Nominated
1973	"Help Me Make It Through the Night" (Gladys Knight & the Pips)	Best R&B Vocal Performance By A Duo, Group Or Chorus	Nominated
1974	"Neither One of Us (Wants to Be the First to Say Goodbye)" (Gladys Knight & the Pips)	Best Pop Vocal Performance By A Duo, Group Or Chorus	Won
1974	"Midnight Train To Georgia" (Gladys Knight & the Pips)	Best R&B Vocal Performance By A Duo Or Group	Won
1975	"I Feel A Song (In My Heart)" (Gladys Knight & the Pips)	Best R&B Vocal Performance By A Duo, Group Or Chorus	Nominated
1976	"The Way We Were"/"Try to Remember" (Gladys Knight & the Pips)	Best Pop Vocal Performance By A Group	Nominated
1978	"Baby Don't Change Your Mind" (Gladys Knight & the Pips)	Best R&B Vocal Performance By A Duo, Group Or Chorus	Nominated
1981	About Love (Gladys Knight & the Pips)	Best R&B Performance By A Duo Or Group With Vocal	Nominated
1986	"That's What Friends Are For" (Dionne Warwick, Elton John, Gladys Knight & Stevie Wonder)	Best Pop Performance By A Duo Or Group With Vocal	Won
1986	"That's What Friends Are For" (Dionne Warwick, Elton John, Gladys Knight & Stevie Wonder)	Record of the Year	Nominated
1988	"Love Overboard" (Gladys Knight And the Pips)	Best R&B Performance By A Duo Or Group With Vocal	Won
1991	"Superwoman" (Gladys Knight, Patti LaBelle & Dionne Warwick)	Best R&B Performance By A Duo Or Group With Vocal	Nominated
1991	Good Woman	Best R&B Vocal Performance, Female	Nominated
1994	Just for You	Best R&B Album	Nominated
1994	"I Don't Want to Know"	Best Female R&B Vocal Performance	Nominated
1996	"Missing You" (Brandy, Tamia, Gladys Knight & Chaka Khan)	Best Pop Collaboration with Vocals	Nominated
1999	Many Different Roads	Best Contemporary Soul Gospel Album	Nominated
2001	At Last	Best Traditional R&B Vocal Album	Won
2004	"Heaven Help Us All" (Gladys Knight & Ray Charles)	Best Gospel Performance	Won
2005	One Voice (Gladys Knight & Saints Unified Voices)	Best Gospel Choir or Chorus Album	Won

=== Other awards and honors ===
- 1992: Essence Award for Career Achievement
- 1995: Hollywood Walk of Fame
- 1996: Rock and Roll Hall of Fame
- 1997: Trumpet Awards Foundation Pinnacle Award
- 2005: BET Lifetime Achievement Award
- 2007: NAACP Image Award for Outstanding Jazz Artist
- 2007: Society of Singers Ella Award, also declared the "Empress of Soul"
- 2008: BET Inaugural Best Living Legend Award
- 2008: National Black Arts Festival Honoree at Legends Celebration
- 2011: Soul Train Music Awards Lifetime Achievement Award
- 2017: National Rhythm & Blues Hall of Fame
- 2019: Golden Plate Award of the American Academy of Achievement
- 2021: National Medal of Arts
- 2022: 45th Annual Kennedy Center Honors

=== Honorary degrees ===
- Honorary Doctorate in Performing Arts, Shaw University
