= Saints Unified Voices =

American gospel music choir

- Choir
- Founded: 2002 (23 years ago)
- Founder: Gladys Knight
- Genre: Gospel
- Members: 100
- Music director: Gladys Knight
- Headquarters: Henderson, Nevada; United States
- Associated groups: Gladys Knight
- Awards: 2005 Grammy Award for "Best Gospel Album"

Saints Unified Voices is a Grammy Award-winning American gospel music choir based in the Las Vegas Valley of Southern Nevada. The Saints Unified Voices Foundation, the governing organization of the choir, is directed by a board of directors, which includes Gladys Knight. The choir is affiliated with The Church of Jesus Christ of Latter-day Saints.

== Early years ==
In the Spring of 1999, Gladys Knight put together a small singing group to perform with her at Women's Conference at Brigham Young University in Provo, Utah. Later, in 2001, Sullivan Richardson asked her to form a choir to perform at a special fireside event back home in Henderson, Nevada. Vocalists came from as far away as Los Angeles to audition for the choir and members of the choir even travel from Utah for practices.

In 2003, the choir was invited to perform at Salt Lake Tabernacle on Temple Square in Salt Lake City, Utah as part of the anniversary celebration of the priesthood being available to all worthy men.

== Recordings ==
=== One Voice ===
The choir released a CD, One Voice, on January 4, 2005. In the first week, the album soared to Billboard's #1 on the Hot Shot Debut, while it simultaneously shot to the #1 Gospel Album and #2 Inspirational Album on iTunes. It remained in the top 40 on Billboard′s Gospel charts for 48 weeks.

Track Listings

1. One Voice (Interlude) - Gladys Knight, written by Matthew Pittman
2. Over My Head - Gladys Knight
3. Come, Come, Ye Saints - Gladys Knight, written by William Clayton
4. Love One Another - Gladys Knight, written by Luacine Clark Fox
5. Pass Me Not - Gladys Knight
6. Right Here Waiting - (Damon Andelin and J. Johnigan) written by BeBe Winans
7. Prayer - Gladys Knight, written by Mauli B
8. Did You Know - Gladys Knight and John Fluker, written by BeBe Winans
9. I Am a Child of God - Gladys Knight, lyrics written by Naomi W. Randall
10. Jesu Me Kanaka Waiwai - (Joe Apo soloist)
11. Blessed Assurance - Gladys Knight
12. He Shines on Me - (Kelly Eisenhour soloist), written by John Fluker and Kelly Eisenhour
13. Uphold Me - (Whitney Te'o soloist) written by Fred Manns
14. He's Worthy - (John Fluker soloist)
15. He Lives - Gladys Knight

=== A Christmas Celebration ===
The 100-voice choir released its second album A Christmas Celebration in October 2006.
Track Listings

1. Introduction/Opening - Gladys Knight
2. Breath of Heaven - (Kenya Jackson soloist), written by Chris Eaton
3. Silent Night/O Holy Night - Gladys Knight, written by Joseph Mohr
4. I Wonder as I Wander - (Heather Goedel soloist), written by John Jacob Niles
5. We Three Kings - (Jay Young soloist), written by John H. Hopkins Jr.
6. Little Drummer Boy - Gladys Knight, written by Katherine Davis
7. Oh, Come, All Ye Faithful - (Rashida Jordan soloist), written by John Francis Wade
8. Jesus, Oh, What a Wonderful Child-(Quartet) Gladys Knight, Damon Andelin, Whitney Te'o, Rashida Jordan, & the incomparable SUV BASE section
9. The Christmas Song (Chestnuts Roasting on an Open Fire) - (Whitney Te'o soloist), written by Mel Torme
10. White Christmas - Gladys Knight, written by Irving Berlin
11. Winter Wonderland/Jingle Bells - Gladys Knight, written by Richard B. Smith
12. The Lord's Prayer - (Damon Andelin soloist)

== Live performances ==
The choir presents its program "One Voice: An Evening of Music & Testimony" at stake centers and other buildings owned by the Church of Jesus Christ of Latter-day Saints across the US, and has traveled as far as England and Hawaii to share the gospel through music and song.

== Awards and certifications ==
Shortly after learning that her choir had been nominated for a Grammy Award, Gladys Knight said: "A Grammy nomination is always an honor, but this means even more to me because I share it with my choir. We worked hard making this album for the Lord. It's wonderful that it also pleases the music industry." On February 8, 2006, it was announced that the album One Voice won the 2005 Grammy Award for Best Gospel Choir Or Chorus Album as part of the 48th Annual Grammy Awards.

== See also ==
- Culture of The Church of Jesus Christ of Latter-day Saints
