= M People discography =

British house music band discography

- Studio albums: 4
- Extended plays: 1
- Compilation albums: 5
- Singles: 20
- Video albums: 3
- Remix albums: 1

The discography of M People, a British house music band, consists of four studio albums, one remix album, five compilation albums, one extended play and twenty-one singles.

== Albums ==
=== Studio albums ===
Title	Album details	Peak chart positions										Certifications
Title	Album details	UK	AUS	AUT	FIN	GER	NED	NZ	SWE	SWI	US Heat	Certifications
Northern Soul	Released: March 1992; Label: Deconstruction (#74321117772)	26	150	—	—	—	—	—	—	—	—	UK: Gold
Elegant Slumming	Released: 4 October 1993; Label: Deconstruction (#74321166782)	2	7	23	23	18	67	1	37	19	12	UK: 3× Platinum; AUS: Gold; GER: Gold; NZ: Platinum
Bizarre Fruit	Released: 14 November 1994; Label: Deconstruction (#74321240812)	3	14	28	36	30	—	4	—	29	17	UK: 5× Platinum; AUS: Platinum; GER: Gold; NZ: Platinum
Fresco	Released: 13 October 1997; Label: M People Records (#74321524902)	2	51	21	—	11	76	5	37	20	—	UK: 2× Platinum; NZ: Gold
"—" denotes items that did not chart or were not released in that territory.

=== Reissues ===
Title	Album details	Peak chart positions	
Title	Album details	AUT	NZ
Bizarre Fruit II	Released: 27 November 1995; Label: Deconstruction (#74321328172)	29	24

=== Compilation albums ===
Title	Album details	Peak chart positions										Certifications
Title	Album details	UK	AUS	AUT	BEL	FIN	GER	NZ	NOR	SCO	SWI	Certifications
The Best of M People	Released: 2 November 1998; Label: M People Records (#74321613872)	2	101	27	41	34	20	21	2	2	39	UK: 3× Platinum; NZ: Platinum
Testify	Released: 25 May 1999; Label: Epic	—	—	—	—	—	—	—	—	—	—	
Ultimate Collection (featuring Heather Small)	Released: 5 April 2005; Label: Sony BMG (#82876669192)	17	—	—	—	—	—	—	—	22	—	UK: Gold
One Night in Heaven: The Best of M People	Released: 3 December 2007; Label: Sony BMG	—	—	—	—	—	—	—	—	—	—	
Gold	Released: 1 November 2019; Label: Crimson	53	—	—	—	—	—	—	—	—	—	
"—" denotes items that did not chart or were not released in that territory.

=== Remix albums ===
Title	Album details
Ultimate Collection: The Remixes	Released: 4 October 2005; Label: Sony BMG

== Extended plays ==
Title	EP details	Chart Peaks	
Title	EP details	UK	FIN
Elegantly American	Released: 5 September 1994; Label: Deconstruction	31	19

== Singles ==
Year	Title	Peak chart positions										Certifications	Album
Year	Title	UK	AUS	BEL	EUR	GER	ICE	IRE	NZ	SCO	US	Certifications	Album
1991	"How Can I Love You More?"	29	—	—	88	—	—	—	—	—	—		Northern Soul
1992	"Colour My Life"	35	205	—	—	—	—	—	—	—	—		Northern Soul
1992	"Someday"	38	—	—	—	—	—	—	—	—	—		Northern Soul
1992	"Excited"	29	—	—	—	—	—	—	—	—	—		Northern Soul
1993	"How Can I Love You More?" (Remix)	8	138	—	24	—	—	10	—	—	—		Northern Soul
1993	"One Night in Heaven"	6	23	22	26	15	5	12	—	—	—		Elegant Slumming
1993	"Moving On Up"	2	4	18	12	21	34	4	4	—	34	AUS: Platinum; NZ: Gold; UK: Silver	Elegant Slumming
1993	"Don't Look Any Further"	9	75	33	23	29	2	16	4	—	—		Elegant Slumming
1994	"Renaissance"	5	60	26	17	83	19	8	27	8	—		Elegant Slumming
1994	"Sight for Sore Eyes"	6	20	31	17	57	32	13	17	4	—		Bizarre Fruit/ Bizarre Fruit II
1995	"Open Your Heart"	9	25	40	24	54	12	15	21	8	—		Bizarre Fruit/ Bizarre Fruit II
1995	"Search for the Hero"	9	37	—	29	39	18	13	—	8	—	UK: Silver	Bizarre Fruit/ Bizarre Fruit II
1995	"Love Rendezvous"	32	114	—	59	75	40	—	—	32	—		Bizarre Fruit/ Bizarre Fruit II
1995	"Itchycoo Park"	11	27	—	—	55	24	16	21	11	—		Bizarre Fruit/ Bizarre Fruit II
1997	"Just for You"	8	110	—	34	76	31	11	23	8	—		Fresco
1997	"Fantasy Island"	33	136	—	63	76	38	—	39	34	—		Fresco
1998	"Angel St"	8	178	—	24	79	31	28	—	6	—		Fresco
1998	"Testify"	12	—	—	66	—	—	—	—	10	—		The Best of M People
1999	"Dreaming"	13	—	—	56	—	—	—	—	12	—		The Best of M People
"—" denotes items that did not chart or were not released in that territory.

== Videos ==
=== Video albums ===
Year	Video details	UK Music Video Chart Peak	Notes
1993	Elegant TV: Released: 1 November 1993; Label: BMG; Format: VHS	20	Includes interviews, live performances and backstage footage.
1995	Come Again: Released: 1995; Label: BMG; Format: VHS	18	Live concert recorded at the G-Mex in Manchester.; Also includes music videos from Bizarre Fruit.
1998	One Night in Heaven: Released: 1998; Label: Eagle Vision; Format: VHS, DVD	14	Live concert recorded for the Later... with Jools Holland M People special.
