= The Best of M People =

Greatest hits album by M People
- Released: 2 November 1998
- Recorded: January 1993 – August 1998
- Genre: Dance-pop, house, soul
- Label: M People Records
- Producer: M People

M People chronology
Fresco (1997)	The Best of M People (1998)	Testify (1999)

Singles from The Best of M People
- 1. "Testify" Released: 26 October 1998; 2. "Dreaming" Released: 1 February 1999

Professional ratings
Review scores
Source	Rating
AllMusic	4.5/5 stars

The Best of M People is the first greatest hits album by English dance music band M People, released in 1998. The album contains seventeen tracks, including ten UK top 10 hits and three new songs: "Testify", "Dreaming" (which both reached the UK top 20) and a cover version of The Doobie Brothers' "What a Fool Believes". A limited edition was released, including a bonus live album with eight tracks recorded at the Later... with Jools Holland M People special, plus enhanced content. The album is now available in the United States through iTunes.

There was also an advanced sampler called Classic and a promotional version containing the same content as the bonus live disc but with more sound excerpts and full videos.

== Track listing ==
=== Original version ===
No.	Title	Writer(s)	Album	Length
1.	"Testify"	Mike Pickering, Paul Heard, Heather Small	Previously unreleased	3:57
2.	"Search for the Hero"	Pickering, Heard	Bizarre Fruit	4:09
3.	"Moving On Up"	Pickering, Heard	Elegant Slumming	3:35
4.	"Angel St"	Pickering, Heard, Small	Fresco	4:10
5.	"One Night in Heaven"	Pickering, Heard	Elegant Slumming	4:23
6.	"Itchycoo Park"	Steve Marriott, Ronnie Lane	Bizarre Fruit II	3:56
7.	"Sight for Sore Eyes"	Pickering, Heard, Small	Bizarre Fruit	3:56
8.	"Just for You"	Pickering, Heard, Small	Fresco	4:00
9.	"Colour My Life"	Pickering	Northern Soul	3:40
10.	"How Can I Love You More?" (Remix)	Pickering, Heard	Northern Soul	4:42
11.	"Dreaming"	Pickering, Heard, Small	Previously unreleased	4:41
12.	"Open Your Heart"	Pickering, Heard, Small	Bizarre Fruit	3:38
13.	"Don't Look Any Further"	Franne Golde, Dennis Lambert, Duane Hitchings	Elegant Slumming	3:50
14.	"Someday"	Marshall Jefferson	Northern Soul	3:43
15.	"Renaissance"	Pickering, Heard	Elegant Slumming	3:51
16.	"Fantasy Island"	Pickering, Heard, Small	Fresco	4:12
17.	"What a Fool Believes"	Michael McDonald, Kenny Loggins	Previously unreleased	4:36

Limited Edition bonus live disc
No.	Title	Writer(s)	Length
1.	"Search for the Hero" (Live)	Pickering, Heard	5:40
2.	"Moving On Up" (Live)	Pickering, Heard	5:53
3.	"One Night in Heaven" (Live)	Pickering, Heard	6:39
4.	"Sight for Sore Eyes" (Live)	Pickering, Heard, Small	7:17
5.	"Just for You" (Live)	Pickering, Heard, Small	5:53
6.	"Colour My Life" (Live)	Pickering	3:30
7.	"Open Your Heart" (Live)	Pickering, Heard, Small	3:41
8.	"Someday" (Live)	Jefferson	4:50

=== Classic version ===
No.	Title	Writer(s)	Album	Length
1.	"One Night in Heaven"	Pickering, Heard	Elegant Slumming	4:23
2.	"Angel St"	Pickering, Heard, Small	Fresco	4:10
3.	"Sight for Sore Eyes"	Pickering, Heard, Small	Bizarre Fruit	3:56
4.	"Search for the Hero"	Pickering, Heard	Bizarre Fruit	4:09
5.	"Colour My Life"	Pickering	Northern Soul	3:40
6.	"Moving On Up"	Pickering, Heard	Elegant Slumming	3:35
7.	"How Can I Love You More?"	Pickering, Heard	Northern Soul	4:42
8.	"Itchycoo Park"	Marriott, Lane	Bizarre Fruit II	5:38
9.	"Open Your Heart"	Pickering, Heard, Small	Bizarre Fruit	3:38
10.	"Just for You"	Pickering, Heard, Small	Fresco	4:00
11.	"Don't Look Any Further"	Golde, Lambert, Hitchings	Elegant Slumming	3:50
12.	"Excited"	Pickering, Heard	Northern Soul	3:43
13.	"Someday"	Jefferson	Northern Soul	3:43
14.	"Fantasy Island"	Pickering, Heard, Small	Fresco	4:12
15.	"Renaissance"	Pickering, Heard	Elegant Slumming	3:51
16.	"Love Rendezvous"	Pickering, Heard	Bizarre Fruit	3:48

== Charts ==
=== Weekly charts ===
Chart (1998)	Peak position
Austrian Albums (Ö3 Austria)	27
Belgian Albums (Ultratop Flanders)	41
Finnish Albums (Suomen virallinen lista)	34
German Albums (Offizielle Top 100)	20
New Zealand Albums (RMNZ)	21
Norwegian Albums (VG-lista)	2
Scottish Albums (OCC)	2
Swiss Albums (Schweizer Hitparade)	39
UK Albums (OCC)	2

=== Year-end charts ===
Chart (1998)	Position
UK Albums (OCC)	12
Chart (1999)	Position
UK Albums (OCC)	72

== Certifications ==
Region	Certification	Certified units/sales
United Kingdom (BPI)	3× Platinum	900,000^{^}
Summaries
Europe (IFPI)	Platinum	1,000,000^{*}
^{*} Sales figures based on certification alone.^{^} Shipments figures based on certification alone.
