= List of UK top-ten singles in 1993 =

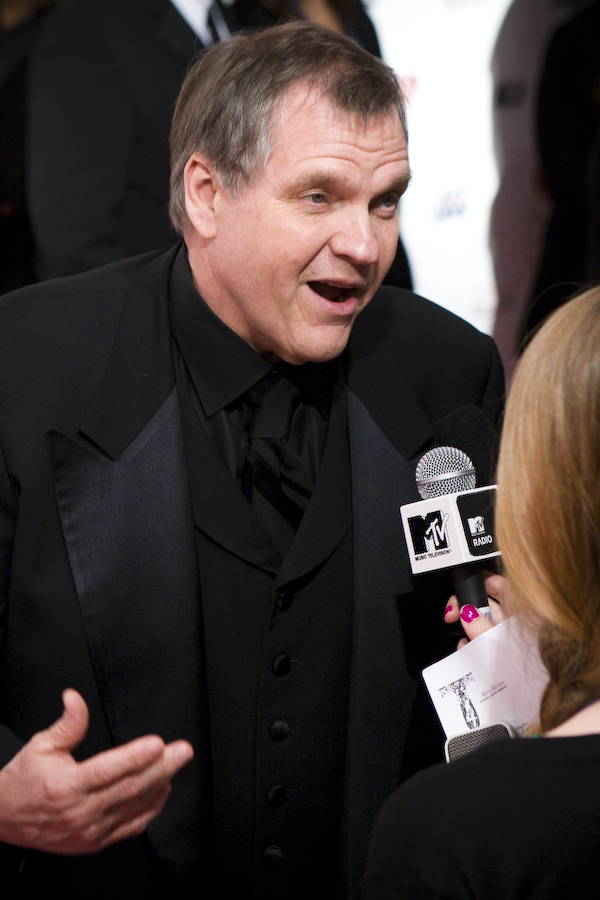
Meat Loaf (pictured in 2009) had the best-selling single of 1993 with "I'd Do Anything for Love (But I Won't Do That)", which spent fourteen weeks in the top 10, including seven weeks at number-one.

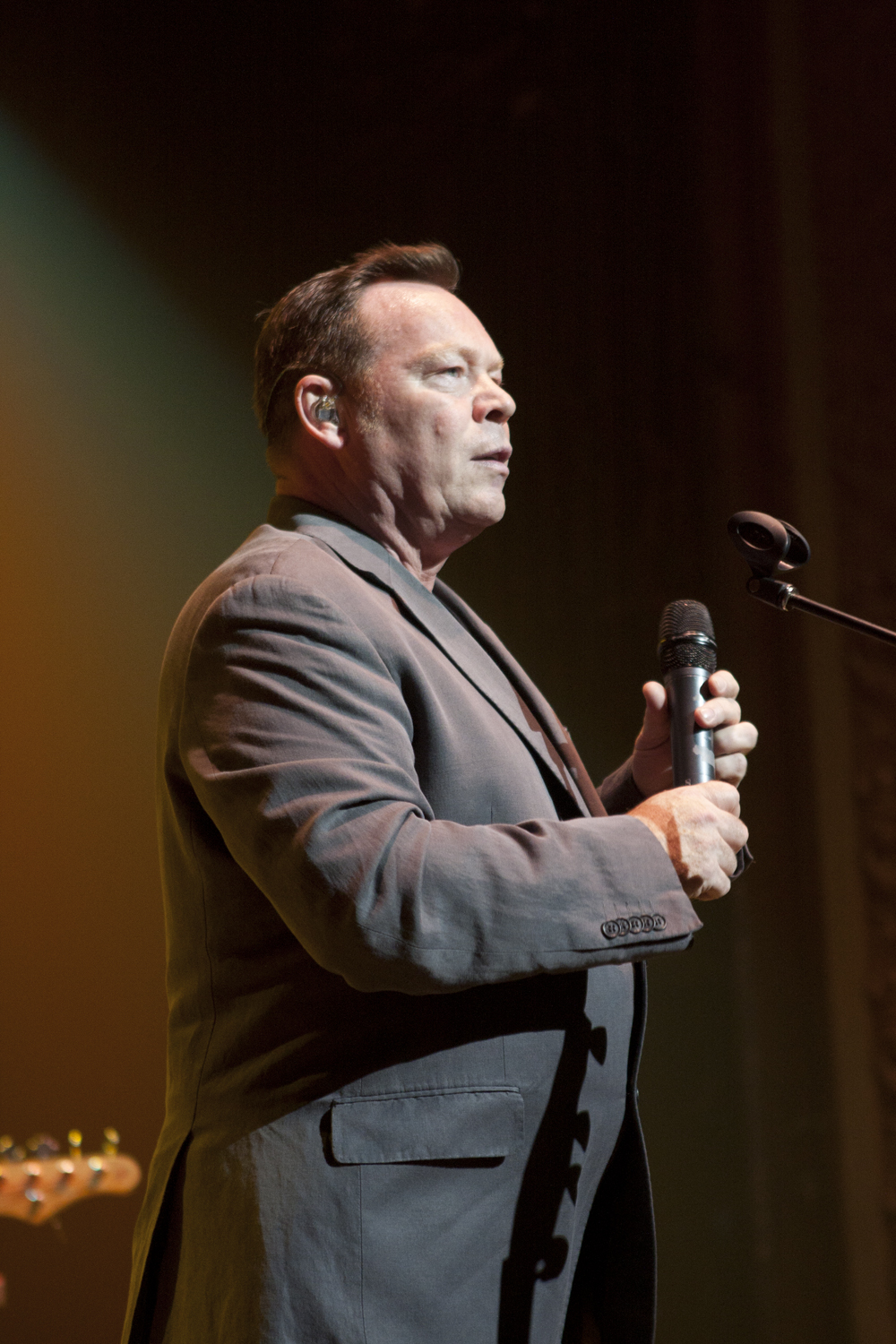
Ali Campbell (pictured in 2012) and his band UB40 went to number-one in June with their version of "Can't Help Falling in Love", which featured on the soundtrack of the movie Sliver. It became the year's second best selling single in the UK.

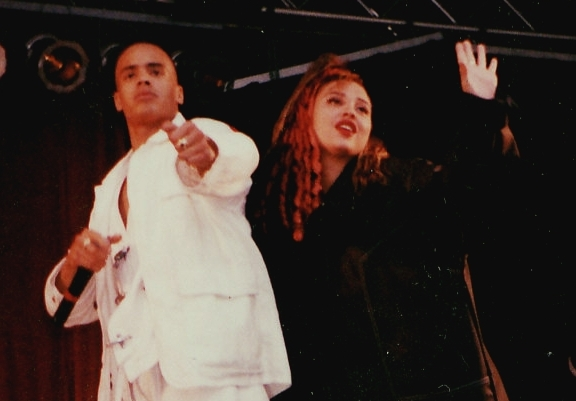
Dutch-Belgian dance group 2 Unlimited achieved three UK top 10 singles in 1993, including their only number-one hit, "No Limit", which became the UK's fourth best seller of the year.

The UK Singles Chart is one of many music charts compiled by the Official Charts Company that calculates the best-selling singles of the week in the United Kingdom. Before 2004, the chart was only based on the sales of physical singles. This list shows singles that peaked in the Top 10 of the UK Singles Chart during 1993, as well as singles which peaked in 1992 and 1994 but were in the top 10 in 1993. The entry date is when the single appeared in the top 10 for the first time (week ending, as published by the Official Charts Company, which is six days after the chart is announced).

One-hundred and thirty-six singles were in the top ten in 1993. Ten singles from 1992 remained in the top 10 for several weeks at the beginning of the year, while "Twist and Shout" by Chaka Demus & Pliers, "The Perfect Year" by Dina Carroll and "It's Alright" by East 17 were all released in 1993 but did not reach their peak until 1994. "Could It Be Magic" by Take That was the only single from 1992 to reach its peak in 1993. Thirty-one artists scored multiple entries in the top 10 in 1993. Ace of Base, Eternal, Gabrielle, Radiohead and Shaggy were among the many artists who achieved their first UK charting top 10 single in 1993.

The 1992 Christmas number-one, "I Will Always Love You" by Whitney Houston, remained at number-one for the first six weeks of 1993. The first new number-one single of the year was "No Limit" by 2 Unlimited. Overall, fifteen different singles peaked at number-one in 1993, with Take That (3) having the most singles hit that position.

== Background ==
=== Multiple entries ===
One-hundred and thirty-six singles charted in the top 10 in 1993, with one-hundred and twenty-four singles reaching their peak this year.

Thirty-one artists scored multiple entries in the top 10 in 1993. Boyband Take That secured the record for the most top ten singles in 1993 with five hit singles. This included three number-one singles: "Pray" in July, "Relight My Fire" in October and "Babe" in December. "Why Can't I Wake Up With You" and "Could It Be Magic?" just missed out on number-one, peaking at numbers 2 and 3 respectively. Fellow Manchester band M People had four top ten entries, with the highest entry, "Moving on Up", reaching number 2. "No Limit" was a number-one single for 2 Unlimited, one of three top 10 singles for the Dutch eurodance group. Chaka Demus & Pliers, Lisa Stansfield, Madonna, Michael Jackson and Whitney Houston all had three top 10 singles in 1993, with Houston's cover of "I Will Always Love You" (from The Bodyguard film soundtrack) spending 10 weeks at number one.

=== Chart debuts ===
Forty-three artists achieved their first top 10 single in 1993, either as a lead or featured artist. Of these, seven went on to record another hit single that year: Cappella, Culture Beat, Gabrielle, Haddaway, Niki Haris, Shabba Ranks and Urban Cookie Collective. Chaka Demus & Pliers achieved two more top 10 singles in 1993. M People had three other entries in their breakthrough year.

The following table (collapsed on desktop site) does not include acts who had previously charted as part of a group and secured their first top 10 solo single.

Artist	Number of top 10s	First entry	Chart position	Other entries
Niki Haris	2	"Exterminate"	2	"Do You See the Light (Looking For)" (10)
Pop Will Eat Itself	1	"Get the Girl! Kill the Baddies!"	9	—
West End	1	"The Love I Lost"	3	—
U.S.U.R.A.	1	"Open Your Mind"	7	—
The Beloved	1	"Sweet Harmony"	8	—
M People	4	"How Can I Love You More?"	8	"One Night in Heaven" (6), "Moving on Up" (2), "Don't Look Any Further" (9)
Lenny Kravitz	1	"Are You Gonna Go My Way"	4	—
Shaggy	1	"Oh Carolina"	1	—
Suede	1	"Animal Nitrate"	7	—
Shabba Ranks	2	"Mr. Loverman"	3	"Housecall" (8)
Snow	1	"Informer"	2	—
Therapy?	1	"ShortSharpShock (EP)"	9	—
Jamiroquai	1	"Too Young to Die"	10	—
Robin S.	1	"Show Me Love"	6	—
Jade	1	"Don't Walk Away"	7	—
Sub Sub	1	"Ain't No Love (Ain't No Use)"	3	—
Melanie Williams	1	"Ain't No Love (Ain't No Use)"	3	—
Cappella	2	"U Got 2 Know"	6	"U Got 2 Let the Music" (2)
Ace of Base	1	"All That She Wants"	1	—
Inner Circle	1	"Sweat (A La La La La Long)"	3	—
House of Pain	1	"Jump Around"/"Top O' the Morning to Ya"	8	—
Spin Doctors	1	"Two Princes"	3	—
Green Jellÿ	1	"Three Little Pigs"	5	—
Louchie Lou & Michie One	1	"Shout (It Out)"	7	—
Haddaway	2	"What Is Love"	2	"Life" (6)
Gabrielle	2	"Dreams"	1	"Going Nowhere" (9)
Chaka Demus & Pliers	3	"Tease Me"	3	"She Don't Let Nobody" (4), "Twist and Shout" (1) ^{[A]}
4 Non Blondes	1	"What's Up?"	2	—
Urban Cookie Collective	2	"The Key the Secret"	2	"Feels Like Heaven" (5)
Bitty McLean	1	"It Keeps Rainin' (Tears from My Eyes)"	2	—
Apache Indian	1	"Nuff Vibes (EP)"	5	—
Culture Beat	2	"Mr. Vain"	1	"Got to Get It" (4)
SWV	1	"Right Here"	3	—
Radiohead	1	"Creep"	7	—
Eternal	1	"Stay"	4	—
The Goodmen	1	"Give It Up"	5	—
The Time Frequency	1	"Real Love '93"	8	—
Soul Asylum	1	"Runaway Train"	7	—
The Doobie Brothers	1	"Long Train Runnin'"	7	—
Mr Blobby	1	"Mr Blobby"	1	—
Jack Radics	1	"Twist and Shout" ^{[A]}	1	—
Taxi Gang	1	"Twist and Shout" ^{[A]}	1	—

Notes

Slash from the American rock band Guns N' Roses featured on Michael Jackson's number 2 single "Give In to Me", his first hit outside the band.

The Right Said Fred-fronted Comic Relief single "Stick It Out" included a collection of entertainment personalities credited as and Friends. Among them were chart debutants comedians Clive Anderson, Hugh Laurie, Peter Cook and Steve Coogan, radio DJ Alan Freeman, television presenter Jools Holland, actors Bernard Cribbins, Linda Robson and Pauline Quirke and children's character Basil Brush (voiced by Ivan Owen).

=== Songs from films ===
Original songs from various films entered the top 10 throughout the year. These included "I'm Every Woman", "I Have Nothing", "I Will Always Love You" (entered in 1992) and "Someday (I'm Coming Back)" (from The Bodyguard), "Love Song for a Vampire" (Bram Stoker's Dracula), "Can't Help Falling In Love" (Sliver), "Almost Unreal" (Super Mario Bros.), "In All the Right Places" (Indecent Proposal), "Will You Be There" (Free Willy), "Hero" (Hero) and "Again" (Poetic Justice).

=== Charity singles ===
The Comic Relief single in 1993, "Stick It Out", was performed by Right Said Fred with the help of a group of entertainment personalities on backing vocals. The single featured Alan Freeman, Basil Brush, Bernard Cribbins, Clive Anderson, Hugh Laurie, Jools Holland, Linda Robson, Pauline Quirke, Peter Cook and Steve Coogan. It peaked at number four on 20 March 1993 (week ending).

=== Best-selling singles ===
Meat Loaf had the best-selling single of the year with "I'd Do Anything for Love (But I Won't Do That)", which spent fourteen weeks in the top 10 (including seven weeks at number-one), sold over 761,000 copies and was certified platinum by the BPI. "(I Can't Help) Falling in Love with You" by UB40 came in second place. Ace of Base's "All That She Wants", "No Limit" from 2 Unlimited and "Dreams by Gabrielle made up the top five. Singles by Mr Blobby, Shaggy, Haddaway, Culture Beat and Whitney Houston were also in the top ten best-selling singles of the year.

== Top-ten singles ==
Key

Symbol	Meaning
‡	Single peaked in 1992 but still in chart in 1993.
♦	Single released in 1993 but peaked in 1994.
(#)	Year-end top-ten single position and rank
Entered	The date that the single first appeared in the chart.
Peak	Highest position that the single reached in the UK Singles Chart.

Entered (week ending)	Weeks in top 10	Single	Artist	Peak	Peak reached (week ending)	Weeks at peak
Singles in 1992
14 November 1992	10	"Would I Lie to You?" ‡	Charles & Eddie	1	21 November 1992	2
21 November 1992	15	"I Will Always Love You" ‡ (#10)	Whitney Houston	1	5 December 1992	10
28 November 1992	3	"Out of Space"/"Ruff in the Jungle Bizness" ‡ ^{[B]}	The Prodigy	5	5 December 1992	1
5 December 1992	7	"Heal the World" ‡	Michael Jackson	2	12 December 1992	5
5 December 1992	5	"Tom Traubert's Blues (Waltzing Matilda)" ‡	Rod Stewart	6	12 December 1992	1
12 December 1992	5	"Slam Jam" ‡	WWF Superstars	4	12 December 1992	2
12 December 1992	8	"Could It Be Magic"	Take That	3	9 January 1993	2
19 December 1992	5	"Phorever People" ‡	The Shamen	5	26 December 1992	2
19 December 1992	3	"Boney M. Megamix II" ‡	Boney M	7	26 December 1992	1
26 December 1992	3	"Miami Hit Mix" ‡	Gloria Estefan	8	26 December 1992	2
Singles in 1993
2 January 1993	1	"Someday (I'm Coming Back)"	Lisa Stansfield	10	2 January 1993	1
9 January 1993	6	"Exterminate!"	Snap! featuring Niki Haris	2	16 January 1993	3
9 January 1993	4	"Mr. Wendal"/"Revolution"	Arrested Development	4	16 January 1993	1
16 January 1993	3	"I'm Easy"/"Be Aggressive"	Faith No More	3	23 January 1993	1
16 January 1993	1	"Get the Girl! Kill the Baddies!"	Pop Will Eat Itself	9	16 January 1993	1
16 January 1993	1	"The Devil You Know"	Jesus Jones	10	16 January 1993	1
23 January 1993	6	"The Love I Lost"	West End featuring Sybil	3	30 January 1993	2
23 January 1993	3	"We Are Family ('93 Mixes)" ^{[C]}	Sister Sledge	5	30 January 1993	1
23 January 1993	3	"Open Your Mind"	U.S.U.R.A.	7	30 January 1993	2
23 January 1993	3	"Sweet Harmony"	The Beloved	8	30 January 1993	2
23 January 1993	1	"Steam"	Peter Gabriel	10	23 January 1993	1
30 January 1993	12	"No Limit" (#4)	2 Unlimited	1	13 February 1993	5
6 February 1993	5	"Deep"	East 17	5	6 February 1993	2
6 February 1993	3	"Ordinary World"	Duran Duran	6	6 February 1993	2
6 February 1993	3	"How Can I Love You More?" ^{[D]}	M People	8	13 February 1993	1
13 February 1993	6	"Little Bird"/"Love Song for a Vampire"	Annie Lennox	3	13 February 1993	4
13 February 1993	2	"Stairway to Heaven"	Rolf Harris	7	20 February 1993	1
20 February 1993	3	"Why Can't I Wake Up with You"	Take That	2	20 February 1993	2
20 February 1993	4	"I'm Every Woman"	Whitney Houston	4	27 February 1993	1
27 February 1993	5	"Are You Gonna Go My Way"	Lenny Kravitz	4	6 March 1993	2
27 February 1993	5	"Give In to Me"	Michael Jackson	2	6 March 1993	1
27 February 1993	2	"I Feel You"	Depeche Mode	8	27 February 1993	1
6 March 1993	8	"Oh Carolina" (#7)	Shaggy	1	20 March 1993	2
6 March 1993	2	"Animal Nitrate"	Suede	7	6 March 1993	2
13 March 1993	1	"Fear of the Dark (Live)"	Iron Maiden	8	13 March 1993	1
13 March 1993	2	"Stick It Out" ^{[E]}	Right Said Fred & Friends ^{[F]}	4	20 March 1993	1
13 March 1993	1	"Bad Girl"	Madonna	10	13 March 1993	1
20 March 1993	5	"Mr. Loverman" ^{[G]}	Shabba Ranks	3	20 March 1993	2
20 March 1993	9	"Informer"	Snow	2	27 March 1993	3
20 March 1993	1	"ShortSharpShock (EP)"	Therapy?	9	20 March 1993	1
20 March 1993	1	"Too Young to Die"	Jamiroquai	10	20 March 1993	1
27 March 1993	7	"Young at Heart" ^{[H]}	The Bluebells	1	3 April 1993	4
27 March 1993	2	"Cat's in the Cradle"	Ugly Kid Joe	7	27 March 1993	2
27 March 1993	1	"Peace in Our Time"	Cliff Richard	8	27 March 1993	1
27 March 1993	2	"Jump They Say"	David Bowie	9	3 April 1993	1
3 April 1993	2	"Fever"	Madonna	6	3 April 1993	1
3 April 1993	5	"When I'm Good and Ready"	Sybil	5	10 April 1993	3
3 April 1993	5	"Show Me Love"	Robin S.	6	10 April 1993	2
10 April 1993	3	"Don't Walk Away"	Jade	7	24 April 1993	1
10 April 1993	6	"Ain't No Love (Ain't No Use)"	Sub Sub featuring Melanie Williams	3	24 April 1993	1
17 April 1993	3	"U Got 2 Know"	Cappella	6	24 April 1993	2
24 April 1993	2	"Regret"	New Order	4	24 April 1993	1
24 April 1993	4	"I Have Nothing"	Whitney Houston	3	1 May 1993	2
1 May 1993	6	"Five Live (EP)"	George Michael & Queen with Lisa Stansfield	1	1 May 1993	3
1 May 1993	6	"Everybody Hurts"	R.E.M.	7	15 May 1993	2
8 May 1993	5	"That's the Way Love Goes"	Janet Jackson	2	8 May 1993	1
8 May 1993	5	"Tribal Dance"	2 Unlimited	4	8 May 1993	2
8 May 1993	10	"All That She Wants" (#3)	Ace of Base	1	22 May 1993	3
8 May 1993	8	"Sweat (A La La La La Long)" ^{[I]}	Inner Circle	3	22 May 1993	3
15 May 1993	2	"Believe in Me"	Utah Saints	8	15 May 1993	1
22 May 1993	10	"(I Can't Help) Falling in Love with You" (#2)	UB40	1	12 June 1993	2
22 May 1993	1	"Housecall" ^{[J]}	Shabba Ranks featuring Maxi Priest	8	22 May 1993	1
22 May 1993	2	"In These Arms"	Bon Jovi	9	22 May 1993	2
29 May 1993	2	"I Don't Wanna Fight"	Tina Turner	7	29 May 1993	1
29 May 1993	1	"Jump Around"/"Top O' the Morning to Ya"	House of Pain	8	29 May 1993	1
5 June 1993	6	"Two Princes"	Spin Doctors	3	12 June 1993	1
5 June 1993	3	"Three Little Pigs"	Green Jellÿ	5	5 June 1993	2
5 June 1993	2	"Shout (It Out)"	Louchie Lou & Michie One	7	5 June 1993	1
12 June 1993	9	"What Is Love" (#8)	Haddaway	2	3 July 1993	2
12 June 1993	2	"Can You Forgive Her?"	Pet Shop Boys	7	12 June 1993	2
12 June 1993	4	"In All the Right Places"	Lisa Stansfield	8	26 June 1993	1
12 June 1993	1	"Do You See the Light (Looking For)"	Snap! featuring Niki Haris	10	12 June 1993	1
19 June 1993	9	"Dreams" (#5)	Gabrielle	1	26 June 1993	3
19 June 1993	10	"Tease Me"	Chaka Demus & Pliers	3	10 July 1993	1
26 June 1993	4	"Have I Told You Lately"	Rod Stewart	5	3 July 1993	1
26 June 1993	6	"One Night in Heaven"	M People	6	17 July 1993	2
3 July 1993	3	"I Will Survive (Phil Kelsey Remix)" ^{[K]}	Gloria Gaynor	5	10 July 1993	1
10 July 1993	8	"What's Up?"	4 Non Blondes	2	24 July 1993	2
17 July 1993	6	"Pray"	Take That	1	17 July 1993	4
17 July 1993	2	"Will You Be There"	Michael Jackson	9	17 July 1993	2
24 July 1993	2	"Almost Unreal"	Roxette	7	24 July 1993	1
31 July 1993	7	"Living on My Own (No More Brothers' Mix)" ^{[L]}	Freddie Mercury	1	14 August 1993	2
31 July 1993	3	"Rain"	Madonna	7	31 July 1993	2
31 July 1993	2	"This Is It"	Dannii Minogue	10	31 July 1993	2
7 August 1993	6	"The Key the Secret"	Urban Cookie Collective	2	14 August 1993	2
14 August 1993	7	"It Keeps Rainin' (Tears from My Eyes)"	Bitty McLean	2	4 September 1993	2
14 August 1993	6	"The River of Dreams"	Billy Joel	3	4 September 1993	1
14 August 1993	5	"Nuff Vibes (EP)"	Apache Indian	5	21 August 1993	1
21 August 1993	8	"Mr. Vain" (#9)	Culture Beat	1	28 August 1993	4
21 August 1993	3	"Higher Ground"	UB40	8	21 August 1993	3
28 August 1993	6	"Right Here"	SWV	3	11 September 1993	1
28 August 1993	4	"Dreamlover"	Mariah Carey	9	4 September 1993	1
4 September 1993	3	"Faces"	2 Unlimited	8	11 September 1993	2
11 September 1993	2	"Heart-Shaped Box"	Nirvana	5	11 September 1993	1
18 September 1993	5	"Go West"	Pet Shop Boys	2	18 September 1993	2
18 September 1993	8	"Boom! Shake the Room"	DJ Jazzy Jeff & The Fresh Prince	1	25 September 1993	2
18 September 1993	1	"Creep"	Radiohead	7	18 September 1993	1
25 September 1993	5	"Moving on Up"	M People	2	2 October 1993	1
25 September 1993	5	"She Don't Let Nobody"	Chaka Demus & Pliers	4	2 October 1993	3
25 September 1993	5	"Life"	Haddaway	6	9 October 1993	1
25 September 1993	1	"Condemnation (EP)"	Depeche Mode	9	25 September 1993	1
25 September 1993	1	"On the Ropes (EP)"	The Wonder Stuff	10	25 September 1993	1
2 October 1993	3	"Relax" ^{[M]}	Frankie Goes to Hollywood	5	9 October 1993	1
2 October 1993	1	"Going Nowhere"	Gabrielle	9	2 October 1993	1
2 October 1993	1	"It Must Have Been Love" ^{[N]}	Roxette	10	2 October 1993	1
9 October 1993	4	"Relight My Fire"	Take That featuring Lulu	1	9 October 1993	2
9 October 1993	14	"I'd Do Anything for Love (But I Won't Do That)" (#1)	Meat Loaf	1	23 October 1993	7
9 October 1993	5	"Stay"	Eternal	4	23 October 1993	1
16 October 1993	1	"Hallowed Be Thy Name"	Iron Maiden	9	16 October 1993	1
23 October 1993	5	"U Got 2 Let the Music"	Cappella	2	30 October 1993	1
23 October 1993	2	"One Love"	The Prodigy	8	23 October 1993	1
23 October 1993	9	"Don't Be a Stranger"	Dina Carroll	3	13 November 1993	2
30 October 1993	8	"Please Forgive Me"	Bryan Adams	2	6 November 1993	3
30 October 1993	2	"Both Sides of the Story"	Phil Collins	7	30 October 1993	1
30 October 1993	4	"Give It Up"	The Goodmen	5	6 November 1993	1
6 November 1993	4	"Got to Get It"	Culture Beat	4	13 November 1993	2
6 November 1993	3	"Hero" ^{[O]}	Mariah Carey	7	13 November 1993	1
13 November 1993	1	"Real Love '93"	The Time Frequency	8	13 November 1993	1
13 November 1993	3	"Feels Like Heaven"	Urban Cookie Collective	5	20 November 1993	1
13 November 1993	1	"Little Fluffy Clouds" ^{[P]}	The Orb	10	13 November 1993	1
20 November 1993	3	"Runaway Train"	Soul Asylum	7	20 November 1993	2
20 November 1993	7	"True Love"	Elton John & Kiki Dee	2	27 November 1993	2
20 November 1993	1	"Ain't It Fun"	Guns N' Roses	9	20 November 1993	1
27 November 1993	3	"Again"	Janet Jackson	6	27 November 1993	1
27 November 1993	2	"Long Train Runnin' (Remix)" ^{[Q]}	The Doobie Brothers	7	4 December 1993	1
4 December 1993	7	"Mr Blobby" (#6) ^{[R]}	Mr Blobby	1	11 December 1993	3
4 December 1993	2	"Stay (Faraway, So Close!)"/"I've Got You Under My Skin" ^{[S]}	U2/Frank Sinatra with Bono ^{[T]}	4	11 December 1993	1
4 December 1993	1	"Don't Look Any Further"	M People	9	4 December 1993	1
11 December 1993	1	"Controversy"	Prince	5	11 December 1993	1
11 December 1993	6	"For Whom the Bell Tolls"	Bee Gees	4	25 December 1993	2
11 December 1993	7	"It's Alright" ♦	East 17	3	15 January 1994	1
18 December 1993	5	"Babe"	Take That	1	18 December 1993	1
18 December 1993	7	"Twist and Shout" ♦	Chaka Demus & Pliers featuring Jack Radics & Taxi Gang	1	8 January 1994	2
18 December 1993	5	"The Perfect Year" ♦	Dina Carroll	5	8 January 1994	1
25 December 1993	3	"Bat Out of Hell" ^{[U]}	Meat Loaf	8	25 December 1993	2
25 December 1993	1	"The Power of Love" ^{[V]}	Frankie Goes to Hollywood	10	25 December 1993	1

== Entries by artist ==
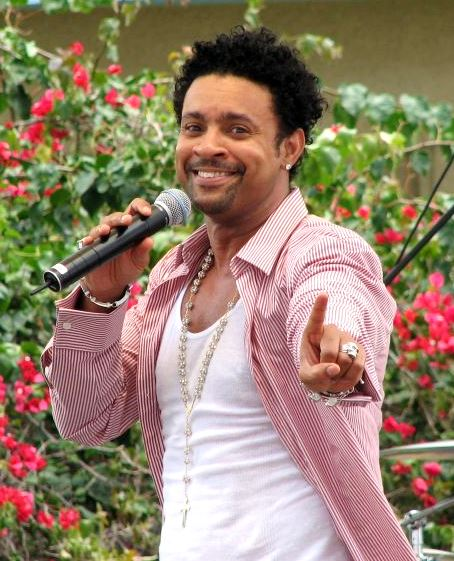
Jamaican reggae musician Shaggy made his UK chart debut this year with "Oh Carolina", which spent two weeks at number-one.

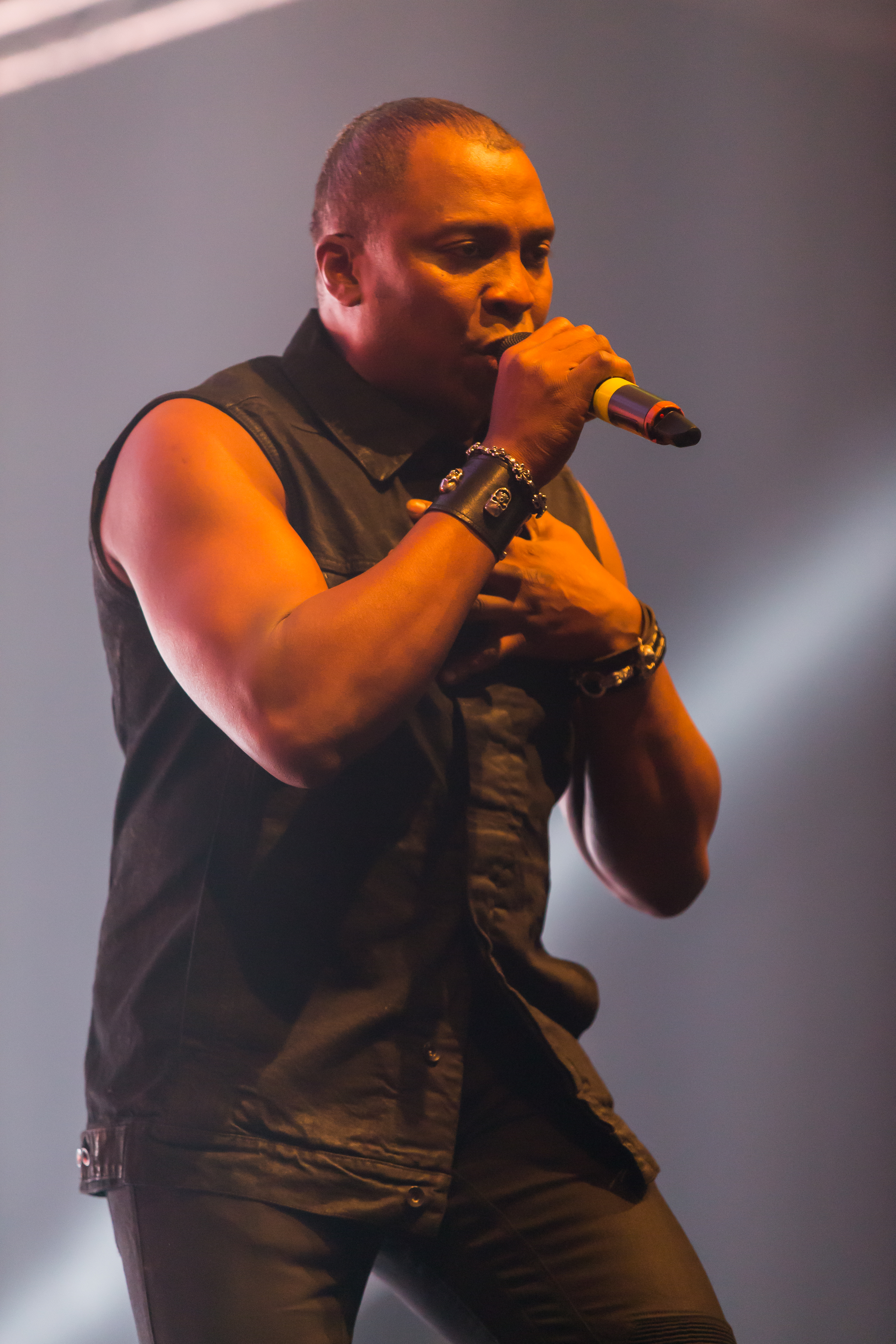
Trinidadian-German Eurodance artist Haddaway achieved two top 10 singles in 1993, including his signature song, "What is Love", which lasted nine weeks in the top 10, peaking at number two.

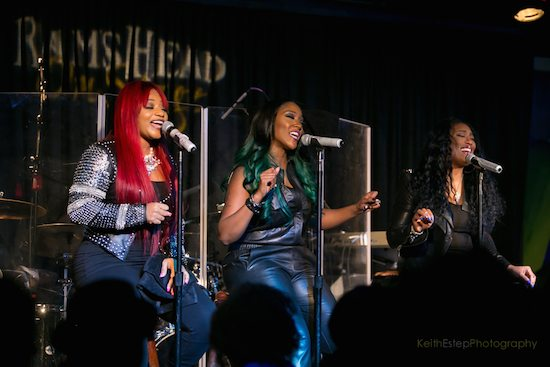
US R&B trio SWV (pictured in 2018) secured their only UK top 10 hit this year with "Right Here", which lasted six weeks in the top 10, peaking at number three.

The following table shows artists who achieved two or more top 10 entries in 1993, including singles that reached their peak in 1992 or 1994. The figures include both main artists and featured artists, while appearances on ensemble charity records are also counted for each artist.

Entries	Artist	Weeks	Singles
5	Take That ^{[W]}	20	"Babe", "Could It Be Magic", "Pray", "Relight My Fire", "Why Can't I Wake Up with You"
4	M People	15	"Don't Look Any Further", "How Can I Love You More?", "Moving On Up", "One Night in Heaven"
3	2 Unlimited	20	"Faces", "No Limit", "Tribal Dance"
3	Chaka Demus & Pliers ^{[X]}	17	"She Don't Let Nobody", "Tease Me", "Twist and Shout"
3	Lisa Stansfield	11	"Five Live (EP)", "In All the Right Places", "Someday (I'm Coming Back)"
3	Madonna	6	"Bad Girl", "Fever", "Rain"
3	Michael Jackson ^{[Y]}	10	"Give in to Me", "Heal the World", "Will You Be There"
3	Whitney Houston ^{[Y]}	17	"I Have Nothing", "I'm Every Woman", "I Will Always Love You"
2	Cappella	8	"U Got 2 Know", "U Got 2 Let the Music"
2	Culture Beat	12	"Got to Get It", "Mr. Vain"
2	Depeche Mode	3	"Condemnation (EP)", "I Feel You"
2	Dina Carroll ^{[X]}	11	"Don't Be a Stranger", "The Perfect Year"
2	East 17 ^{[X]}	8	"Deep", "It's Alright"
2	Frankie Goes to Hollywood	4	"Relax", "The Power of Love"
2	Freddie Mercury ^{[Z]}	13	"Five Live (EP)", "Living on My Own (No More Brothers' Mix)"
2	Gabrielle	10	"Dreams", "Going Nowhere"
2	Haddaway	14	"Life", "What Is Love"
2	Iron Maiden	2	"Fear of the Dark", "Hallowed Be Thy Name"
2	Janet Jackson	8	"Again", "That's the Way Love Goes"
2	Mariah Carey	7	"Dreamlover", "Hero"
2	Meat Loaf	13	"Bat Out of Hell", "I'd Do Anything for Love (But I Won't Do That)"
2	Niki Haris ^{[AA]}	7	"Exterminate!", "Do You See the Light (Looking For)"
2	Pet Shop Boys	7	"Can You Forgive Her?", "Go West"
2	The Prodigy ^{[Y]}	3	"One Love", "Out of Space"/"Ruff in the Jungle Bizness"
2	Rod Stewart ^{[Y]}	5	"Have I Told You Lately", "Tom Traubert's Blues"/"Waltzing Matilda"
2	Shabba Ranks	6	"Housecall", "Mr. Loverman"
2	Snap!	7	"Exterminate!", "Do You See the Light (Looking For)"
2	Sybil ^{[BB]}	11	"The Love I Lost", "When I'm Good and Ready"
2	UB40	13	"Higher Ground", "(I Can't Help) Falling in Love with You"
2	Urban Cookie Collective	9	"Feels Like Heaven", "The Key the Secret"

== See also ==
- 1993 in British music
- List of number-one singles from the 1990s (UK)

== Notes ==
- ^{a} "Twist and Shout" reached its peak of number-one on 8 January 1994 (week ending).
- ^{b} "Out of Space"/"Ruff in the Jungle Bizness" re-entered the top 10 at number 9 on 9 January 1993 (week ending).
- ^{c} "We Are Family" originally peaked at number 8 upon its initial release in 1979. It was also re-released in 1984 but failed to reach the top 10, peaking at number 33. It was re-released in a remix version in 1993.
- ^{d} "How Can I Love You More?" originally peaked outside the top ten at number 29 upon its initial release in 1991.
- ^{e} Released as the official single for Comic Relief.
- ^{f} "Stick It Out" was performed by Right Said Fred, alongside a group of entertainers as Friends including Hugh Laurie, Peter Cook, Alan Freeman, Jools Holland, Steve Coogan, Clive Anderson, Pauline Quirke, Linda Robson, Basil Brush and Bernard Cribbins.
- ^{g} "Mr Loverman" originally peaked outside the top ten at number 23 upon its initial release in 1992.
- ^{h} "Young at Heart" originally peaked at number 8 upon its initial release in 1984.
- ^{i} "Sweat (La La La La Long)" originally peaked outside the top ten at number 43 upon its initial release in 1992.
- ^{j} "Housecall" originally peaked outside the top ten at number 31 upon its initial release in 1991.
- ^{k} "I Will Survive" originally peaked at number-one upon its initial release in 1979. It was released as a remix in a similar way to "We Are Family" in 1993.
- ^{l} The original version of "Living on My Own" peaked outside the top ten at number 50 upon its release in 1985.
- ^{m} "Relax" originally peaked at number-one upon its initial release in 1983. It was one of a number of Frankie Goes to Hollywood songs which were re-issued in 1993.
- ^{n} "It Must Have Been Love" originally peaked at number 3 upon its initial release in 1990.
- ^{o} "Hero" re-entered the top 10 at number 9 on 27 November 1993 (week ending).
- ^{p} "Little Fluffy Clouds" originally peaked outside the top ten at number 87 upon its initial release in 1990.
- ^{q} "Long Train Runnin'" was first released in 1973 but did not chart in the UK. It was re-released in 1993 with a new remix.
- ^{r} Mr Blobby was a character from the television variety series Noel's House Party, played by Barry Killerby. The self-titled novelty song became the Christmas number-one single for 1993.
- ^{s} "I've Got You Under My Skin" was recorded as a duet by Frank Sinatra and Bono from U2, for the album Duets. It was released as a double-A side single alongside "Stay (Faraway, So Close!)", performed by Bono and the rest of U2.
- ^{t} Frank Sinatra only appeared on "I Got You Under My Skin" on the double-A side, with Bono featuring on both, the other single with his bandmates.
- ^{u} "Bat Out of Hell" originally peaked outside the top ten at number 15 upon its initial release in 1979.
- ^{v} "The Power of Love" originally peaked at number-one upon its initial release in 1984. It was one of a number of Frankie Goes to Hollywood songs which were re-issued in 1993.
- ^{w} Figure includes single that first charted in 1992 but peaked in 1993.
- ^{x} Figure includes single that peaked in 1994.
- ^{y} Figure includes single that peaked in 1992.
- ^{z} Figure includes a top 10 hit with the group Queen.
- ^{aa} Figure includes appearances on Snap!'s "Exterminate!" and "Do You See the Light (Looking For)".
- ^{bb} Figure includes appearance on West End's "The Love I Lost".
