= Elegant Slumming =

Studio album by M People
- Released: 4 October 1993
- Recorded: January – May 1993
- Studio: Milo, London; Roundhouse, London; Strongroom, London
- Genre: House; dance-pop
- Length: 55:04
- Label: Deconstruction
- Producer: M People

M People chronology
Northern Soul (1992)	Elegant Slumming (1993)	Bizarre Fruit (1994)

Singles from Elegant Slumming
- 1. "One Night in Heaven" Released: 14 June 1993; 2. "Moving On Up" Released: 13 September 1993; 3. "Don't Look Any Further" Released: 22 November 1993; 4. "Renaissance" Released: 28 February 1994

Professional ratings
Initial reviews (in 1993/1994)
Review scores
Source	Rating
Billboard	(favorable)
Entertainment Weekly	A
The Independent	(favorable)
Music Week	4/5 stars
NME	7/10
The Observer	(favorable)
Smash Hits	4/5 stars
Spin	(favorable)
The Village Voice	A

Professional ratings
Retrospective reviews (after 1994)
Review scores
Source	Rating
AllMusic	4.5/5 stars
Encyclopedia of Popular Music	4/5 stars

Elegant Slumming is the second album by the British dance band M People. It was released on 4 October 1993 charting and peaking at number 2 on the UK Album Chart and spent 87 weeks in the Top 75. It re-entered the chart three times in October 1996 and March and September 1997. Its overall sales stand at 759,000 as of September 2020.

The four singles released from the album were all UK Top 10 hits: "One Night in Heaven" (#6) and "Moving On Up" (#2), as well as a cover version of the Dennis Edwards and Siedah Garrett song "Don't Look Any Further", which reached No. 9 in the UK. A fourth hit, "Renaissance", reached No. 5 in the same chart.

The US version was released in 1994 in a separate deal on the Epic label, and replaces 3 tracks with 3 hits from their debut album Northern Soul, which did not have a US release. The album was well received, and "One Night in Heaven" and "Moving On Up" were Billboard No. 1 hits on Hot Dance Club Play.

The original British album won the 1994 UK Mercury Music Prize.

== Critical reception ==
The album was met with positive reviews from most music critics. Billboard magazine complimented it as "a sterling collection that is a delicious blend of cutting-edge club rhythms and classic pop/soul hooks." They praised Heather Small as "a formidable front woman who rises above the pack of iron-lunged divas with a well-rounded range and a regal grace. She exudes the ingredients necessary for major stardom on dandy ditties like 'One Night in Heaven', 'Colour My Life', and 'Moving On Up'". Alan Jones from Music Week named the album Pick of the Week, remarking that Small is "in commanding vocal form", while the band provide her "with infectious and real (no sampled) pads over which to strut her impressive stuff."

Iestyn George from NME wrote, "Everything, from the artwork onwards, is presented with flawless precision, blending Italia-house with breakbeats and subtle touches of latin percussion. Pickering's encyclopedic knowledge of music and priceless apprenticeship at the Hacienda are matched by Heather Small's mother-of-all vocals." Pete Stanton from Smash Hits named it Best New Album, adding, "If 'One Night in Heaven' had you wiggling then this album's your baby. 'Moving On Up' is a funky dancefloor filler and 'La Vida Loca' could make your cucumber rumba." Jonathan Bernstein from Spin said, "Don't wrinkle your nose in that unbecoming fashion. That stench to which you're so unused is called class and these U.K. clubland monarchs just reek of it." Music critic of The Village Voice, Robert Christgau gave the album an A.

== Track listing ==
All songs written by Mike Pickering and Paul Heard except where noted.

No.	Title	Writer(s)	Length
1.	"One Night in Heaven"		6:28
2.	"Moving On Up"		5:29
3.	"Renaissance"		5:20
4.	"You Just Have to Be There"		5:26
5.	"Love Is in My Soul"		6:15
6.	"Don't Look Any Further"	Franne Golde, Dennis Lambert, Duane Hitchings	5:28
7.	"Natural Thing"		5:04
8.	"Little Packet"		5:19
9.	"La Vida Loca"		4:32
10.	"Melody of Life"		4:44
Total length:			55:04

2005 re-release bonus tracks
No.	Title	Writer(s)	Length
11.	"Don't Look Any Further" (Danny D Mix)	Golde, Lambert, Hitchings	5:36
12.	"Renaissance" (John Digweed's Full on Mix)		7:57
13.	"Moving On Up" (Roger S Moving Mix)		6:28

=== US CD and European cassette version ===
No.	Title	Writer(s)	Length
1.	"One Night in Heaven"		6:28
2.	"Moving On Up"		5:29
3.	"Excited"		5:04
4.	"Renaissance"		5:20
5.	"Colour My Life (Part One)"	Pickering	5:38
6.	"How Can I Love You More?"		3:20
7.	"Don't Look Any Further"	Golde, Lambert, Hitchings	5:28
8.	"You Just Have to Be There"		5:26
9.	"Little Packet"		5:19
10.	"Love Is in My Soul"		6:15

Note The US vinyl edition contains eight tracks, omitting "Little Packet" & "Love Is in My Soul". In addition to this, "Colour My Life" is placed as track eight.

== Charts ==
=== Weekly charts ===
Chart (1993–1994)	Peak position
Australian Albums (ARIA)	7
Austrian Albums (Ö3 Austria)	23
Dutch Albums (Album Top 100)	67
German Albums (Offizielle Top 100)	18
Hungarian Albums (MAHASZ)	27
New Zealand Albums (RMNZ)	1
Scottish Albums (OCC)	8
Swedish Albums (Sverigetopplistan)	37
Swiss Albums (Schweizer Hitparade)	19
UK Albums (OCC)	2
US Heatseekers Albums (Billboard)	12

=== Year-end charts ===
Chart (1993)	Position
UK Albums (OCC)	14

Chart (1994)	Position
Australian Albums (ARIA)	89
German Albums (Offizielle Top 100)	33
New Zealand Albums (RMNZ)	9

== Certifications ==
Region	Certification	Certified units/sales
Australia (ARIA)	Gold	35,000^{^}
Germany (BVMI)	Gold	250,000^{^}
New Zealand (RMNZ)	Platinum	15,000^{^}
United Kingdom (BPI)	3× Platinum	900,000^{^}
^{^} Shipments figures based on certification alone.
