= The Ultimate Collection =

The Ultimate Collection or Ultimate Collection are names given to a number of compilation music albums:

- The Ultimate Collection (ABC album), 2004
- The Ultimate Collection (Ace of Base album), 2005
- The Ultimate Collection (Oleta Adams album), 2004
- The Ultimate Collection (Aerodrom album), 2008
- The Ultimate Collection (Black Sabbath album), 2016
- The Ultimate Collection (The Brian Setzer Orchestra album), 2004
- The Ultimate Collection (Bryan Ferry and Roxy Music album), 1988
- The Ultimate Collection (Chris de Burgh album), 2000
- The Ultimate Collection (The Carpenters album), 2006
- The Ultimate Collection (1998 Patsy Cline album)
- The Ultimate Collection (2000 Patsy Cline album)
- The Ultimate Collection (Earth, Wind & Fire album), 1999
- The Ultimate Collection (Electric Light Orchestra album), 2001
- The Ultimate Collection (Električni Orgazam album), 2009
- The Ultimate Collection (Emerson, Lake & Palmer album), 2004
- The Ultimate Collection (Evanescence box set), 2017
- The Ultimate Collection (Four Tops album), 1997
- The Ultimate Collection (Garth Brooks album), 2016
- The Ultimate Collection (Renée Geyer album), 2010
- The Ultimate Collection (Gladys Knight and The Pips album), 1997
- The Ultimate Collection (John Lee Hooker album), 1991
- The Ultimate Collection (Whitney Houston album), 2007
- The Ultimate Collection (Katherine Jenkins album), 2009
- The Ultimate Collection (Billy Joel album), 2000
- The Ultimate Collection (Michael Jackson album), 2004
- The Ultimate Collection (Grace Jones album), 2006
- The Ultimate Collection (Jump5 album), 2009
- The Ultimate Collection (B. B. King album), 2005
- The Ultimate Collection (The Kinks album), 2002
- The Ultimate Collection, by Ladysmith Black Mambazo, 2001
- The Ultimate Collection (Madonna), 2000
- The Ultimate Collection (Richard Marx album), 2016
- The Ultimate Collection (Johnny Mathis album), 2011
- The Ultimate Collection by Michael McDonald, 2005
- The Ultimate Collection (The Miracles album), 1998
- The Ultimate Collection (MxPx album), 2008
- The Ultimate Collection (Newsboys album), 2009
- The Ultimate Collection (The O.C. Supertones album), 2008
- The Ultimate Collection (Chihiro Onitsuka album), 2004
- The Ultimate Collection (Osibisa album), 1997
- The Ultimate Collection (Luciano Pavarotti album), 2007
- The Ultimate Collection (Poco album), 1998
- The Ultimate Collection (Rebecca St. James album), 2008
- The Ultimate Collection (Sade album), 2011
- The Ultimate Collection (Santana album), 1997
- The Ultimate Collection (The Seekers album), 2003
- The Ultimate Collection (Paul Simon album), 2015
- The Ultimate Collection (Solution album), 2005
- The Ultimate Collection (Steps album), 2011
- The Ultimate Collection (Barbra Streisand album), 2002
- The Ultimate Collection (2010 Barbra Streisand album)
- The Ultimate Collection (2003 Donna Summer album)
- The Ultimate Collection (2016 Donna Summer album)
- The Ultimate Collection (The Supremes album), 1997
- The Ultimate Collection (The Temptations album), 1997
- The Ultimate Collection (Bonnie Tyler album), 1995
- The Ultimate Collection (Uriah Heep album), 2003
- The Ultimate Collection (Russell Watson album), 2006
- The Ultimate Collection (Barry White album), 2000
- The Ultimate Collection (The Who album), 2002
- "Weird Al" Yankovic: The Ultimate Collection, 1993
- The Ultimate Collection (YU Grupa album), 2009
- The Ultimate Collection (Zabranjeno pušenje album), 2009
- The Ultimate Collection (ZOEgirl album), 2009
- Ultimate Collection (Anastacia album), 2015
- Ultimate Collection (Rick Astley album), 2008
- Ultimate Collection (Buju Banton album), 2001
- Ultimate Collection (Pat Benatar album), 2008
- Ultimate Collection (Black 'n Blue album), 2001
- Ultimate Collection (Joe Cocker album), 2004
- Ultimate Collection (DeBarge album), 1997
- Ultimate Collection (Dennis DeYoung album), 1999
- Ultimate Collection (El DeBarge album), 2003
- Ultimate Collection (Eurythmics album), 2005
- Ultimate Collection (The Fixx album), 1999
- Ultimate Collection (Johnny Gill album), 2002
- Ultimate Collection (Keith Green DVD), 2002
- Ultimate Collection (M People album), 2005
  - Ultimate Collection: The Remixes, 2005
- Ultimate Collection (Aimee Mann album), 2000
- Ultimate Collection (Don Moen album), 2013
- Ultimate Collection (No Angels album), 2003
- Ultimate Collection (Matt Redman album), 2010
- Ultimate Collection (Shanice album), 1999
