= Hot House (band) =

- Origin: England
- Genres: R&B, dance-pop, house, soul
- Years active: 1987–1990
- Label: DeConstruction BMG

Hot House (also billed as "Hot!House") were an English soul music band featuring Heather Small, Martin Colyer and Mark Pringle, who first came to the attention of the British Music Press (Record Mirror etc.) in January 1987. This was when they released the ballad "Don't Come To Stay" on the deConstruction Records label (then named as "De Construction").

The record failed to reach the UK Top 40, peaking at #74 in the UK Singles Chart in February 1987, however the record earned the band acclaim and they recorded tracks for their debut album at Muscle Shoals Sound Studios in Muscle Shoals, Alabama.

In September 1987, the band released "The Way That We Walk". However even with a number of magazine interviews the record failed to reach the UK chart. In fact the band would not enter the chart again until a re-issue of "Don't Come To Stay", re-issued via deConstruction's deal with RCA Records (BMG), eclipsed the original peak by four places in September 1988.

Mark Pringle and Martin Colyer are now directors of Rock's Backpages, an online library of music journalism. Heather Small went on to greater success with M People.

== Discography ==
=== Albums ===
- South (1988)
- Movers and Shakers (1990)

=== Singles ===
- "Don't Come to Stay" (De Construction – CHEZ 1) – January 1987 – UK #74
- "The Way That We Walk" (De Construction – CHEZ 2) – September 1987 UK #78
- "Crazy" (De Construction – PD 42114) – July 1988 UK #99
- "Don't Come to Stay" (reissue) (De Construction – PB 42233) – September 1988 – UK #70
- "Hard As I Try" (De Construction – PB 42657 – March 1989) UK #112
- "Everything You Said" (De Construction – PB 42845 – May 1989) UK #112
- "Losing the Feeling" (De Construction – 1990)
- "Responsible" (De Construction – 1990)
