= Northern Soul (M People album) =

1992 studio album by M People

Studio album by M People
- Released: March 1992
- Recorded: April – August 1991
- Label: Deconstruction
- Producer: M People

M People chronology
Northern Soul (1992)	Elegant Slumming (1993)

2005 re-release cover
- Re-release cover. Note: the 1992 re-release is identical but does not bear the album title on the front cover.

Singles from Northern Soul
- 1. "How Can I Love You More?" Released: 14 October 1991; 2. "Colour My Life" Released: 24 February 1992; 3. "Someday" Released: 6 April 1992; 4. "Excited" Released: 28 September 1992

Professional ratings
Review scores
Source	Rating
AllMusic	3/5 stars
The Encyclopedia of Popular Music	3/5 stars
Melody Maker	(favorable)
NME	(mixed)

Northern Soul is the debut studio album by the British dance band M People. It was first released in March 1992 through Deconstruction Records. It entered the Dance Albums Chart at no. 10 for one week on 4 April 1992. After the release of the single "Excited", a new song not originally included on the album, it was re-released with an updated track listing in late 1992, reaching number 53 on the UK albums chart. Following the success of the band's later albums, Elegant Slumming and Bizarre Fruit, this second version was re-issued in October 1995 and charted at number 26. The album is dedicated to Ritchie Close.

== Track listing ==
All songs written by Mike Pickering and Paul Heard except where noted.

=== Original March 1992 CD version ===
No.	Title	Writer(s)	Length
1.	"Colour My Life"	Pickering	5:34
2.	"How Can I Love You More?"		5:15
3.	"Inner City Cruise"		4:26
4.	"It's Your World"		4:01
5.	"Someday"	Jefferson	5:36
6.	"Sexual Freedom"		5:17
7.	"Kiss It Better"	Pickering, Heard, Rietveld	5:09
8.	"Tumbling Down"		4:39
9.	"Landscape of Love"	Pickering, Heard, Simon	5:44
10.	"Life"		4:53
11.	"Platini"		5:02
12.	"Inner City Dub"		4:29
13.	"Colour My Life" (Original Mix)	Pickering	5:17
14.	"Kiss It Better" (Guitar Mix)	Pickering, Heard, Rietveld	4:48

=== Original March 1992 LP version ===
==== Side one ====
No.	Title	Writer(s)	Length
1.	"Colour My Life"	Pickering	5:34
2.	"How Can I Love You More?"		5:15
3.	"Inner City Cruise"		4:26
4.	"It's Your World"		4:01
5.	"Sexual Freedom"		5:17

==== Side two ====
No.	Title	Writer(s)	Length
6.	"Kiss It Better"	Pickering, Heard, Rietveld	5:09
7.	"Tumbling Down"		4:39
8.	"Landscape of Love"	Pickering, Heard, Simon	5:44
9.	"Life"		4:53
10.	"Someday"	Jefferson	5:36

=== 1992 CD re-release ===
No.	Title	Writer(s)	Length
1.	"Excited" (M People Master Mix)		5:02
2.	"How Can I Love You More?"		5:14
3.	"Colour My Life" (Part One)	Pickering	5:00
4.	"Inner City Cruise"		4:25
5.	"It's Your World"		4:00
6.	"Someday" (Sasha's Full Master)	Jefferson	7:39
7.	"Sexual Freedom"		5:16
8.	"Landscape of Love"	Pickering, Heard, Simon	5:40
9.	"Tumbling Down"		4:38
10.	"Kiss It Better"	Pickering, Heard, Rietveld	5:08
11.	"Man Smart"		5:15
12.	"Colour My Life" (Part Two) (Original Mix)	Pickering	5:02
13.	"Excited" (Judge Jules Remix)		7:24

Note: The track list is absent from the rear of the 1992 re-release cover, only being displayed on the actual disc and liner notes.

=== 1992 LP and Cassette re-release ===
==== Side one ====
No.	Title	Writer(s)	Length
1.	"Excited" (M People Master Mix)		5:02
2.	"How Can I Love You More?"		5:14
3.	"Colour My Life" (Part One)	Pickering	5:00
4.	"Inner City Cruise"		4:25
5.	"It's Your World"		4:00

==== Side two ====
No.	Title	Writer(s)	Length
6.	"Someday" (Sasha's Full Master)	Jefferson	7:39
7.	"Sexual Freedom"		5:16
8.	"Landscape of Love"	Pickering, Heard, Simon	5:40
9.	"Tumbling Down"		4:38
10.	"Kiss It Better"	Pickering, Heard, Rietveld	5:08

=== 2005 re-release (remastered) ===
No.	Title	Writer(s)	Length
1.	"Excited" (M People Master Mix)		5:04
2.	"Colour My Life"	Pickering	5:38
3.	"How Can I Love You More?"		5:16
4.	"Inner City Cruise"		4:28
5.	"It's Your World"		4:03
6.	"Sexual Freedom"		5:18
7.	"Kiss It Better"	Pickering, Heard, Rietveld	5:11
8.	"Tumbling Down"		4:41
9.	"Landscape of Love"	Pickering, Heard, Simon	5:42
10.	"Life"		4:53
11.	"Someday"	Jefferson	5:36
12.	"Excited" (Judge Jules Remix)		7:24
13.	"Man Smart"		5:17
14.	"Platini"		5:01
15.	"How Can I Love You More?" (Sasha's Master Edit)		3:20
