= Excited (M People song) =

1992 single by M People

Single by M People

from the album Northern Soul
- Released: 28 September 1992
- Genre: House; Philly soul
- Length: 3:46
- Label: RCA; Deconstruction
- Songwriters: Mike Pickering; Paul Heard
- Producer: M People

M People singles chronology
"Someday" (1992)	"Excited" (1992)	"How Can I Love You More (Mixes)" (1993)

Music video
- "Excited" on YouTube

Alternative cover
- US 12-inch cover of "Excited"

"Excited" is a song by the British band M People, released in September 1992 by RCA and Deconstruction Records as the fourth and final single from their first album, Northern Soul (1992), though it only appeared on the re-release. The song was written by band members Mike Pickering and Paul Heard, and peaked at number 29 on the UK Singles Chart and number four on the Music Week Dance Singles chart. Two different music videos were produced for the single release.

== Background ==
After three Top 40 hits, where each single had charted lower than the one before, M People went back into the studio to record some new tracks for a 1992 re-release of their first album. Two tracks, "Excited" and "Man Smart", were chosen to replace the outgoing "Life" and "Platini". The band planned to release a revised track listing as well, and the track "Excited" was to be the opener, with its fresher, more fun sound. They were looking for a song that would take them from the underground to a more widespread and populist audience as the 1991 version of the album had only reached the lower levels of the chart.

== Chart performance ==
When the single was released, it sold in excess of 27,000 copies in its first week to enter the chart at 30. After their second Top of the Pops appearance the single sold slightly more (29,000 copies) to climb one place to its peak position of 29, equalling the peak position of the parent album's first single, "How Can I Love You More?", and became their fourth consecutive Top 40 hit and second top thirty hit.

The song stayed in the Top 40 for three weeks, climbing from its entry position of 30 up to 29 and back down to 35 in its third week. For the final two weeks the single slid down to 53 and then, finally, to 74.

== Critical reception ==
Upon the 1994-release, Larry Flick from Billboard magazine wrote, "Few dance/pop albums are as consistently potent as this band's US debut, Elegant Slumming. On its third, top 40 offering, singer Heather Small bounces over a lively, Philly soul-influenced groove with a performance that is, by turns, giddy and hearty. Programmers with a savvy musical ear will feast on the cut's brassy horn flourishes and rollicking piano lines. Meanwhile, dancefloor enthusiasts will subscribe to the bass intensity and percolating breaks." In 1992, a reviewer from Lennox Herald described "Excited" as a "very open and spacious dance track with classy vocal". Ian Gittins from Melody Maker thought that the band was let down "by seriously lame'n'lazy lyrics". Alan Jones from Music Week felt M People were "operating at the more sophisticated end of the dance music spectrum". John Kilgo from The Network Forty named the song "an uptempo jammer".

== Music video ==
There are two music videos for the single, one for the UK and one for the US.

The UK video was filmed in summer 1992, once the band had been in the studio to record "Man Smart" and "Excited". It shows Small with her hair tied up, for the first time in two different poses. She mostly wears a grey trouser suit over a black vest and, in other scenes, she sings from a red chaise longue, wearing a purple suede figure-hugging gown, surrounded by flowers, and her face is decorated with small white beads around the eyes. Throughout the video, there are shots and silhouettes of Pickering and Paul Heard being photographed together. Small is seen performing separately.

The US video, filmed in summer 1994 between the second and third albums (Elegant Slumming and Bizarre Fruit), shows all members of the band, including the Bizarre Fruit musicians: Andy Gangadeen on drums, backing vocalists Paul Johnson and Lynieve Austin and percussionist Shovel, who at this point had become full member. Heard plays keyboards and Pickering saxophone.

The band members are seen performing at an indoor Los Angeles pool party from the side of the pool, while party revellers are dancing round the pool's edge. Halfway through the song and leading towards the middle eight of “You and me, so excited”, the revellers one-by-one start to jump into the pool and continue to have fun. The band plays on, being splashed by water but continue playing happily. There is a gold hue throughout the pool-side video.

== Artwork ==
The artwork for the CD single is simply 16 differently shaded red rectangles laid out in a 4 x 4 pattern with two of the boxes coloured a starkly bright yellow. The name of the single is in white lettering on a black banner with a smaller signature red rose (seen on previous single "Someday") to the top centre left.

The UK album artwork is slightly different with the same 16 differently shaded red rectangles laid out in a 4 x 4 pattern but two of the yellow boxes are in a different arrangement and the black title banner is across the top.

The US artwork also has the same 16 differently shaded red rectangles laid out in a 4 x 4 pattern but two of the yellow boxes are in a different arrangement; one is in the bottom right corner on the 12-inch (bottom centre right on the CD single) and the other is mid-centre directly above the centre banner and contains an image of the Elegant Slumming album cover sofa portrait of Pickering, Johnson and Shovel because the single was on the US version of that album.

== Track listings ==
=== UK release ===
- 7–inch single – 74321 11633 7
1. "Excited" (Radio Edit) – 3:46
2. "Excited" (M People Dub) – 5:03
- 12–inch single – 74321 11633 1
1. "Excited" (M People Master Mix) – 5:00
2. "Excited" (M People Dub) – 5:03
3. "Excited" (Judge Jules Remix) – 7:25
4. "Excited" (M People Remix) – 5:35
- CD single – 74321 11633 2
1. "Excited" (Radio Edit) – 3:46
2. "Excited" (Judge Jules Remix) – 7:25
3. "Excited" (M People Master Mix) – 5:06
4. "Excited" (M People Remix) – 5:35
5. "Excited" (M People Dub) – 5:03
6. "Excited" (Judge Jules Dub) – 5:35

=== US release ===
- Cassette single – 34T 77731
1. "Excited" (Radio Edit) – 3:46
2. "Excited" (MK 7" Edit) – 3:51
- 12-inch single – 49 77731
1. "Excited" (MK Mix) – 8:32
2. "Excited" (MK T Mix) – 8:10
3. "Excited" (M People Master Mix) – 5:00
4. "Excited" (MK Snow-Call Dub) – 7:33
5. "Excited" (M People Dub) – 5:00
- CD single – 49K 77720
1. "Excited" (Radio Edit) – 3:46
2. "Excited" (MK 7-inch Edit) – 3:51
3. "Excited" (M People Master Mix) – 5:00
4. "Excited" (Judge Jules Remix) – 7:21
5. "Excited" (MK Mix) – 8:32

== Charts ==
Chart (1992)	Peak Position
Europe (Eurochart Hot 100)	95
Europe (European Dance Radio)	19
UK Singles (OCC)	29
UK Airplay (Music Week)	42
UK Dance (Music Week)	4
UK Club Chart (Music Week)	14

Chart (1994–95)	Peak Position
Quebec (ADISQ)	24
US Dance Club Songs (Billboard)	1
US Maxi-Singles Sales (Billboard)	13
