= Colour My Life =

Single by M People

from the album Northern Soul
- B-side: "Sexual Freedom"; "Landscape of Love"
- Released: 24 February 1992
- Genre: House; disco; funk; Philly soul
- Length: 5:35
- Label: RCA; Deconstruction
- Songwriters: Mike Pickering; Paul Heard
- Producers: M People; Paul Oakenfold; Steve Osborne

M People singles chronology
| "How Can I Love You More?" (1991) | "Colour My Life" (1992) | "Someday" (1992) |

Music video
- "Colour My Life" on YouTube

1991 release
- Cover of the 12" Single release, the 7" Single and CD Single releases featured slightly different artwork.

"Colour My Life" is a song by British band M People, released as the second single from their first album, Northern Soul (1992). It was written by band members Mike Pickering and Paul Heard. The single was originally released in May 1991 and was given a full release on 24 February 1992 by RCA and Deconstruction Records. It peaked at number thirty five on the UK Singles Chart, number 13 on the Music Week Dance Singles chart and number six on the UK Club Chart.

== Background ==
As one of the album's premiere cuts, "Colour My Life" had already had built up a quite a following and gained critical praise in clubs as a much-played dance song when previewed as a White Label the year previously and most dance floors had picked up and rotated this version throughout 1991 providing great exposure. The first single that M People's Mike Pickering wrote for specifically for lead vocalist, 25-year-old Heather Small and the first M People track she ever recorded.

== Chart performance ==
The single became their second moderate chart hit, but did not fare as well as predecessor "How Can I Love You More?" which scraped into the Top 30 at 29. In the week of release the single sold 7,400 copies to land at number 37, but club support saw the single maintain sales and climb in its second week to peak at number 35 selling a further 8,000 copies.

== Critical reception ==
Jose F. Promis from AllMusic described the song as "funky". Larry Flick from Billboard magazine wrote, "London club DJ Mike Pickering crafts a delicious blend of raw funk and silky disco. Floating piano lines and an unidentified muselike female vocal add an ethereal vibe." Irish Evening Herald noted the "woozy refrain" of the song. Fred Shuster from Los Angeles Daily News named "Colour My Life" the "highlight" of the album, and "an update of the Chic disco formula of male-female vocals, piano, bubbling bass and strings." Paul Mathur from Melody Maker viewed it as the weakest track of the album, "swishing aimlessly". Pan-European magazine Music & Media commented, "Although from Manchester, this is a long way from the "madchester" beat. This quartet, featuring Hot House lead vocalist Heather Small, mixes '70s "northern soul" with a mellow house style. Hypnotizing, but still melodic."

On the album review, Music & Media named the song "the best Philly soul pastiche in ages." Andy Beevers from Music Week complimented it as a "classy soul song". Simon Dudfield from NME wrote, "Welcome return by Hacienda DJ Mike Pickering. Soulful strings and a deep, warm, swinging feel underpinned by some piano and funky, choppy guitars. Heather Small (ex-Hot House) supplies the groovacious vocals. Laidback and unflustered, a record perfectly in harmony with itself." James Hamilton from Record Mirror said, "This Mike Pickering created wah wah wukka-wukked, piano plonked and synthetic strings stabbed, sinous husky Cleo Laine-ish girl moaned 109.2bpm slinky jiggler sounds quite classy, although it's more a repetitive groove than an actual song". Adam Higginbotham from Select also named "Colour My Life" the best track on the Northern Soul album.

== Remixes ==
There are several different mixes of the single, but the main version is simply known as "Colour My Life". Other versions are remixes of the single produced by M People, these being "Colour My Life (Part One)", "Colour My Life (Part Two)" and "Colour My Life (Original Mix)". The "Original Mix" appears in an edited format on the 1991 CD release as the "M People Edit" and in full on the 1992 album Northern Soul, but not on this single.

== Music video ==
The studio-set music video for the song features Heather Small singing and dancing in a striking lime green jacket centre stage with the band playing along in the background. Paul Heard is playing bass guitar and Mike Pickering on the keyboards, not their normal instruments to play and also a drummer percussionist and two lively backing singers co-ordinating dance moves with their arms.

== Artwork ==
The artwork of the single combines the lines used in the limited release to become four colourful "flowers" that consist of differently coloured red, blue, green and purple circles which is very much in-keeping with the big red flower illustration that is on the parent's album's artwork.

== Track listings & formats ==
=== Original 1991 release ===
- 7" single – PB 44439
1. "Colour My Life" (Short Oakenfold/Osborne Mix) – 3:33
2. "Colour My Life" (M People Edit) – 3:47
- CD single – PD 44440
1. "Colour My Life" (Short Oakenfold/Osborne Mix) – 3:33
2. "Colour My Life" (M People Edit) – 3:47
3. "Colour My Life" (Oakenfold/Osborne Mix) – 5:35
4. "Colour My Life" (Cuba Mix) – 5:32
- 12" single – PT 44440
1. "Colour My Life" (Album version) – 5:34
2. "Colour My Life" (Cuba Mix) – 5:32
3. "Colour My Life" (Short Oakenfold/Osborne Mix) – 3:33

=== 1992 re-release ===
- 7" single – PB 45241
- Cassette single – PK 45242
1. "Colour My Life" (Radio Edit) – 3:27
2. "Sexual Freedom" (Album version) – 5:40
- CD single (Extended Play) – PD 45242
- 12" single (Extended Play) – PT 45242
1. "Colour My Life" (Part One) – 5:03
2. "Colour My Life" (Part Two) – 5:05
3. "Sexual Freedom" (Album version) – 4:17
4. "Landscape of Love" (Album version) – 5:40

== Charts ==
=== Weekly charts ===
| Chart (1991–1992) | Peak position |
|---|---|
| Australia (ARIA) | 205 |
| UK Singles (OCC) | 35 |
| UK Airplay (Music Week) | 29 |
| UK Dance (Music Week) | 13 |
| UK Club Chart (Record Mirror) | 6 |

=== Year-end charts ===
| Chart (1991) | Position |
|---|---|
| UK Club Chart (Record Mirror) | 80 |
