= Don't Look Any Further (album) =

Studio album by Dennis Edwards
- Released: 1984
- Studios: Soundcastle Studios (Silver Lake, California); Music Grinder Studios (Hollywood, Los Angeles, California)
- Genres: R&B, soul, funk
- Length: 38:01
- Language: English
- Labels: Gordy Records, RCA Records
- Producer: Dennis Lambert

Dennis Edwards chronology
Don't Look Any Further (1984)	Coolin' Out (1985)

Singles from Don't Look Any Further
- 1. "Don't Look Any Further" Released: April 3, 1984; 2. "(You're My) Aphrodisiac" Released: 1984; 3. "Just Like You" Released: 1984

Professional ratings
Review scores
Source	Rating
AllMusic	link

Don't Look Any Further is the debut solo album by American R&B singer Dennis Edwards, former lead singer of the Temptations. The album was released in 1984 through Gordy Records.

== Background ==
Edwards first made a solo recording in 1977, but had nothing to show for it but an unreleased album. He returned for the sessions of The Temptations' album Back to Basics, but then again left in the middle of the sessions.

== Commercial performance ==
The album reached No. 2 on the R&B charts. The album was launched with the hit single "Don't Look Any Further", a duet with Siedah Garrett. Though Edwards never had another big solo hit, "Don’t Look Any Further" created its own legacy, partly due to Edwards’ and Garrett's performances, and partly due to its iconic bassline. The bassline served as the bedrock for dozens of hip-hop, R&B, and pop tracks in the decades to follow.

It also included the radio singles "(You're My) Aphrodisiac" and "Just Like You".

== Track listing ==
No.	Title	Writer(s)	Length
1.	"I'm Up for You"	Peter Beckett, Paul Jackson, Jr.	4:20
2.	"Don't Look Any Further" (duet with Siedah Garrett)	Dennis Lambert, Duane Hitchings, Franne Golde	4:02
3.	"(You're My) Aphrodisiac"	Dennis Lambert, John Charles Crowley	4:30
4.	"Can't Fight It"	John Pati	4:41
5.	"Another Place in Time"	Sam Kunin, Gloria Skerlov	4:12
6.	"Shake Hands (Come Out Dancin')"	Dennis Lambert, Peter Beckett	4:23
7.	"I Thought I Could Handle It"	Dennis Lambert, Franne Golde, Robert Preston	3:59
8.	"Just Like You"	Jeff Pescetto	4:00
9.	"Let's Go Up"	Franne Golde, Peter Ivers	3:57

== Charts ==
Chart (1984)	Peak position
US R&B Albums	2
