= One Night in Heaven =

1993 single by M People

Single by M People

from the album Elegant Slumming
- Released: 14 June 1993
- Genre: Dance-pop; British house
- Length: 3:39
- Label: Deconstruction
- Songwriters: Mike Pickering; Paul Heard
- Producer: M People

M People singles chronology
"How Can I Love You More (Mixes)" (1993)	"One Night in Heaven" (1993)	"Moving On Up" (1993)

Music video
- "One Night in Heaven" on YouTube

Alternative cover
- US cover of "One Night in Heaven".

"One Night in Heaven" is a song by British band M People, released as their sixth overall single and the first single from their second album, Elegant Slumming (1993). Written by band members Mike Pickering and Paul Heard, and produced by the band, the song was released on 14 June 1993 by Deconstruction Records. It was successful in Europe, peaking at number six on the UK Singles Chart. In Iceland, it reached number five, while peaking at number 26 on the Eurochart Hot 100. Its accompanying music video was filmed in Barcelona, Sitges and Montserrat in Spain.

== Composition ==
The song was recorded at the Roundhouse in Chalk Farm, London. The key refrain "One Night in Heaven, One Night in Heaven" is sung by British vocalist Juliet Roberts who sings backing vocals throughout. The song is made up of a variety of key elements, most notably, the sequenced "brass bottle" synths at the intro and in the break. The melody line is guided by the moog bassline, programmed drumming and layered with high hat synths and a continuous beat. This is embodied by the progressive chords and additional chords during the choruses. In the chorus the song bears a startling resemblance to a Top 20 1975 hit song called "Highwire" by Linda Carr and The Love Squad.

== Chart performance ==
Like the previous single, "One Night in Heaven" became the second consecutive single to enter the top 10 and climb higher. It is the only M People single to climb not once, but twice. It spent the first three weeks climbing from its introductory chart position of number nine to seven to then peak in its third week at number six. The single sold 190,000 copies and spent a total of 11 weeks on the chart.

"One in Night in Heaven" became a massive success Europe-wide, scoring a top-10 hit also in Iceland (5), and a top-20 hit in Belgium (19), Germany (15), Ireland (12), and Sweden (12). On the dance chart, M People were held off the top spot by Haddaway's "What Is Love". The song also reached No. 1 on the Billboard Hot Dance Club Play chart in the US in 1994, number three on the Canadian RPM Dance chart and number eight in Israel.

== Critical reception ==
Keith Farley from AllMusic described the song as "driving British house". Another AllMusic editor, Jon O'Brien, felt it is "still as joyously infectious as ever". Larry Flick from Billboard magazine wrote that Heather Small "continues to shine as a unique and compelling frontwoman, while tunesmiths/musicians Mike Pickering and Paul Heard provide a track that combines disco, house, and Philly soul flavors." He added, "A club smash that is ripe for radio picking. Don't be left out." Ben Thompson from The Independent viewed it as "vibrant", adding that "contemporary pop-soul" does not get much better than this. In his weekly UK chart commentary, James Masterton noted that "this totally new track is if anything even more commercial [than 'How Can I Love You More?']?". Pan-European magazine Music & Media stated that "the dance avant gardists have become more poppy than ever. With this heavily sequenced song on an "old fashioned" disco beat, these people are again probably light years ahead of their time." Alan Jones from Music Week praised it as a "pop/dance gem from Manchester's finest, with some particularly attractive wailing from Heather Small. It's immediate and highly commercial."

Another editor of Music Week, Andy Beevers, named it Pick of the Week in the category of Dance, describing it as "upbeat soul, driven by an inventive house mix", that "should make the mainstream charts". A reviewer from The Network Forty stated that it "picks up right where their first smash, 'Moving On Up', left off. Huge in the UK, M People are beginning to spread their magic to the colonies." Iestyn George from NME said that "One Night in Heaven" is "encapsulating euphoria within a three minute pop song". Sam Taylor from The Observer called the song "joyous". James Hamilton from the Record Mirror Dance Update complimented it as "gloriously catchy cantering" with a "Sixties soul chorus" in his weekly dance column. Tom Doyle from Smash Hits felt it "proved M People are the finest exponents of the party garage sound." Jonathan Bernstein from Spin complimented Small's "smoky alto" and an "all-time great one-two sucker punch" of the "aptly titled" "One Night in Heaven".

== Airplay ==
"One Night in Heaven" was serviced to radio four weeks before physical release on 19 May as the follow-up to previous airplay top 10 smash "How Can I Love You More (Mixes)". By the end of week one on airplay, the single had become the highest new entry being played 315 times on UK Radio placing it straight in at Number 58. All UK Independent Local Radio stations, BBC Radio 2 and even Radio 1 had added the song to their A-Lists. It became M People's first Airplay Chart number one in the UK where it remained for two weeks. It then took another eleven weeks to leave the Airplay Top 75 which meant it was still being heavily played when its successor "Moving on Up" was released to radio.

== Music video ==
The accompanying music video for "One Night in Heaven" was filmed in Barcelona, Sitges and Montserrat at the end of April 1993 and filmed over two days. It was the first M People music video to be filmed abroad with a relatively larger budget. The premise was to introduce the band and show them singing along to the song and having fun. The band's three members Heather Small, Mike Pickering and Paul Heard and the band's percussionist Shovell (for the first time, who would later become full-time member) are all featured in various scenes within popular tourist spots including Park Güell and the Sagrada Família both designed by Antoni Gaudí.

== Live performances ==
In its original live incarnation, "One Night in Heaven" gets arguably one of the largest rapturous audience response, than any other single. During the Elegant Slumming, Bizarre Fruit, Bizarre Fruit II tours as well as T in the Park and Glastonbury in 1994, it has been performed as the full-length album version towards the end of the second half their shows (pre-encore). From 1996 onwards they have performed the song with the David Morales Classic Mix intro found on Elegantly American. Snake Davis also no longer plays flute during the choruses.

== Track listings ==
In the UK, the CD single does not contain the radio edit. At the time the radio edit was only made available on the 7-inch version of the single, whilst compilations featured a shorter 3.25 edit. The US release of the single includes remixes by David Morales, which were later released in the UK on the EP Elegantly American in 1994.

=== UK release ===
- Cassette single – 74321 15185 4
- 7" single – 74321 15185 7
1. "One Night in Heaven" (Master Edit) – 3:39
2. "One Night in Heaven" (Hi Gloss Dub) (Edit) – 3:11
- 12" single – 74321 15185 1
1. "One Night in Heaven" (Master Mix) – 6:32
2. "One Night in Heaven" (Harri's Dub) – 7:54
3. "One Night in Heaven" (Hi Gloss Mix) – 6:22
4. "One Night in Heaven" (Hi Gloss Dub) – 5:56
- CD single – 74321 15185 2
1. "One Night in Heaven" (Master Mix) – 6:32
2. "One Night in Heaven" (Harri's Dub) – 7:54
3. "One Night in Heaven" (Hi Gloss Mix) – 6:22
4. "One Night in Heaven" (Hi Gloss Dub) – 5:56
5. "One Night in Heaven" (Harri's Vocal) – 7:07

=== US release ===
- Cassette single – 34T 77616
1. "One Night in Heaven" (7" Mix) – 3:39
2. "One Night in Heaven" (Thee Def Radio Mix) – 3:54
- 12" single – 49 77613
1. "One Night in Heaven" (Thee Def Club Mix) – 7:19
2. "One Night in Heaven" (M People Master Mix) – 6:32
3. "One Night in Heaven" (The Tunnel Mix) – 5:03
4. "One Night in Heaven" (Classic Mix) – 6:35
5. "One Night in Heaven" (Tragedy Dub) – 6:40
- CD single – 49K 77613
1. "One Night in Heaven" (7" Mix) – 3:39
2. "One Night in Heaven" (Thee Def Radio Mix) – 3:54
3. "One Night in Heaven" (Classic Radio Mix) – 3:53
4. "One Night in Heaven" (M People Master Mix) – 6:32
5. "One Night in Heaven" (Thee Def Club Mix) – 7:19
6. "Man Smart" – 5:15

== Charts ==
=== Weekly charts ===
Weekly chart performance for "One Night in Heaven"
Chart (1993–1994)	Peak position
Australia (ARIA)	23
Belgium (Ultratop 50 Flanders)	22
Belgium (VRT Top 30 Flanders)	19
Canada Top Singles (RPM)	67
Canada Dance/Urban (RPM)	3
Europe (Eurochart Hot 100)	26
Europe (European Dance Radio)	1
Europe (European Hit Radio)	18
Germany (Media Control Charts)	15
Iceland (Íslenski Listinn Topp 40)	5
Ireland (IRMA)	12
Israel (Israeli Singles Chart)	8
Netherlands (Dutch Top 40 Tipparade)	2
Netherlands (Single Top 100)	26
New Zealand (Recorded Music NZ)	26
Quebec (ADISQ)	21
Sweden (Sverigetopplistan)	12
UK Singles (OCC)	6
UK Dance (OCC)	40
UK Airplay (Music Week)	3
UK Dance (Music Week)	2
UK Club Chart (Music Week)	3
US Dance Club Play (Billboard)	1
US Maxi-Singles Sales (Billboard)	9

=== Year-end charts ===
1993 year-end chart performance for "One Night in Heaven"
Chart (1993)	Position
Germany (Media Control)	76
Iceland (Íslenski Listinn Topp 40)	69
Sweden (Topplistan)	97
UK Singles (OCC)	42
UK Airplay (Music Week)	20

1994 year-end chart performance for "One Night in Heaven"
Chart (1994)	Position
Canada Dance/Urban (RPM)	33
US Dance Club Play (Billboard)	3

== See also ==
- List of number-one dance hits (United States)
