= Someday (CeCe Rogers song) =

1987 single by CeCe Rogers

Single by CeCe Rogers
- Released: 1987
- Genre: Dance; deep house
- Length: 7:17 (club mix)
- Label: Atlantic
- Songwriter: Marshall Jefferson
- Producer: Marshall Jefferson

CeCe Rogers singles chronology
"Someday" (1987)	"Forever" (1989)

Music video
- "Someday" on YouTube

"Someday" is a song by American singer-songwriter CeCe Rogers. It is well-known for its recognisable piano riff and widely acclaimed for its influence on electronic music culture. Marshall Jefferson wrote the lyrics to "Someday" and recruited Rogers to sing the vocals after seeing him in a show with 'Ce Ce & Company'. Jefferson recorded Rogers' warm up vocal. When Rogers said he was ready to start recording the first take, Jefferson told him they had already finished. It was the greatest vocal performance Jefferson had heard on a dance record, but Rogers wanted to re-record it and he did it. Rogers was signed to Atlantic Records, making "Someday" the first house-music song released by a major label. The track went on to sell millions, a landmark release for house music. British band M People released a cover of the song in 1992.

== Critical reception ==
In 1994, Andrew Harrison from Select wrote, "Those who whinge that house lacks emotional depth will choke when they hear its gospel tradition laid bear [sic] in CeCe Rogers' 'Someday', a beautiful, sad, soaring, dignified hymn to hopes for human brotherhood."

== Impact and legacy ==
In 1992, "Someday" was heavily sampled by British dance act Liquid for their hit "Sweet Harmony", which reached #15 on the UK Singles Chart and then peaked at #14 when remixed and released in 1995.

In 1996, clubbing and electronic dance music magazine Mixmag ranked the song number three in its "100 Greatest Dance Singles Of All Time" list, writing, "No single record distils the collectivist, loving spirit of house music like 'Someday'. The conscious lyrics, beautiful singing and Marshall Jefferson's live-sounding production may sound dated, but that adds to its classic status. No surprise that the simple, but potent downward moving chord sequence was used later on every bloody record ever, including 'Sweet Harmony' by Liquid and ripped off on the Farley and Heller version of 'There But for the Grace of God', while the vocal line was nicked for 'Some Justice' by Urban Shakedown. A true classic record." British DJ Tony Walker named it one of his favourites in same year, saying, "An all-time classic from an artist who exudes talent. A song with a message as well as a groove. Sheer class."

In 1998, DJ Magazine ranked "Someday" number six in their list of "Top 100 Club Tunes". In 2015, The Daily Telegraph ranked it number 36 in their "Top 50 Dance Songs" list. In 2020, NME ranked it among "The 20 Best House Music Songs... Ever!".

The song was featured on the fictional SF-UR radio station in the 2004 video game Grand Theft Auto: San Andreas.

== Track listings ==
- 12-inch single, US (1987)
1. "Someday" (club mix) – 7:17
2. "Someday" (radio mix) – 3:49
- 12-inch single, US (1987)
1. "Someday" (club mix) – 7:17
2. "Someday" (Some Dub) – 8:43
3. "Someday" (Accainstrumental) – 6:19

== M People version ==
"Someday"

Single by M People

from the album Northern Soul
- B-side: "Platini"
- Released: April 6, 1992
- Genre: House
- Length: 3:30
- Label: RCA; Deconstruction
- Songwriter: Marshall Jefferson
- Producer: M People

M People singles chronology
"Colour My Life" (1992)	"Someday" (1992)	"Excited" (1992)

Music video
- "Someday" on YouTube

British band M People released a cover of "Someday" in April 1992 by RCA and Deconstruction Records as the third single from their first album, Northern Soul (1992). The song, produced by the band, peaked at number thirty eight on the UK Singles Chart and number ten on the UK Dance Singles Chart.

=== Background ===
"Someday" was the only cover version to appear on the Northern Soul album and the original version was released in 1987 by CeCe Rogers. "Someday" was the first house song to be signed by a major label and it sold millions worldwide in the late eighties. As a DJ, M People's Mike Pickering had always played the track as part of his set as it was a perennial club classic and 5 years after its original release, Mike decided to give the song a Northern nineties soul groove.

=== Chart performance ===
The single became their third consecutive Top-40 hit, but is also their lowest ranking chart single of all the M People releases, not performing as well as predecessors "How Can I Love You More?" and "Colour My Life" entering the chart at number 39 and climbing up one place to 38 in its second week selling around 6,300 copies in its first two weeks to land at number 39 and 38 in its respective weeks. A considerable sales decline in its third and final week the single charted at 62 selling 7,500 copies.

=== Critical reception ===
Alan Jones from Music Week wrote, "M-People, whose decision to rescue the track from comparative obscurity is justified by their peppy performance, which centres around a distinctive (but not too diva-like) lead vocal courtesy of Heather Small and a basslinc that is a closely related mutation of the one that has carried the other Ce Ce — Ms. Peniston — to success with 'Finally'. Excellent crossover possibilities." A reviewer from NME said, "Time for another religious dancefloor experience. A superb cover of the Marshall Jefferson-penned classic that will go down a storm in club country. Smooth vocals from Heather Small drift through the track in a brand new way, yet retain the deep emotion of the song."

=== Remixes ===
There are only a few mixes of the single, with instrumental album track "Platini" being the B-side. On the CD the remixes are from M People themselves who issued two other versions of the single alongside the radio edit from the original March 1992 Northern Soul album. "Someday (Part one)" appeared on the original Northern Soul and "Someday (Part 2)" was a completely revised funked up version. On the re-issued Northern Soul released in late 1992, Sasha had remixed the single and this replaced the original version.

=== Music video ===
The studio-set music video for "Someday" features Heather Small singing and dancing alone surrounded by darkness and later, with a strobe lighting effect in the background. She wears a yellow jacket on a black polo neck with enormous earrings. This is intercut with footage of the band performing the song live from their 1992 Northern Soul Tour featuring the rest of the band, Mike Pickering, Paul Heard and the live session musicians.

=== Artwork ===
The artwork of the single incorporates the House of Lancashire Red Rose, hailing both the Northern origins of the music but also reflecting Mike Pickering's Lancashire roots. The Red Rose itself has been symbolic for various countries around the world but in Northern England the imagery is steeped in history with a series of civil wars called Wars of the Roses dealing with two branches of noble power who wanted the English throne for themselves, the house of Lancashire represented by the red rose and the house of York represented by the white rose. These wars were fought off and on throughout the years of 1455 and 1485, with the final "battle" being won by Henry Tudor, Earl of Richmond and the house of Lancashire. Henry Tudor VII married Elizabeth of York uniting the two families as one. So really all the fighting was for nothing since in the end they all came together in a "Happily Ever After" sort of way, fitting the sentiments to the lyrics of the song. For the first and only time, the sleeve states, 'M People with Heather Small'.

=== Track listings ===
- 7" single – PB 45369
- Cassette single – PK 45369
1. "Someday" (Edit) – 3:33
2. "Platini" (Album version) – 5:02
- CD single – PD 45369
1. "Someday" (Edit) – 3:33
2. "Someday" (Part 1) – 6:00
3. "Someday" (Part 2) – 6:41
4. "Platini" (Album version) – 5:02
- 12" single – PT 45369
1. "Someday" (Part 1) – 6:00
2. "Someday" (Edit) – 3:33
3. "Someday" (Part 2) – 6:41
4. "Platini" (Album version) – 5:02

=== Charts ===
==== Weekly charts ====
Chart (1992)	Peak position
UK Singles (OCC)	38
UK Airplay (Music Week)	41
UK Dance (Music Week)	10
UK Club Chart (Music Week)	11

==== Year-end charts ====
Chart (1992)	Position
UK Club Chart (Music Week)	70
