= Moving On Up (M People song) =

1993 single by M People

Single by M People

from the album Elegant Slumming
- Released: 13 September 1993
- Genre: Dance-pop; nu-disco
- Length: 5:29 (album version); 3:34 (single edit)
- Label: Deconstruction
- Songwriters: Mike Pickering; Paul Heard
- Producer: M People

M People singles chronology
"One Night in Heaven" (1993)	"Moving On Up" (1993)	"Don't Look Any Further" (1993)

Music video
- "Moving On Up" on YouTube

"Moving On Up" is the seventh overall single from British band M People, and the second single from their second album, Elegant Slumming (1993). Written by band members Mike Pickering and Paul Heard, and produced by M People, it was released on 13 September 1993 by Deconstruction Records. The song peaked at number two on the UK Singles Chart and number one on the Music Week Dance Singles chart and was the biggest selling M People single. It also became a top-40 hit on the US Billboard Hot 100 and peaked at number one on the Billboard Dance Club Play chart. The accompanying music video for the song, directed by John Clayton, featured the band performing in a club and received two nominations at the 1994 Billboard Music Video Awards.

== Artwork ==
On United Kingdom and European versions of the single, the cover appeared with two thirds of the cover featuring a side profile of lead singer Heather Small, looking serious to hint that she's moving away. The bottom third of the CD single has a purple banner all the way across with the title written on it. On other versions of the single, the colour of this banner was red (7 inch), yellow (cassette) or blue (12 inch).

== Chart performance ==
"Moving On Up" proved to be M People's biggest hit worldwide. In North America, it peaked at number one on both the RPM Dance chart in Canada and the US Billboard Dance Club Play chart, as well as number 23 on the Canadian RPM 100 Hit Tracks chart, number 34 on the Billboard Hot 100 and number 16 on the US Cash Box Top 100. In Europe, the single entered the top 10 in Finland (6), France (3), Greece (4), Ireland (4), and the United Kingdom. In the latter, it peaked at number two in its second week at the UK Singles Chart, on 26 September 1993. It was held off reaching the top spot by DJ Jazzy Jeff & the Fresh Prince's "Boom! Shake the Room" and spent eleven weeks within the UK Top 100. But on the Music Week Airplay and Dance Singles charts and the Record Mirror Club Chart, it soared to the number one position. Additionally, "Moving On Up" was a top-20 hit in Austria (17), Belgium (17), Denmark (18), the Netherlands (11), Sweden (20) and Switzerland (19). On the Eurochart Hot 100, it peaked at number 12 on 16 October, after having debuted at number 16 two weeks before, when the song charted in the UK. Elsewhere, "Moving On Up" peaked at number five in Israel, and number four in both Australia and New Zealand.

The single earned a gold record in New Zealand (5,000) and in the UK (400,000), and a platinum record in Australia (70,000).

== Critical reception ==
Keith Farley from AllMusic described the song as a "nu-disco slant". Another AllMusic editor, Jose F. Promis, declared it as "electrifying". Larry Flick from Billboard magazine wrote that here, frontwoman Heather Small and the band "deftly blends state-of-the-charts club trends with a reverence for classic Motown and R&B sounds. After one spin, you'll be humming the chorus for a week, which is the mark of a true smash." Kendall Morgan from Dallas Morning News complimented it as "ear candy". Anderson Jones from Entertainment Weekly viewed it as a number "that has set disco balls spinning across Europe". Dave Sholin from the Gavin Report said that excitement about "this uptempo winner" is spreading fast and "one listen should explain why." Ben Thompson from The Independent called it "exceptionally feisty", adding that contemporary pop-soul does not get much better than this. Robert Hilburn from Los Angeles Times named it a "glorious dancefloor record – as spirited a declaration of independence (from a bad relationship) as Gloria Gaynor's 'I Will Survive'." In his weekly UK chart commentary, James Masterton viewed it as "another piece of classic dance pop". Howard Cohen for the Miami Herald wrote, "The song's got a sassy hook, paired with a glossy fat beat and infectious melody. The song – an 'I Will Survive' for the '90s – is the highlight of M People's Elegant Slumming". Pan-European magazine Music & Media concluded that "the '90s will be type-cast as the age of retro, both in rock and in dance. These people restore Funky Town as the capital of good old disco. A floor filler annex airplay hit is born!"

Andy Beevers from Music Week gave the song a full score of five out of five and named it Pick of the Week in the category of Dance, complimenting it as "another dead catchy radio-friendly tune". A reviewer from The Network Forty called it a "perfect uptempo fun springtime" track. Newcastle Journal named it "one of the best releases of the year." Stuart Bailie from NME felt Small "is out in the clear, happy and brilliant, her voice is a thrill, and nobody messes it up with dopey flutes, or any of the other dance gimmicks. A blinder." Reading Evening Post described it as "funky". James Hamilton from the Record Mirror Dance Update named it a "stunningly catchy "nothing can stop me" chanter". Tom Doyle from Smash Hits gave it four out of five, adding, "'One Night in Heaven' proved M People are the finest exponents of the party garage sound. 'Moving On Up' is in much the same vein, except it's better, being a proper happy happy disco record." Jonathan Bernstein from Spin complimented Small's "smoky" alto on the "anthemic hit-the-road brio" of the song. Steve Pick from St. Louis Post-Dispatch commented, "You can hear a straight line from the Stereo MC's 'Connected' to this, a deep, in-the-pocket groove featuring a jazzy, funky break in the middle and, of course, subtle tenor saxophone honks. The big difference, aside from the fact that this one isn't quite as catchy, is the presence of a big-voiced disco diva whose alto tones conjure up dim memories of Donna Summer, especially on the soaring, nearly exuberant chorus."

== Music video ==
A music video was produced to promote the single, directed by John Clayton and released in September 1993. It features M People performing the song in a club. In the beginning, Small is seen arriving the club. At the same time a couple also arrives. Small begins to sing, standing in the crowd of dancing people. The couple then starts arguing and the man begins to dance with another woman from the bar. Small then goes up to her band on the scene and continues singing, while the man's girlfriend starts yelling on him and leaves. He continues dancing with the woman from the bar. A cat appears on the bar counter, being patted by the guests, and a lizard lies by the phone. Suddenly the girlfriend shows up, throwing the content of a glass on her boyfriend and smiling at him. The video ends with M People continuing playing on the scene, while the people are dancing. "Moving On Up" received active rotation on MTV Europe in January 1994. It was nominated for Best Clip of the Year and Best New Artist Clip of the Year, both in the category for Dance at the 1994 Billboard Music Video Awards.

== Impact and legacy ==
In 2011, Australian music channel Max included "Moving On Up" in their list of the "1000 Greatest Songs of All Time".

In 2014, Idolator picked it as one of "The 50 Best Pop Singles of 1994". John Hamilton praised it as "a confident pop-soul kiss-off", adding that "its funky sax and Small’s pissed-off vocals combined to create nothing short of a club classic, one that provided ample opportunity for gay and straight clubbers alike to bust a move on dancefloors across the nation."

In 2017, American entertainment company BuzzFeed ranked it number 63 in their list of "The 101 Greatest Dance Songs of the '90s".

Use of the song at the 2022 Conservative Party Conference, to accompany the entrance of Liz Truss, drew strong criticism from the song's writer Mike Pickering, who said the band was "livid". Pickering said that the band had contacted their lawyers but had been advised "there was little that could be done." The song had also been used by Tony Blair and the Labour Party in the 1990s. Pickering said that he hoped Truss took note of the lyrics, as the song was "about, 'go and pack your bags and get out'" and taking a "sip from the devil's cup".

== Track listings ==
=== UK release ===
- Cassette single – 74321 16616 4
- 7-inch single – 74321 16616 7
1. "Moving On Up" (M People Master Edit) – 3:34
2. "Moving On Up" (M People Dub) – 4:35
- 12-inch single – 74321 16616 1
1. "Moving On Up" (M People Master Mix) – 5:29
2. "Moving On Up" (M People Dub) – 4:35
3. "Moving On Up" (Roger S. Gospel Revival Mix) – 5:55
4. "Moving On Up" (Roger S. Moving Mix) – 6:26
- CD single – 74321 16616 2
1. "Moving On Up" (M People Master Edit) – 3:34
2. "Moving On Up" (M People Master Mix) – 5:29
3. "Moving On Up" (M People Dub) – 4:35
4. "Moving On Up" (Roger S. Gospel Revival Mix) – 5:55
5. "Moving On Up" (Roger S. Moving Mix) – 6:26

=== US release ===
- Cassette single – 34T 77392
1. "Moving On Up" (M People Master Edit) – 3:34
2. "Moving On Up" (Gospel Revival Edit) – 3:52
- 12-inch single – 49 77417
1. "Moving On Up" (MK Movin' Mix) – 7:38
2. "Moving On Up" (N.Y. Underground Mix) – 6:55
3. "Moving On Up" (M People Master Mix) – 5:29
4. "Moving On Up" (MK Like a Man Dub) – 6:57
5. "Moving On Up" (Roger S. Hardubb) – 4:25
- CD single – 49K 77417
1. "Moving On Up" (M People Master Edit) – 3:34
2. "Moving On Up" (M People Master Mix) – 5:29
3. "Moving On Up" (MK Movin' Mix) – 7:38
4. "Moving On Up" (Roger S. Gospel Revival Mix) – 5:55
5. "Someday" (Sasha's Full Master) – 7:39

== Charts ==
=== Weekly charts ===
Weekly chart performance for "Moving On Up"
Chart (1993–1994)	Peak position
Australia (ARIA)	4
Austria (Ö3 Austria Top 40)	17
Belgium (Ultratop 50 Flanders)	18
Belgium (VRT Top 30 Flanders)	17
Canada Top Singles (RPM)	23
Canada Dance/Urban (RPM)	1
Denmark (IFPI)	18
Europe (Eurochart Hot 100)	12
Europe (European Hit Radio)	8
Finland (Suomen virallinen lista)	6
France (SNEP)	3
Germany (GfK)	21
Greece (Pop + Rock)	4
Iceland (Íslenski Listinn Topp 40)	34
Ireland (IRMA)	4
Israel (Israeli Singles Chart)	5
Netherlands (Dutch Top 40)	12
Netherlands (Single Top 100)	11
New Zealand (Recorded Music NZ)	4
Quebec (ADISQ)	10
Sweden (Sverigetopplistan)	20
Switzerland (Schweizer Hitparade)	19
UK Singles (Official Charts)	2
UK Airplay (Music Week)	1
UK Dance (Music Week)	1
UK Club Chart (Music Week)	1
US Billboard Hot 100	34
US Dance Club Play (Billboard)	1
US Maxi-Singles Sales (Billboard)	4
US Top 40/Mainstream (Billboard)	14
US Top 40/Rhythm-Crossover (Billboard)	33
US Cash Box Top 100	16

Chart (2016)	Peak position
Poland Airplay (ZPAV)	77

=== Year-end charts ===
Year-end chart performance for "Moving On Up"
Chart (1993)	Rank
Europe (Eurochart Hot 100)	71
Netherlands (Dutch Top 40)	103
Sweden (Topplistan)	86
UK Singles (OCC)	36
UK Airplay (Music Week)	5
UK Club Chart (Music Week)	59

Chart (1994)	Rank
Australia (ARIA)	21
Canada Dance/Urban (RPM)	2
France (SNEP)	25
New Zealand (RIANZ)	27
US Dance Club Play (Billboard)	2
US Maxi-Singles Sales (Billboard)	15

== Certifications ==
Certifications and sales for "Moving On Up"
Region	Certification	Certified units/sales
Australia (ARIA)	Platinum	70,000^{^}
New Zealand (RMNZ)	Gold	5,000^{*}
United Kingdom (BPI)	Gold	400,000^{‡}
^{*} Sales figures based on certification alone.^{^} Shipments figures based on certification alone.^{‡} Sales+streaming figures based on certification alone.

== Other versions ==
"Moving On Up" was also a dance hit for Belgian singer Roselle in 1995. The chorus is interpolated in the song "Gloves" by Australian comedy group Thanks Pet, Next, a hidden track on their EP Frogstamp, which satirises invasive body searching. In that context, the phrase "moving on up" becomes a double entendre.

== In popular culture ==
"Moving On Up" has been featured in many films, including the British blockbuster The Full Monty, The Next Karate Kid, the American comedies The First Wives Club and Are We Done Yet? and Danny Boyle's psychological thriller Trance. In February 1998, the song was featured in an episode of Top Gear, during the reviews of the Citroën Xantia, Vauxhall Vectra, Peugeot 406, Subaru Legacy and the Volkswagen Passat, with a voice over by presenter Jeremy Clarkson.
