= Don't Look Any Further =

1984 single by Dennis Edwards

Single by Dennis Edwards featuring Siedah Garrett

from the album Don't Look Any Further
- B-side: "I Thought I Could Handle It"
- Released: April 3, 1984
- Studio: Soundcastle Studios (Silver Lake, California)
- Genre: R&B
- Length: 4:02
- Label: Motown
- Songwriters: Franne Golde; Dennis Lambert; Duane Hitchings
- Producer: Dennis Lambert

Dennis Edwards singles chronology
"I Didn't Have To (But I Did)" (1966)	"Don't Look Any Further" (1984)	"(You're My) Aphrodisiac" (1984)

Music video
- "Don't Look Any Further (Official Video)" on YouTube

"Don't Look Any Further" is a song by American singer Dennis Edwards featuring American singer-songwriter Siedah Garrett, released in April 1984 by Motown from the singer's debut album by the same name (1984). The song is written by Franne Golde, Dennis Lambert and Duane Hitchings, while Lambert produced it. It peaked at No. 2 on the US Billboard Black Singles chart and No. 72 on the Billboard Hot 100. On the UK singles chart, the song peaked at No. 45.

Guitar, bass and drum programming were by Paul Jackson Jr.

== Sampling ==
The recording is renowned for having been sampled by many prominent artists.

- The 1986 single "City Lights" by William Pitt, which was a European hit, uses the same bassline and chord structure.
- The first well-known sample of the song's distinctive bassline is in Eric B. & Rakim's 1987 single "Paid in Full".
- 2Pac's diss song "Hit 'Em Up", the B-side to his 1996 single "How Do U Want It", also samples "Don't Look Any Further".
- R&B group TLC sampled the song on the track "Das da Way We Like 'Em", which was released and appeared on their 1992 debut album, Ooooooohhh... On the TLC Tip, and seven years later, the group also sampled the bassline on the remix of "Unpretty" under the title "Don't Look Any Further Remix" in 1999.
- The Notorious B.I.G. and Junior M.A.F.I.A. also sampled "Don't Look Any Further" for their song "Gettin' Money (The Get Money Remix)."
- Australian hip hop group The Herd sampled the bassline in their song, "77%".
- Rob Base and DJ E-Z Rock also sampled the bassline in their song "Make It Hot".
- Actress-singer Tichina Arnold sampled "Don't Look Any Further" for her song "Anyway You Wanna Be".
- Rapper Lil Wayne sampled "Don't Look Any Further" on his 2002 single "Way of Life". It features Big Tymers and TQ and appears on his album 500 Degreez.
- Rapper Z-Ro sampled the song in "Mo City Don (Freestyle)" off his album Let the Truth Be Told.
- Rapper Snoop Dogg sampled the song in "New Jackson" (De Sean Jackson Theme Song)" and in the song "Paper'd Up".
- Aloe Blacc uses a simplified version of the bass in "Love Is the Answer".
- Gospel duo Mary Mary interpolated the bass on their hit single "Shackles (Praise You)", produced by Warryn Campbell featured on their 2000 debut album, Thankful.
- Rapper Yung Gravy used a "Whoa" vocal sample from the song in "1 Thot 2 Thot Red Thot Blue Thot".
- SG Lewis uses a sample of the song in “Time” from his debut album Times.
- British DJ PAWSA samples multiple elements of "Don't Look Any Further" in his 2024 song "Too Cool to be Careless".
- Memphis rapper NLE Choppa uses samples from this song in his 2025 diss song “KO”.

== Music video ==
The low budget music video for the song has been described as "what ... might be the worst video ever".

It was shot in the basement at Motown Records the cost was $12.50 according to Siedah Garrett.

== Whitney Houston and Jermaine Jackson version ==
There is video footage of a young Whitney Houston recording the song with Jermaine Jackson that appeared on the tv show "Entertainment Tonight" in the mid 1980s. It appears she recorded the song. It was never released. It is unclear if the pair recorded it before or after the song was released by another artist in 1984. Whitney Houston and Jermaine Jackson might have recorded it in the same studio session as "If You Say My Eyes Are Beautiful", which appeared on her debut LP and his album.

== Kane Gang version ==
In 1988, British blue-eyed soul/sophisti-pop group the Kane Gang took their version to number 52 on the UK Singles Chart, and number 64 on the US Billboard Hot 100. Kane Gang's rendition of "Don't Look Any Further" was number one on the US dance charts for one week, and was their sole entry on the chart.

=== Track listing ===
- US 7-inch vinyl

A. "Don't Look Any Further"
B. "I Thought I Could Handle It"

== M People version ==
"Don't Look Any Further"

Single by M People

from the album Elegant Slumming
- B-side: "Remixes, La Vida Loca"
- Released: November 22, 1993
- Genre: Pop; soul
- Length: 3:26 (single edit); 3:51 (album version)
- Label: Deconstruction
- Songwriters: Franne Golde; Dennis Lambert; Duane Hitchings
- Producer: M People

M People singles chronology
"Moving On Up" (1993)	"Don't Look Any Further" (1993)	"Renaissance" (1994)

Music video
- "Don't Look Any Further" on YouTube

British band M People released their cover of "Don't Look Any Further" as the third single from their second album, Elegant Slumming (1993), released on November 22 by Deconstruction Records. The song, produced by the band, peaked at number nine on the UK Singles Chart, and numbers one and three on the Music Week Airplay and Dance Singles chart respectively. In Iceland, "Don't Look Any Further" peaked at number two, while in New Zealand, it reached number four. The music video for the song was directed by Jeff Baynes and filmed in Berlin, Germany.

=== Composition and arrangement ===
Lead singer Heather Small sings the lead part of the song which was originally sung by Dennis Edwards, while bandmate Mark Bell sings the part originally sung by Siedah Garrett. Small slightly alters the third line of the first verse: "What you need is a lover, someone to take over. Oh babe, don’t look any further" instead of singing: "What you need is lover, a man to take over. Oh girl, don’t look any further".

=== Critical reception ===
The song received a positive reception from critics. Andy Beevers from Music Week named M People's cover of "Don't Look Any Further" Pick of the Week in the category of Dance, giving it four out of five and writing, "It is disappointing to find M People releasing a cover when their recent self-penned material has been strong. Their version of the Dennis Edwards classic sees them moving downtempo into soul rather than house territory. Although it is not as good as the original, the single should still sell well on both the strength of the outfit's growing reputation and the sheer quality of the composition." Iestyn George from NME noted "the memory lane revivalism" of the track, praising Heather Small, who "belts it out with such gusto that she puts the likes of Dina Carroll and Shara Nelson to shame."

=== Chart performance ===
The song became the fourth consecutive top-10 hit for the band and their third consecutive top 10 from the Elegant Slumming album. It charted and peaked at number nine, spending five weeks in the top 20 with weekly sales starting at 82,000 copies and it continued to sell over 60,000 copies in each of the following four weeks.

The song spent a total of 10 weeks on the chart, leaving in early February 1994. "Don't Look Any Further" therefore had the second longest chart sojourn of any M People single, after the 11 weeks of both predecessor singles. In Iceland, the single reached number two. Elsewhere, they secured their second consecutive top-5 hit in New Zealand where it peaked at number four and stayed in the chart for 18 weeks. In Switzerland, it took the single seven weeks to peak at number 23, but stayed in the Swiss Top 40 for 18 weeks in total. On the Eurochart Hot 100, "Don't Look Any Further" both debuted and peaked at number 23 on 11 December 1993, after charting in Ireland and the UK.

=== Music video ===
The accompanying music video for "Don't Look Any Further" utilises the single edit and was directed by Jeff Baynes. The video was filmed over two days in Germany's capital of Berlin on October 26 and 27, 1993 while the band was still promoting "Moving On Up"'s success around Europe. Landmarks seen included the Brandenburg Gate, the Berlin Wall, Marx-Engels Forum, Berlin Cathedral, the Kaiser Wilhelm Memorial Church and the Fernsehturm (the TV Tower in Alexanderplatz) are all featured within the video adding to the atmospheric backdrop seen in a misty haze. It was A-listed on German music television channel VIVA in February 1994.

The external shots show Heather Small walking around the cold city centre as is also Mark Bell who is never seen singing with Small but they seem to pass each other at various points without realising while walking around town. Other band members are also seen chatting to each other under bridges, whilst Small seems oblivious to their existence.

Other internal shots show both Small and Bell leaning up against separate opposing walls and later are seen in a split-screen effect singing their duet but, again, never directly to each other. During the final chorus, Small is seated in a quiet German pub alone at a table at the fore and in the background, other band members are seated around another table and they join in to sing the chorus. In this final scene, the camera continues to pan horizontally from right to left and back repeatedly as the four main members of the band all sing together.

=== Artwork ===
One of the four sofas as seen on the Elegant Slumming album cover is featured on the cover of this single on its own. It is this particular pink sofa that Heather Small was sat on on the cover of the parent album and her not being there incorporates the idea of "look(ing) no further" and finding no one there, in total contrast to the previous single "Moving On Up" when it was just a side profile of Small that made up the artwork.

=== Track listings ===
- Cassette single – 74321 17711 4
- 7-inch single – 74321 17711 7
1. "Don't Look Any Further" (M People Master Edit) – 3:28
2. "La Vida Loca" (Album version) – 4:32
- 12-inch single – 74321 17711 1
1. "Don't Look Any Further" (M People Master Mix) – 5:28
2. "Don't Look Any Further" (Strip to the Bone Mix) – 5:28
3. "Don't Look Any Further" (Danny D Mix) – 5:38
4. "La Vida Loca" (Album version) – 4:32
- CD single – 74321 17711 2
1. "Don't Look Any Further" (M People Master Edit) – 3:28
2. "Don't Look Any Further" (Strip to the Bone Mix) – 5:28
3. "Don't Look Any Further" (Danny D Mix) – 5:38
4. "La Vida Loca" (Album version) – 4:32

=== Charts ===
==== Weekly charts ====
Chart (1993–1994)	Peak position
Australia (ARIA)	75
Austria (Ö3 Austria Top 40)	25
Belgium (Ultratop 50 Flanders)	33
Belgium (VRT Top 30 Flanders)	17
Europe (Eurochart Hot 100)	23
Europe (European AC Radio)	4
Europe (European Hit Radio)	4
Finland (Suomen virallinen lista)	19
Germany (GfK)	29
Iceland (Íslenski Listinn Topp 40)	2
Ireland (IRMA)	16
Israel (Israeli Singles Chart)	6
Netherlands (Dutch Top 40 Tipparade)	18
Netherlands (Single Top 100)	43
New Zealand (Recorded Music NZ)	4
Switzerland (Schweizer Hitparade)	23
Sweden (Sverigetopplistan)	29
UK Singles (Official Charts)	9
UK Airplay (Music Week)	1
UK Dance (Music Week)	3
UK Club Chart (Music Week)	10

==== Year-end charts ====
Chart (1993)	Position
UK Singles (OCC)	86

Chart (1994)	Position
Germany (Media Control)	98
Iceland (Íslenski Listinn Topp 40)	61
New Zealand (RIANZ)	30
