= M People =

English house music band

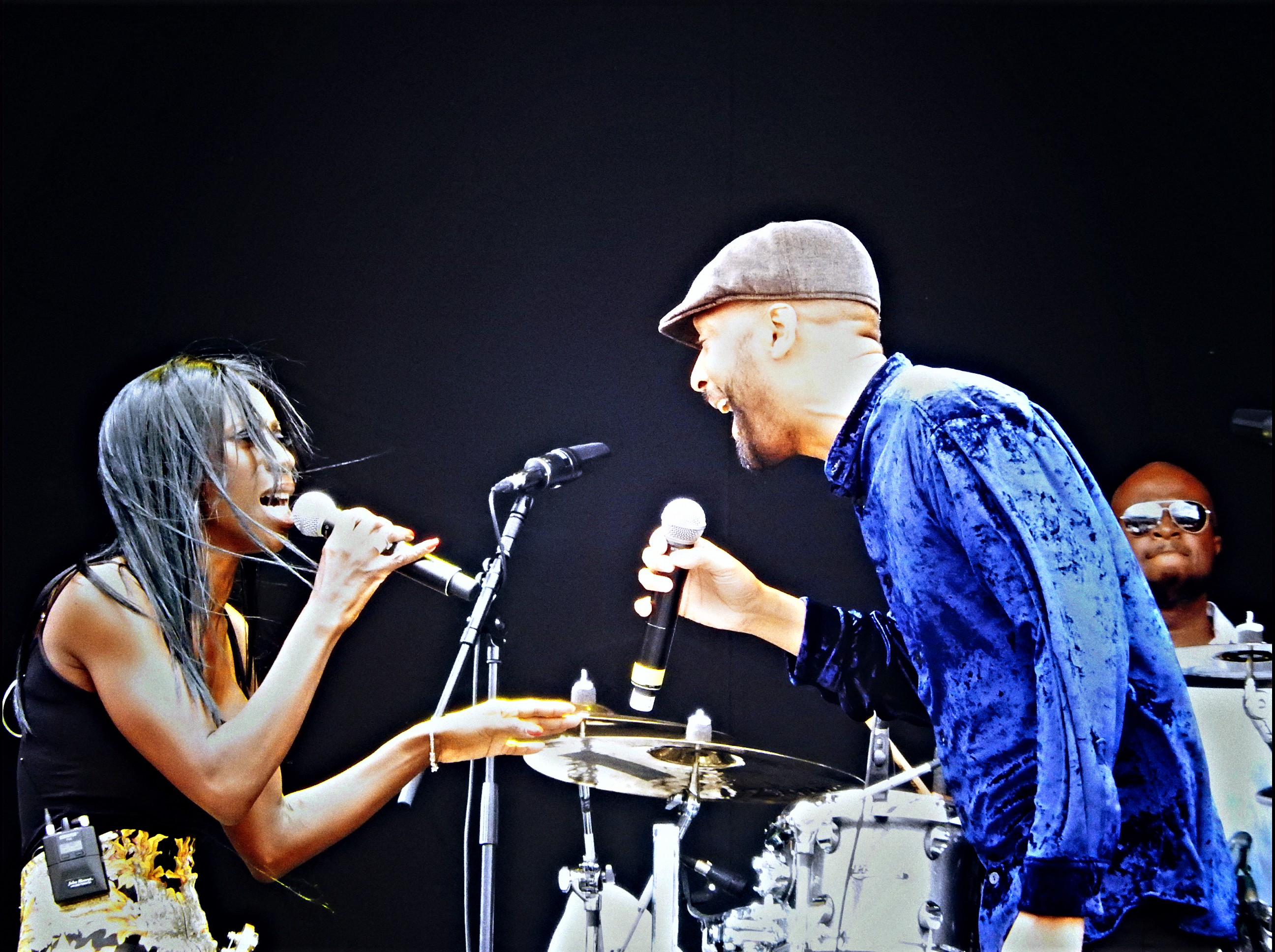
- M People, V Festival 2014, Chelmsford

Background information
- Origin: Manchester, England
- Genres: House; dance
- Years active: 1990–1999; 2006–present
- Labels: Deconstruction (1990–1997); M People Records (1997–1998)
- Members: Heather Small; Mike Pickering; Paul Heard; Shovell

M People (stylised as ^{M}People) are an English dance music band that formed in 1990 and achieved success throughout most of the 1990s. The name M People is derived from the first letter of the first name of band member Mike Pickering, who formed the group. In December 2016, Billboard magazine ranked them as the 83rd most successful dance act of all time. As of 2021, M People have sold over 11 million records worldwide.

== Career ==
=== Formation ===
Pickering had been a member of Factory Records dance act Quando Quango, but became better known as one of the original DJs at The Haçienda. Paul Heard was a member of acid jazz band Ace of Clubs, and Shovell had previously been in the collective Natural Life. The original plan had been to have a roster of different singers for different songs, but having been spotted by Pickering and Heard, Heather Small became the distinctive vocalist of the group. She had been in the English soul band Hot House, which had released a number of critically acclaimed records without achieving any major success.

=== Northern Soul and breakthrough ===
Their first release came in the form of "Colour My Life", a limited white label pressing that gained them some recognition, but it was the first official single "How Can I Love You More?" that gave them their first Top 30 hit and a following in and around the Manchester club scene, where Pickering was still DJing. Their first album, Northern Soul, was released in March 1992. It provided other singles, including a full release of "Colour My Life", "Someday" and "Excited", followed by a re-release and repackaging of the album.

=== Elegant Slumming and success ===
1993 began with the re-released and remixed single from 1991’s "How Can I Love You More?", which was issued at the end of January and gave the band their first Top 10 single, peaking at number 8. While this single was in the chart, the band were working on new material for the second album to be released that autumn; a preliminary single, "One Night in Heaven", was released in the summer and peaked at number 6. It provided them with a dance/pop success that paved the way for a bigger worldwide hit with the second single, "Moving On Up". The album Elegant Slumming entered the Top 5 on release and peaked at No. 2, remaining on the chart until the following summer and later winning the band a Mercury Music Prize. A further two Top 10 singles followed: "Don't Look Any Further" (a cover of the Dennis Edwards song, the video for which was shot in Berlin) in December, and "Renaissance", which was used as the theme tune to the BBC 2 show, The Living Soap, sending the single to number 5 in the UK Singles Chart.

=== Bizarre Fruit II and awards ===
In 1994 and 1995, M People won the BRIT Award for Best British Dance Act, the latter as a result of the release of Bizarre Fruit. The first single from that album was "Sight for Sore Eyes", which climbed to number 6, helping the album to enter the UK Albums Chart, peak at No. 4, and remain in the Top 10 for four months into the following year. The second single from the album was "Open Your Heart", which became their seventh consecutive Top Ten hit in two years, and at the Brit Awards '95 they collaborated with Sting on his track "If You Love Somebody Set Them Free". Their third single, "Search for the Hero", was later used in the TV advertising campaign for the Peugeot 406. The song reached number 9 in the chart.

In 1995, the band embarked on their first world tour, entitled the Come Again Tour, and two more singles were lifted from a re-issued album: Bizarre Fruit II, which charted and peaked one place higher at number 3; these singles were a remixed "Love Rendezvous" and "Itchycoo Park". The former was the least successful single from the album, charting at number 32, and the latter was a cover of The Small Faces' 1967 single, which charted at number 11, although the choice of the latter song to cover drew negative comments from the media.

In the United States, their biggest success was on the Hot Dance Music/Club Play chart, where they achieved five Top 5 singles, four of which reached number one.

After touring and promotion of Bizarre Fruit II for 18 months, the band took a break in 1996. The album, having been released in November 1995, did not leave the chart until April 1997, becoming one of the biggest-selling albums of the decade. They made some outdoor live UK performances called the Summer M Parties in June 1996, at Crystal Palace, Alton Towers, plus a televised performance on BBC 1 on 29 June 1996 from Old Trafford, Manchester for The Crowd are on the Pitch: The Euro '96 Extravaganza, where they performed along with bands Dodgy, Madness and fellow Mancunians Simply Red, and comedians Nick Hancock and Jo Brand, to a crowd of 60,000 at a party celebrating the Euro 1996 football championships.

=== Return and Fresco ===
In March 1997, lead singer Heather Small gave birth to her son. With the closure of the deConstruction label by BMG in 1996, the band founded their own record label, M People Records, to release their forthcoming album. In September, they released the lead single "Just for You", which peaked at number 8 on the chart, and two weeks later, their album Fresco, was released and entered the UK Albums Chart at number 2, going on to sell 1.1 million copies and being certified platinum. The band achieved their third multi-platinum selling album and this time appeared on Jools Holland's BBC 2 show, performing album tracks "Never Mind Love", "Angel St", and Small also performed, solo, the million-selling charity single that she appeared on, "Perfect Day".

Fresco also featured the single "Fantasy Island" (number 33) and the band went on a fifteen-date UK tour supporting the album, receiving rave reviews. The final single lifted from the album was "Angel St", which reached number 8 and earned them their tenth Top 10 chart hit in March 1998, making the band one of the most consistent hit-makers of the 1990s in terms of both sales and airplay.

=== The Best of M People ===
In the middle of 1998, the band prepared for their fifth album, a compilation entitled The Best of M People, which also contained three new tracks: "Testify", "Dreaming" and a cover of the Doobie Brothers classic "What a Fool Believes". The album went on to sell 1.75 million copies, peaked at number 2, and was certified 3× platinum. Of the three new tracks, "Testify" and "Dreaming" were released as singles. "Testify" reached number 12 in October 1998, and "Dreaming" reached number 13 in February 1999, marking their eighteenth and final single to date.

After the release of The Best of M People, the band took an extended hiatus. Heather Small recorded a successful solo album, Proud, and it seemed that the band had split. However, a re-packaged greatest hits album entitled Ultimate Collection was released in 2005, leading the band to embark on a short promotional tour of the UK. Small continued to pursue a solo career, releasing her second solo album, Close to a Miracle, in 2006.

M People toured again in 2007 as part of the Forestry Commission's 2007 Forest Tours at Delamere Forest, Cheshire; Dalby Forest, North Yorkshire Moors; Thetford Forest, Suffolk; and Westonbirt Arboretum, Wiltshire, to support The Forestry Commission's social and environmental programmes. Small said, "We have played in many different locations but never in forests, so we’re really looking forward to doing these gigs". In addition to these gigs, M People performed at the Hampton Court Festival in Surrey, London, on 12 June 2007, and the Chichester Real Ale and Jazz festival on 4 July 2007. Elsewhere, they played a concert in Warsaw, Poland, on 7 September 2007. The band also played some festival dates in 2008 before Small starred as a contestant in that year's BBC1's Strictly Come Dancing in the UK.

In 2012, as part of a series of Summer Concerts in Kew Gardens from 3–8 July, M People were one of five acts performing live on each day of the five days. The other acts included Status Quo, Will Young, James Morrison and the Gipsy Kings. M People performed a 60-minute set on Wednesday 4 July, supported by Chic featuring Nile Rodgers.

=== 2013 Greatest Hits Tour ===
In April 2013, it was announced that the band would undertake an extensive fourteen-date Greatest Hits Tour in October to mark 20 years since the release of the Mercury Music Prize-winning album Elegant Slumming. This was the band's first UK tour since 2005's Ultimate Collection Tour, although Pickering did not take part.

=== 2020 Box Set ===
In 2019, it was announced that a box set of the M People catalogue was scheduled to be released. The box set, titled Renaissance, was released in March 2020 and included all five of the group's albums, as well as a large selection of bonus remixes and two DVDs that presented the group's music videos and live performances from the Come Again tour. Also included was a book with notes from the band, rare photos, and a handwritten copy of the lyrics to "Search for the Hero".

== Members ==
- Heather Small (born 20 January 1965, London) – vocals (1990–present)
- Mike Pickering (born 21 February 1954, Manchester) – keyboards, programming, piano, saxophone, vocals (1990–present)
- Paul Heard (born 5 October 1960, London) – keyboards, programming, piano, tambourine (1990–present)
- Shovell (born Andrew Lovell, 11 February 1969, South East London) – percussion (1992–present)

Session saxophonist Snake Davis provided saxophone for the band on songs such as "Moving on Up" and "Search for the Hero". He also acted as the live band's musical director.

== Discography ==
Studio albums

- Northern Soul (1992)
- Elegant Slumming (1993)
- Bizarre Fruit (1994)
- Bizarre Fruit II (1995)
- Fresco (1997)

Compilations and other albums

- The Best of M People (1998)
- Testify (1999)
- Ultimate Collection (2005)
- Ultimate Collection: The Remixes (2005)
- One Night in Heaven: The Best of M People (2007)

== Awards ==
=== Brit Awards ===
The Brit Awards are the British Phonographic Industry's annual pop music awards.

Year	Nominee / work	Award	Result
1994	M People	British Dance Act	Won
1994	M People	British Producer	Nominated
1994	M People	British Group	Nominated
1995	M People	British Group	Nominated
1995	M People	British Dance Act	Won
1996	M People	British Dance Act	Nominated

=== Ivor Novello Awards ===
The Ivor Novello Awards, named after the Cardiff born entertainer Ivor Novello, are awards for songwriting and composing. They are presented annually in London by the British Academy of Songwriters, Composers and Authors (BASCA) and were first introduced in 1955.

Year	Nominee / work	Award	Result
1994	"Moving On Up"	Best Contemporary Song	Nominated

=== Mercury Prize ===
The Mercury Prize is an annual music prize awarded for the best album from the United Kingdom and Ireland.

Year	Nominee / work	Award	Result
1994	Elegant Slumming	Mercury Prize	Won

=== NME Awards ===
The NME Awards are annual music awards show founded by the music magazine NME.

Year	Nominee / work	Award	Result
1996	M People	Best Dance Act	Nominated

=== Silver Clef Awards ===
The Silver Clef Award are an annual UK music awards lunch which has been running since 1976. M People has received one award.

Year	Nominee / work	Award	Result
1999	M People	Silver Clef Award	Won

== See also ==
- List of number-one dance hits (United States)
- List of artists who reached number one on the US Dance chart
