= Mike Pickering =

British musician and DJ (born 1954)

- Born: 21 February 1954 (age 72); Manchester, England
- Occupations: Disc jockey, record producer, executive, songwriter
- Labels: Deconstruction, Sony Music
- Spouse: Kate Shepherd (2021–present)

Mike Pickering (born 21 February 1954), is an English musician, DJ, songwriter and A&R executive.

== Career ==
Pickering was a DJ at The Haçienda's Nude and Hot nights, and later Shine. He worked for Factory Records, where he signed Happy Mondays, To Hell with Burgundy and James, among others. With Hillegonda Rietveld, he was joint founder, writer and producer of Quando Quango, and he later founded M People, for whom he wrote and produced many songs and played saxophone live.

In 2002 Pickering was one of the curators of New Order's box set Retro compiling the Club disc and contributing sleeve notes to the release.

Pickering then worked for 20 years as A&R within the Columbia label of Sony BMG, where he worked with the Gossip, Calvin Harris, Kasabian, and the Ting Tings.

== In other media ==
Pickering appeared as himself in the film 24 Hour Party People. He supports Manchester City Football Club, and appeared in the documentary film about the club, Blue Moon Rising in 2010 alongside Noel Gallagher.
