= Deconstruction Records =

British record label

- Parent company: Sony Music; BMG (former)
- Founded: 1987
- Founder: Pete Hadfield; Keith Blackhurst; Mike Pickering
- Country of origin: England
- Location: London

Deconstruction Records is a British record label founded in 1987 by Pete Hadfield and Keith Blackhurst, together with Mike Pickering of M People. According to DJ Magazine it is "best remembered for marrying underground credibility and diversity with an open-minded attitude towards pop".

== Artists ==
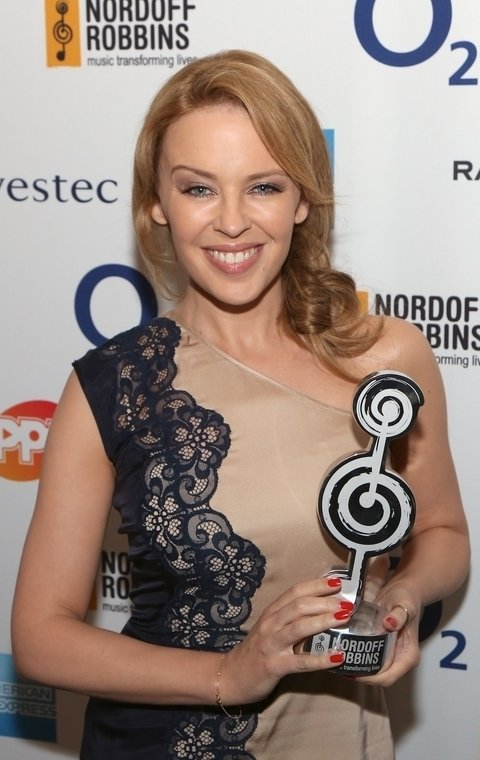
Kylie Minogue

It initially specialised in house anthems such as K Klass's "Rhythm Is a Mystery" and Bassheads' "Is There Anybody Out There?", as well as M People's output, but also had a record in promoting underground dance acts such as Dave Clarke. Hits included Robert Miles' UK No. 2 hit "Children", Felix's twice UK top ten hit "Don't You Want Me" and Italian techno act U.S.U.R.A.'s UK No. 7 hit, "Open Your Mind".

It was home to Kylie Minogue in the mid-late 1990s, when working with Saint Etienne, Brothers in Rhythm (who produced her single "Confide in Me"), and others.

Among the other artists to record for the company were Guru Josh, Black Box, M People, Way Out West, Sasha, Jam Machine and Republica. It also released recordings by Lionrock, Death in Vegas and Dub Pistols through its Concrete Records subsidiary.

== Commercial history ==
Distribution was via label deals with Parlophone, for acts such as K-Klass and Bassheads, and RCA Records for everybody else (although M People had a separate deal with Epic in the United States, but had its primary label attached to their releases Stateside). It was acquired by BMG in 1993, and its operations reduced in 1998, with M People gaining its own M People Records label for the release of its Fresco album. Sony Music then acquired BMG's stake in Sony BMG Music Entertainment in 2008, which led to the closure of both Deconstruction and Concrete.

== Orthography ==
Deconstruction Records was written a number of ways, including

- De Construction Records (pre BMG releases)
- deConstruction Records
- Deconstruction Records

== 2009 re-launch ==
Sony and Three Six Zero Group relaunched the label in July 2009, again under Mike Pickering; its first release was Sasha's "Xpander" in August 2009. They relaunched some of its back catalogue, and announced some new signings in late 2009, including Axwell, Diagram of the Heart, Retro/Grade and Way Out West. In May 2010, it was announced that Calvin Harris was signed the head of the A&R team at the newly relaunched Deconstruction label.
