= List of companies of Scotland =

Location of Scotland (in the United Kingdom and Europe)

Scotland is a country that is part of the United Kingdom and covers the northern third of the island of Great Britain.

Traditionally, the Scottish economy has been dominated by heavy industry underpinned by shipbuilding in Glasgow, coal mining and steel industries. Petroleum related industries associated with the extraction of North Sea oil have also been important employers from the 1970s, especially in the north-east of Scotland. Edinburgh is the financial services centre of Scotland, with many large banking and finance firms based there, including the Bank of Scotland, Lloyds Banking Group (owners of HBOS); the Government owned Royal Bank of Scotland and Standard Life.

Other notable companies based in Edinburgh include Rockstar North, whilst Glasgow, the countries largest city, is home to the International Financial Services District which houses offices of the Scottish Government, Morgan Stanley and JP Morgan Chase, and Buchanan Wharf, headquarters of Barclays in Europe. Glasgow also serves as the headquarters of other notable companies, including drinks manufacturer A.G. Barr. Other notable Scottish brands, such as Johnnie Walker, was established in Kilmarnock, and The Designer Rooms was established in Ayr. Popular clothing brands Lyle & Scott and Pringle of Scotland also originate from the country, whilst bus transportation company, Stagecoach Group, is based in Perth.

== Notable firms ==
This list includes notable companies with primary headquarters located in the country. The industry and sector follow the Industry Classification Benchmark taxonomy. Organizations which have ceased operations are included and noted as defunct.

The list includes notable companies as defined under the Companies Act 1985 and the Companies Act 2006, as well as other bodies such as limited liability partnerships and building societies.

Notable companies Status: P=Private, S=State; A=Active, D=Defunct
| Name | Industry | Sector | Headquarters | Founded | Notes | Status | |
|---|---|---|---|---|---|---|---|
| Aberdeen Group | Financials | Life insurance | Edinburgh | 1825 | Formerly Europe's largest mutual life assurance company | P | A |
| Aberdeen Asset Management | Financials | Asset managers | Aberdeen | 1983 | Asset management | P | A |
| Adam & Company | Financials | Banks | Edinburgh | 1983 | Bank | P | A |
| Aegon UK | Financials | Banks | Edinburgh | 1831 | Bank | P | A |
| A.G. Barr | Consumer goods | Soft drinks | Cumbernauld | 1875 | Soft drinks, including Irn-Bru and Tizer | P | A |
| Aggreko | Industrials | Electronic equipment | Glasgow | 1962 | Power generation equipment | P | A |
| Airdrie Savings Bank | Financials | Banks | Airdrie | 1835 | Bank | P | A |
| Albion Motors | Consumer goods | Automobiles | Glasgow | 1899 | Car manufacturer | P | A |
| Alexander Dennis | Industrials | Commercial vehicles & trucks | Larbert | 2004 | Bus manufacturer | P | A |
| Alliance Trust | Financials | Banks | Dundee | 1888 | Bank | P | A |
| Arran, Sense of Scotland | Cosmetics | Skin Care | Lamlash | 1989 | Beauty | P | A |
| Arnold Clark Automobiles | Consumer services | Motor vehicles | Glasgow | 1954 | Transportation | P | A |
| Apex Hotels | Consumer services | Hotels | Edinburgh | 1996 | Hotels | P | A |
| BAE Systems Maritime – Naval Ships | Industrials | Defence | Glasgow | 2008 | Military ships, part of BAE Systems and VT Group | P | A |
| Barr Construction | Industrials | Heavy construction | Paisley | 1898 | Construction | P | A |
| Baxters | Consumer goods | Food products | Fochabers | 1868 | Food producer | P | A |
| BBC Scotland | Consumer services | Broadcasting & entertainment | Glasgow | 1952 | National public broadcaster, part of the BBC | S | A |
| Britoil | Oil & gas | Exploration & production | Glasgow | 1975 | Oil and gas, part of BP | P | A |
| Business Stream | Utilities | Water | Edinburgh | 2006 | Water, part of Scottish Water | P | A |
| Cairn Energy | Oil & gas | Exploration & production | Edinburgh | 1981 | Oil and gas development | P | A |
| Caledonian Brewing Company | Consumer goods | Brewers | Edinburgh | 1869 | Brewery, part of Heineken International (Netherlands) | P | A |
| Caledonian MacBrayne | Consumer services | Travel & tourism | Gourock | 1851 | Ferry company operating on the west coast of Scotland, Scottish Government owned through David MacBrayne | S | A |
| Cashmaster International | Industrials | Industrial machinery | Dalgety Bay | 1977 | Money counting machines | P | A |
| Century Building Society | Financials | Banks | Edinburgh | 1899 | Bank, merged into Scottish Building Society in 2013 | P | D |
| Christian Salvesen | Industrials | Marine transportation | Leith | 1872 | Transportation, merged into Norbert Dentressangle (France) | P | D |
| Clyde Broadcast | Industrials | Electronic equipment | Clydebank | 1997 | Broadcasting equipment | P | A |
| Clydesdale Bank | Financials | Banks | Glasgow | 1838 | Commercial bank | P | A |
| Cupid plc | Technology | Internet | Edinburgh | 2005 | Dating websites | P | A |
| Dana Petroleum | Oil & gas | Exploration & production | Aberdeen | 1994 | North Sea exploration and production | P | A |
| DC Thomson | Consumer services | Publishing | Dundee | 1905 | Publisher of the Sunday Post, the Beano | P | A |
| Doosan Babcock | Industrials | Electronic equipment | Renfrew | 1891 | Power equipment | P | A |
| Drambuie | Consumer goods | Distillers & vintners | Glasgow | 1910 | Whisky producer | P | A |
| Dunfermline Building Society | Financials | Banks | Dunfermline | 1869 | Bank, building society | P | A |
| Edesix | Industrials | Electronic equipment | Edinburgh | 2002 | Body cameras | P | A |
| Edinburgh Woollen Mill | Consumer services | Apparel retailers | Langholm | 1947 | Clothing, knitwear retailer | P | A |
| Edrington | Consumer goods | Distillers & vintners | Glasgow | 1850 | Whisky producers | P | A |
| Farmfoods | Consumer services | Food retailers & wholesalers | Cumbernauld | 1955 | Frozen food supermarkets | P | A |
| FirstGroup | Consumer services | Travel & tourism | Aberdeen | 1995 | Passenger transportation | P | A |
| Forth Ports | Industrials | Transportation services | Edinburgh | 1967 | Port operator | P | A |
| German Doner Kebab | Consumer goods | Food products | Glasgow | 2017 | Fast casual kebab chain | P | A |
| Gleneagles Hotel | Consumer services | Hotels | Auchterarder | 1924 | Hotel | P | A |
| HBOS | Financials | Banks | Edinburgh | 2001 | Holding company of the Bank of Scotland, part of Lloyds Banking Group | P | A |
| Highland Spring | Consumer goods | Soft drinks | Blackford | 1979 | Bottled water supplier | P | A |
| Highlands and Islands Airports | Industrials | Transportation services | Inverness | 1986 | Airports, owned by the Scottish Government | S | A |
| Inver House | Consumer goods | Distillers & vintners | Airdrie | 1964 | Whisky producers | P | A |
| Jenners | Consumer services | Broadline retailers | Edinburgh | 1838 | Department stores, part of House of Fraser | P | A |
| Johnston Press | Consumer services | Publishing | Edinburgh | 1767 | Owner of The Scotsman | P | A |
| Kelvin Diesels | Industrials | Industrial machinery | Glasgow | 1904 | Motors | P | A |
| Kwik Fit | Consumer services | Specialized consumer services | Edinburgh | 1971 | Car repairs, mechanics | P | A |
| Linn Products | Industrials | Electronic equipment | Glasgow | 1973 | Audio equipment | P | A |
| Loganair | Consumer services | Airlines | Paisley | 1962 | Airline | P | A |
| Lothian Buses | Consumer services | Travel & tourism | Edinburgh | 1919 | Regional bus operator publicly-owned by Edinburgh City Council | S | A |
| Lyle & Scott | Customer services | Clothing | Hawick | 1874 | Clothing manufacturer and retailer | P | A |
| M&Co. | Consumer services | Apparel retailers | Inchinnan | 1834 | Clothing retailer | P | A |
| Megabus | Consumer services | Travel & tourism | Perth | 2003 | Low-cost inter-city bus operator | P | A |
| Menzies Aviation | Industrials | Delivery services | Edinburgh | 1833 | Logistics and distribution | P | A |
| Müller Milk & Ingredients | Consumer goods | Food products | East Kilbride | 1947 | Milk and dairy | P | A |
| NatWest Group | Financials | Banks | Edinburgh | 1969 | Banking and insurance, formerly Royal Bank of Scotland Group | P | A |
| NorthLink Ferries | Industrials | Marine transportation | Stromness | 2002 | Operator of ferries to the Northern Isles | P | A |
| Park's Motor Group | Consumer services | Travel & tourism | Hamilton | 1971 | Coach operator | P | A |
| Pelamis Wave Power | Oil & gas | Renewable energy equipment | Edinburgh | 1998 | Wave power equipment, defunct 2014 | P | D |
| Pringle of Scotland | Consumer goods | Clothing & accessories | Edinburgh | 1815 | Fashion | P | A |
| Realtime Worlds | Technology | Software | Dundee | 2002 | Game developer, defunct 2010 | P | D |
| RHA Audio | Technology | Audio electronics | Glasgow | 2008 | Personal headphones and audio electronics | P | A |
| Robert Noble | Consumer goods | Clothing & accessories | Killybegs | 1666 | Clothing, textiles | P | A |
| Rockstar North | Technology | Software | Edinburgh | 1984 | Game developer, part of Rockstar Games (US) | P | A |
| Royal Bank of Scotland | Financials | Banks | Edinburgh | 1727 | Bank, part of NatWest Group | P | A |
| Schuh | Consumer services | Apparel retailers | Livingston | 1981 | Footwear retailers | P | A |
| Scotmid | Consumer services | Food retailers & wholesalers | Edinburgh | 1859 | Scotland-wide supermarket chain | P | A |
| ScotRail | Consumer services | Travel & tourism | Glasgow | 2022 | Passenger rail operator | P | A |
| SSE | Utilities | Multiutilities | Perth | 1998 | Electricity and natural gas supplier | P | A |
| Scottish Building Society | Financials | Banks | Edinburgh | 1848 | Bank and building society | P | A |
| Scottish Citylink | Consumer services | Travel & tourism | Glasgow | 1985 | Inter-city coach operator | P | A |
| Scottish Friendly | Financials | Full line insurance | Glasgow | 1862 | Insurance and friendly society | P | A |
| Scottish Power | Utilities | Multiutilities | Glasgow | 1990 | Gas and electricity, part of Iberdrola (Spain) | P | A |
| Scottish Water | Utilities | Water | Dunfermline | 2002 | Public water utility owned by the Scottish Government | S | A |
| Scottish Widows | Financials | Investment services | Edinburgh | 1815 | Pensions, part of Lloyds Banking Group | P | A |
| Skyscanner | Technology | Internet | Edinburgh | 2001 | Flight aggregation website, part of Ctrip (China) | P | A |
| Stagecoach Group | Consumer services | Travel & tourism | Perth | 1980 | Bus and train operator | P | A |
| Stoats Porridge Bars | Consumer goods | Food products | Edinburgh | 2004 | Porridge providers | P | A |
| STV Group | Consumer services | Broadcasting & entertainment | Glasgow | 1957 | Formerly Scottish Media Group, owner of STV | P | A |
| Tesco Bank | Financials | Banks | Edinburgh | 1997 | Bank, part of Tesco | P | A |
| The Ashvale | Consumer services | Restaurants & bars | Aberdeen | 1979 | Fish and chip restaurant chain | P | A |
| The Carbon Removers | Oil & gas | Alternative energy | Dumfries | 2012 | Carbon capture, utilization, and storage | P | A |
| The Comedy Unit | Consumer services | Broadcasting & entertainment | Glasgow | 1996 | Sitcom and comedy developer | P | A |
| The Designer Rooms | Consumer goods | Homeware and furniture | Ayr | 2010 | Premium furniture and homeware | P | A |
| Thus | Telecommunications | Fixed line telecommunications | Glasgow | 1999 | Telecom, formerly known as Scottish Telecom | P | A |
| TSB Bank | Financials | Banks | Edinburgh | 1985 | Retail and commercial bank | P | A |
| Tunnock's | Consumer goods | Food products | Uddingston | 1890 | Biscuit and confectionery producer | P | A |
| Visioncall | Health care | Health care providers | Cambuslang | 1994 | Eye care chain | P | A |
| Walkers Shortbread | Consumer goods | Food products | Aberlour | 1898 | Shortbread, biscuit and cracker company | P | A |
| Wavegen | Oil & gas | Renewable energy equipment | Inverness | 1990 | Wave power equipment, defunct 2013 | P | D |
| Weir Group | Industrials | Industrial machinery | Glasgow | 1871 | Machinery | P | A |
| Wellpark Brewery | Consumer goods | Brewers | Glasgow | 1556 | Brewing company, part of C&C Group (Ireland) | P | A |
| Western Ferries | Consumer services | Marine transportation | Hunters Quay | 1868 | Operator of ferry services on the River Clyde | P | A |
| Whyte & Mackay | Consumer goods | Distillers & vintners | Glasgow | 1844 | Whisky producers | P | A |
| William Grant & Sons | Consumer goods | Distillers & vintners | Dufftown | 1887 | Whisky producers | P | A |
| Wolfson Microelectronics | Technology | Semiconductors | Edinburgh | 1984 | Fabless semiconductors, defunct 2014 | P | D |
| Wood Group | Oil & gas | Oil equipment & services | Aberdeen | 1982 | Oil and gas support | P | A |
| Wood Mackenzie | Industrials | Business support services | Edinburgh | 1973 | Analytics | P | A |

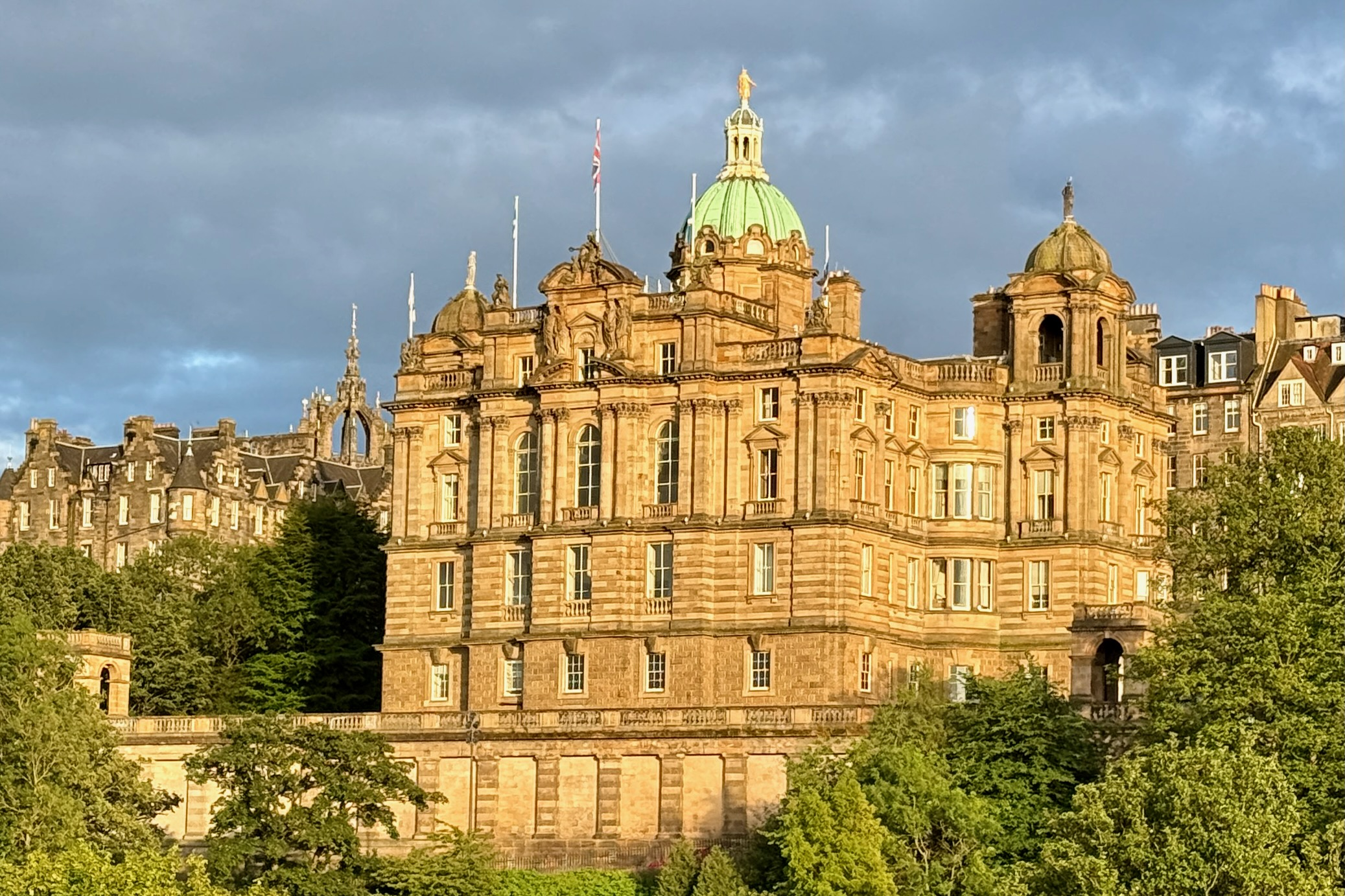
Headquarters for the Bank of Scotland in Edinburgh.

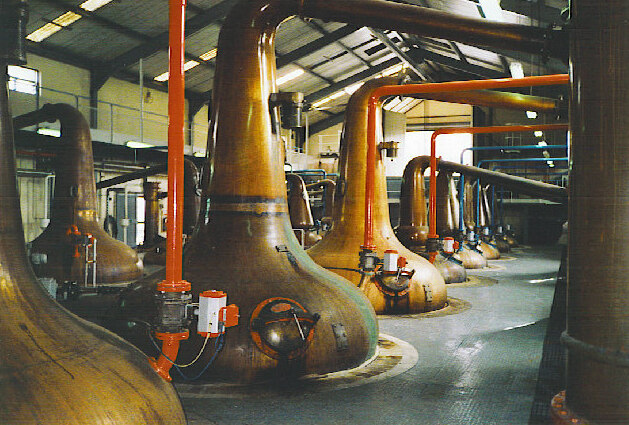
The Glenfiddich whisky distillery in Moray.

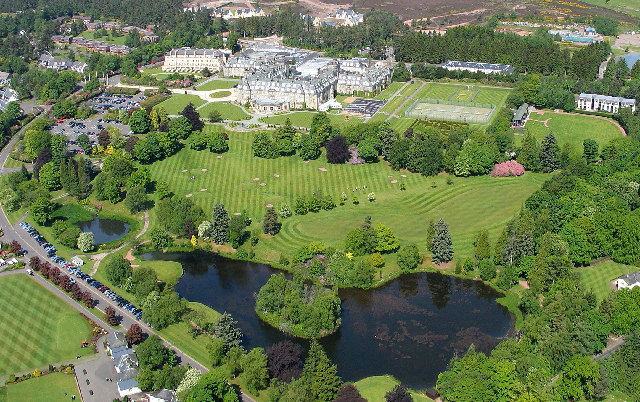
The Gleneagles Hotel grounds in Perthshire.

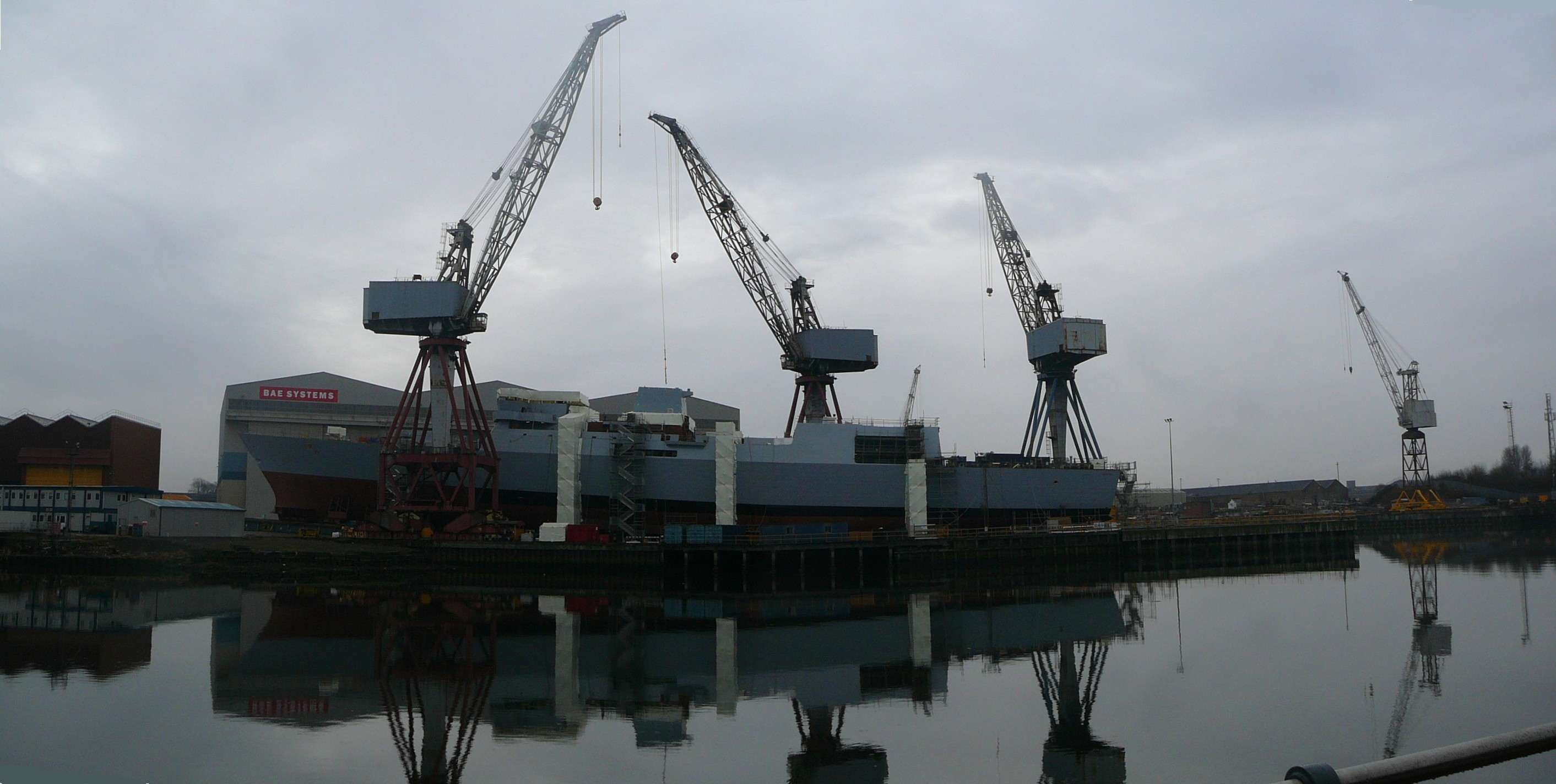
The Govan shipyard, part of BAE Systems Maritime – Naval Ships.

== See also ==
- Economy of Scotland
- List of restaurants in Scotland
- List of Scotland–based production companies
- Media in Scotland
