= WFM 91.7 =

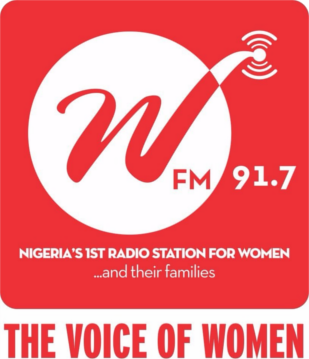
- Abeokuta; Nigeria
- Broadcast area: Arepo
- Frequency: 91.7 MHz
- Branding: WFM 91.7

Programming
- Language: English

Ownership
- Owner: Dr. Babatunde Okewale; Toun Okewale Sonaiya

Technical information
- Transmitter coordinates: 6°42′52.0″N 3°05′31.0″E

Links
- Website: wfm917.com

WFM 91.7 MHz is a Nigerian gender sensitive and specialized radio station licensed by Nigerian Broadcasting Commission (NBC) to broadcast programs for women and their family. It is the first female-oriented radio station in Sub-Saharan Africa. The station is owned by the duo of Dr. Babatunde Okewale and Toun Okewale Sonaiya and operated by Ive's communication. It is headquartered at Arepo community, Ogun State, South West, Nigeria. The broadcasting equipments were supplied by Clyde Broadcast, Glasgow, Scotland.

The test transmission of the station started on 29 October 2015. In the same vein, the first program of the station was aired to Nigerians on 16 November 2015. The station showcased Abisola Grace Aiyeola, Funmi Jinadu, and Bolatito Bez Idakula as the pioneer on-air personalities(OAP) for the station. The station was launched on 18 December 2015, in attendance were Aisha Buhari, Folorunsho Alakija, Dele Momodu and many other dignitaries in Nigeria.

The "Voice of Women Conference and Award" (VOW) is an annual award conceptualized by WFM 91.7 to celebrate notable Nigerian women. In the year 2016, the second version of this award was hosted at Eko Hotels and Suites, Lagos, Nigeria. One of the awardees at the event is Joe Odumakin who won the award of the person for the year.

The station is poised to focus on sports, business, politics, governance, economy, health, family, relationship issues, youth with women perspective. According to Toun in The Guardian (Nigeria) "We are very delighted to have the first women radio station in Nigeria and we have mapped our strategies to serve the people fantastic women related programmes. If you are a woman, mother, sister or a girl, WFM is the best station for you to listen to learn a lot and also to share your opinion about women issues."

== The launch of WFM 91.7 ==
=== Broadcasting ===
The station started test transmission in the month of November, 2015, with the mandate to broadcast gender sensitive program. The official launching of the radio station took place at Oriental Hotel in Lagos on 18 December 2015 with journalists, media practitioners and dignitaries from all over the country in attendance.

== Core on-air-personalities (OAP)s ==
WFM 91.7 started broadcasting with four personalities selected from over 5000 applicants who applied for the post to steer the operations of the station. The personalities were presented to the public on 9 September 2015 and they are:

=== Funmi Jinadu ===
She is a Nigerian female journalist, who studied broadcast journalism at the University of the West of England

=== Bolatito Bez Idakula ===
She is a Nigerian banker, writer and event planner. She married Bez, a Nigerian musician.

=== Abisola Grace Aiyeola ===
British-born Aiyeola participated in the first season of MTN sponsored Project Fame West Africa, which aired in 2008, finishing among the first five in the competition. She was first runner up in Big Brother Naija season 2 in 2017. She is a voice over artiste, singer and actress.

=== Chinedu Faith Nwaga ===
Faith holds a political science degree from the University of Lagos and an M.Sc. in international law and diplomacy. She holds a CCSA from Service Quality Institute of America and a certificate in entrepreneurship management from the Pan African University (LBS), Lagos.

== Voice of Women Conference and Award (VOW) ==
The VOW is an annual event organise by the radio station in Nigeria to discuss matters about women development and for recognition of outstanding personalities in womenfolk. The second edition of the award took place at Eko Hotel In the year 2016, it was chaired by Folorunsho Alakija tagged FACING OURFUTURE – TOGETHER. Award ceremony covers area like: Best Gender Empowering Company, Best Female in Business/Management, Best Family Focused Organization, Best Woman/Person/Organization of the Year, Lifetime Achievement Award, Best Government Organization/Agency Supporting Women and Their Families and the Best Civil Society Organization Supporting Women and their Families.
