= Crinkley Bottom =

Defunct British theme parks

- Crinkley Bottom logo

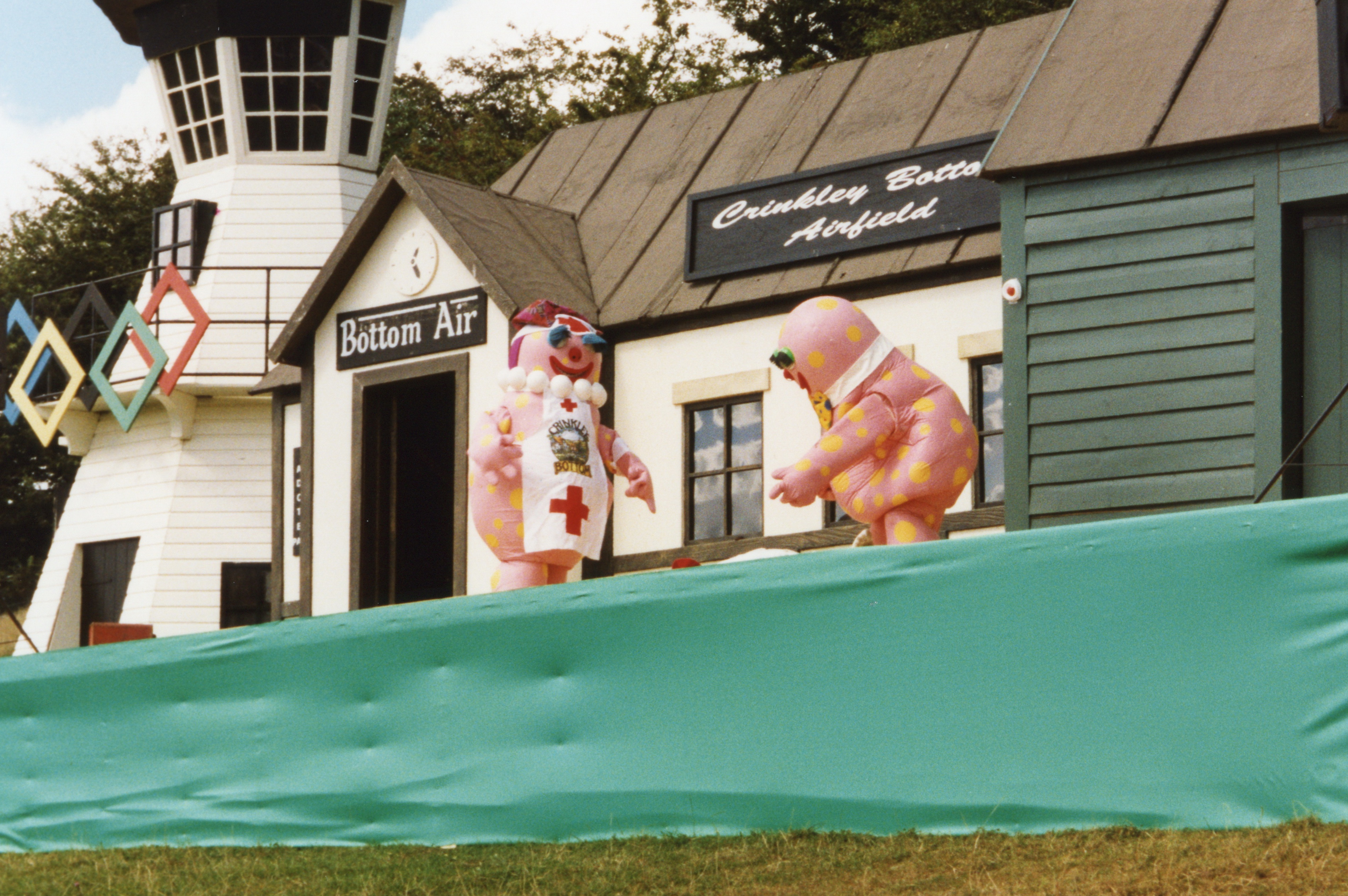
- Blobbyland at Crinkley Bottom, Cricket St Thomas
- Location: Cricket St Thomas, Somerset, Morecambe, Lancashire, Lowestoft, Suffolk
- Status: Defunct
- Opened: 1994
- Closed: 1997
- Owner: Noel Edmonds
- Operated by: Unique
- Theme: Noel's House Party
- Slogan: Britain's first TV leisure park
- Operating season: Mid March-Late September (Cricket St. Thomas)

Crinkley Bottom at Cricket St Thomas
- Status: Defunct
- Opened: 1994
- Closed: 1996
- Replaced by: Cricket St Thomas Wildlife Park

Noel Edmonds' World of Crinkley Bottom
- Status: Defunct
- Opened: 1994
- Closed: 1994

Crinkley Bottom at Pleasurewood Hills
- Status: Defunct
- Opened: 1996
- Closed: 1997
- Replaced: Pleasurewood Hills
- Replaced by: Pleasurewood Hills

Crinkley Bottom, also popularly referred to as Blobbyland, was the operating title for a series of British theme parks operating in England in the 1990s. They were created by Noel Edmonds, based on the fictional village of Crinkley Bottom where the Noel's House Party television programme was based. The parks operated based on the popularity of Mr Blobby. Three parks were operated under the Crinkley Bottom name in England by Edmonds' company, Unique. However, all of the parks eventually failed and were either closed or rebranded.

== Background ==
Noel's House Party was a popular family entertainment programme on the BBC during the 1990s. The programme was hosted by Edmonds in the fictional village of Crinkley Bottom and included Mr Blobby as a comic relief character that gained fame during the decade. Hoping to capitalise on the popularity of both, Edmonds and his production company Unique looked into ways to open a theme park based around Noel's House Party. The first theme park opened in Cricket St Thomas, Somerset in 1994. It was promoted as "Britain's first TV leisure park".

== Cricket St Thomas ==
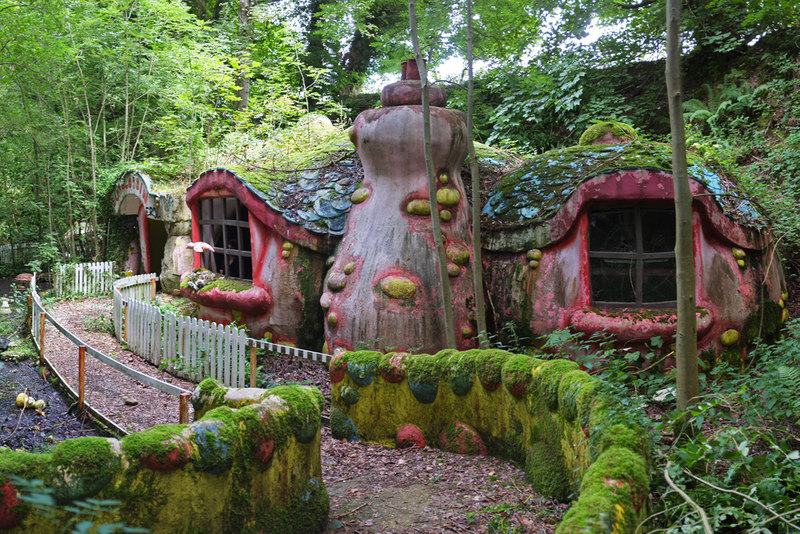
Abandoned remains of Dunblobbin', Crinkley Bottom, Cricket St Thomas, pictured in 2013

The first park, located in Cricket St Thomas in Somerset, was based around an existing wildlife park and the Cricket House country estate. The Crinkley Bottom park was based around Mr Blobby. A Blobby-themed house called "Dunblobbin'" was the main attraction, along with several other themed areas based on British children's television including Noddy and The Animals of Farthing Wood. The park opened in 1994 and was popular. In 1995, a water river ride based on children's television was opened with plans being made to open a replica of "The Great House" set from the television programme in Cricket House. In 1996, Edmonds pulled out of backing the park, though due to contractual rights the majority of the attractions remained. These were removed in 1997. References to Mr Blobby were removed, with Noddy being used as the main character for the rebranded Cricket St Thomas Wildlife Park until the whole area was closed in 1997. After rebranding, the Dunblobbin area was closed and sealed off.

In the 2000s, urban explorers rediscovered the abandoned Dunblobbin' house, which led to more people returning to Cricket St Thomas to see it. The owners of the land initially blocked off the site, eventually demolishing Dunblobbin' in 2014 due to vandalism, trespassing, and the holding of illegal raves. The polystyrene toilet was taken from the house in 2013 and placed in an art gallery.

== Morecambe ==
In 1994, Lancaster City Council agreed a deal with Edmonds to open a Crinkley Bottom on the grounds of Happy Mount Park in Morecambe, Lancashire. Councillors voted 59–1 in favour of a £300,000 investment. The park received outside sponsorship from Fuji and Mars, with British Rail giving the park free advertising by promoting the nearby Bare Lane railway station as "Bare Crinkley Bottom". It opened in July 1994 as "Noel Edmonds' World of Crinkley Bottom". Problems started to emerge shortly after opening. A month later, a liquor licence was granted to the park over complaints from Bare residents that it would lead to "hooligan" behaviour in the surrounding areas. Visitors started writing to the local paper to complain about a lack of facilities, with a 6,000-strong protest group formed to oppose it. In November, the Labour-led council voted to withdraw its support because the park was not meeting the promised visitor or income targets, thus closing the park after only thirteen weeks open to the public.

The council sued Edmonds and Unique for failing to reach the predicted targets on the grounds of misrepresentation and negligence. Unique countersued for the council unilaterally changing the contract so they kept all the gate receipts. The court found that the council had acted unlawfully during its handling of Crinkley Bottom and dismissed their claims while Edmonds was awarded £950,000 in damages. The fiasco gained the name of "Blobbygate". After a negative report into the council's handling of the situation, which had cost the local taxpayers £2.6 million, Edmonds stated that: "We wanted people investigated because they cheated the people of Morecambe out of something very significant. I thought Morecambe was famous for shrimps; now it's notorious for fudge." In 2016, the Countdown host Nick Hewer visited Morecambe to film a segment for BBC One's The One Show, detailing the park and resulting scandal.

== Lowestoft ==
In 1996 in Lowestoft, Suffolk, Unique licensed a Crinkley Bottom attraction at Pleasurewood Hills. During their Crinkley Bottom licence, the park transformed its theatre into a castle. This arrangement only lasted for a year due to a change of ownership.
