= Mr Blobby (song) =

1993 novelty song by Mr Blobby

Single by Mr Blobby

from the album Mr Blobby: The Album
- Released: 22 November 1993
- Recorded: 1993
- Genre: Pop; novelty
- Length: 3:34
- Label: Destiny Music Ltd/BMG
- Songwriters: David Rogers, Paul Shaw
- Producers: Paul Shaw; David Rogers

Mr Blobby singles chronology
"Mr Blobby" (1993)	"Christmas in Blobbyland" (1995)

"Mr Blobby" is a novelty song performed by character Mr Blobby, famous for appearing in the British Saturday night variety show Noel's House Party. It was written and produced by Paul Shaw and David Rogers, and was released on 22 November 1993. The song originally peaked at No. 1 on the UK singles chart on 11 December 1993 for one week but reclaimed the top spot to become the Christmas number one single, and spent a total of three weeks at No. 1. Despite its chart success, it has been panned by critics, some of whom have called it one of the worst songs ever recorded. Rogers and Shaw received an award at the Ivor Novello Awards 1994 for UK best-selling song in 1993 with "Mr Blobby".

== Chart performance ==
The single reached No. 1 on the UK singles chart on 11 December 1993, replacing Meat Loaf's "I'd Do Anything for Love (But I Won't Do That)", which had been in the No. 1 spot for seven weeks. A week later, "Babe" by Take That demoted Mr Blobby from the top spot for one week. Mr Blobby made a surprise return to the No. 1 spot on Christmas Day, and repeated that position the following week.

== Critical reception ==
In January 1994, Raul Cairo from Music & Media wrote, "In retrospect it is actually quite easy to understand why this poppified TV character shot to the top of the charts in no time in Great Britain and went to sell over 700.000 copies in just few weeks—because it's very basic and utterly irresistible." An MTV critic said that Blobby "tried to kill music... with what might be the worst song of all time"; the track is often named as such. Rupert Hawksley of The Telegraph ranked it as the worst Christmas number one in history, arguing that Blobby "set the bar so low with this bizarre single, it's hard to imagine that it could ever be usurped". Daily Record writer Euan McColm named it the third-worst Top 10 single of all time. It placed first in an HMV public poll of the worst-ever festive songs, and second in a VH1 viewer survey of the worst number one singles of all time. The track also came sixth in a Channel 4 poll of the 100 worst pop songs in history.

== Music video ==
A music video was created for the single and was filmed in the Kew Bridge Steam Museum. It spoofed several music videos such as "Addicted to Love" by Robert Palmer, "Stay" by Shakespears Sister, Snap!'s "Rhythm Is a Dancer", and "I Can't Dance" by Genesis.

The video featured Noel Edmonds, Carol Vorderman, Wayne Sleep, Garth Crooks. Jeremy Clarkson played Mr Blobby's limo driver.

It premiered on BBC1 during the episode of Noel’s House Party broadcast 2 days before the single's release.

== Track listing ==
1. "Mr Blobby"
2. "Mr Blobby's Theme"
3. "Mr Blobby" (Instrumental Mix)
4. "Mr Blobby "Blobby, Blobby, Blobby""

== Charts ==
=== Weekly charts ===
Chart (1993–1994)	Peak position
Australia (ARIA)	169
Europe (Eurochart Hot 100)	6
Ireland (IRMA)	8
UK Singles (OCC)	1
UK Airplay (ERA)	68

=== Year-end charts ===
Chart (1993)	Position
UK Singles (OCC)	6

Chart (1994)	Position
UK Singles (OCC)	171

== Certifications ==
Region	Certification	Certified units/sales
United Kingdom (BPI)	Platinum	600,000^{^}
^{^} Shipments figures based on certification alone.
