= Edesix =

- Founded: Edinburgh, Scotland
- Founders: Richie McBride and Robin Iddon
- Headquarters: Edinburgh, Scotland, United Kingdom
- Products: VideoBadge, VideoManager
- Website: www.edesix.com

Edesix Ltd is a manufacturer of body worn video and digital evidence solutions based in Edinburgh, Scotland. The company designs, develops and manufacturers all its hardware and software.

Edesix was founded in Edinburgh in 2002 by Richie McBride and Robin Iddon. Previously McBride and Iddon worked together at Spider Systems, which was acquired by Shiva Corporation in 1995, before they became the founders of Axon Networks. In 1996, Axon Networks was acquired by 3Com for $65 million. In June 2017, At IFSEC 2017, Edesix launched videoTag body-worn camera series.

Edesix was acquired by Vigilant Solutions in October 2018 and is now part of Motorola Solutions after Vigilant Solutions was acquired by Motorola Solutions in January 2019.
