= The Windwhistle Inn =

18th century pub in Somerset, England

Coordinates: 50°52′58″N 2°52′53″W

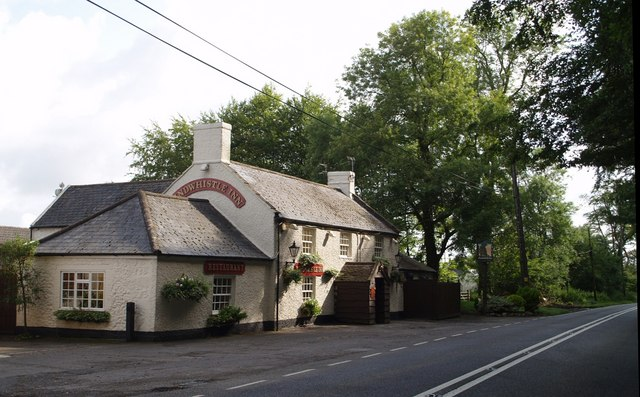
The Windwhistle Inn in 2007.

The Windwhistle Inn, now known as the Cricket St Thomas Country Inn, is a historic pub of 17th century origin at Cricket St Thomas, Somerset, England. It is located on the A30 road between Crewkerne and Chard.

== History ==
The Windwhistle Inn dates back to the 17th century. It contains a traditional bar in the original building, with later extensions providing a separate restaurant area, a large conservatory and a function room for weddings and other large parties.

The inn got its name due to its location on a ridge (once known as Rana Hill), where it is fully exposed to "rushing winds". It remains the only public house in England to bear this name, except for a public house in existence on the Bournville Estate at Weston-super-Mare between 1954 and 1998.

The inn was reputedly a favourite establishment of local highwaymen and a nearby well was claimed to have been "where the bodies of the victims were thrown". Another local folklore tale claims that victims were lured or dragged down into the inn's cellar and their throats slit.

During World War II, the local Home Guard used the inn as their unofficial headquarters and regularly undertook drill practice there. It was also frequented by various military personnel over the course of the war as the nearby manor house at Cricket St Thomas and its estate was requisitioned, initially for the Royal Warwickshire Regiment, then Polish and Czechoslovak personnel, and later those of the United States Army.

The inn was purchased by St Austell Brewery in 2014. It suddenly closed its doors in November 2024 after the current tenant stepped down from operating it. The brewery announced their intention to find a new tenant who could reopen the pub "as soon as possible". After refurbishment, it reopened under new tenants on 19 December 2025, but closed again in April 2026 after St Austell Brewery sold the pub to Cricket St Thomas Golf Club. The club refurbished and then reopened the pub on 1 July 2026 under the name Cricket St Thomas Country Inn.

== In literature ==
English poet Thomas Hardy referenced the Windwhistle Inn in his 1902 poem "A Trampwoman's Tragedy". In Hardy's notes, he recalled a visit two or three years prior to writing the poem, where on requesting tea, he was told by the landlady that he would have to fetch the water from half a mile away, as the inn only had beer available.

== Gallery ==
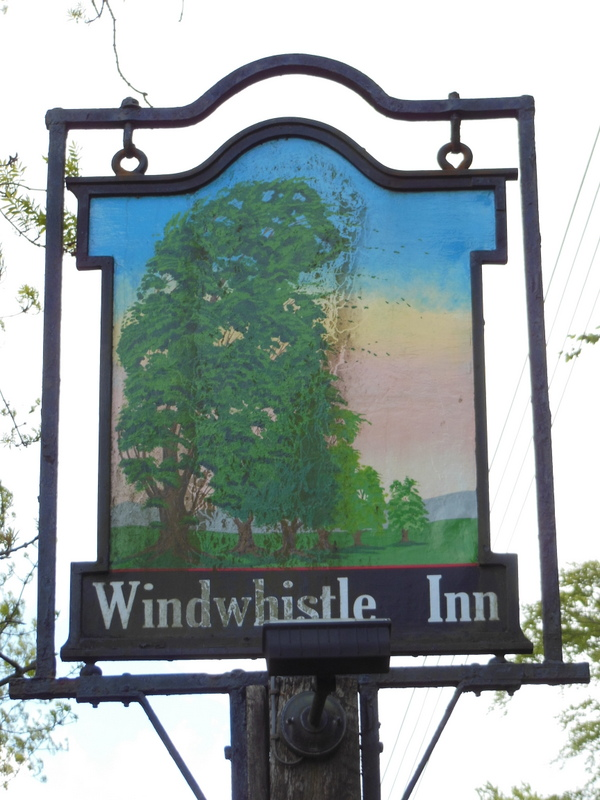
Pub sign in 2013

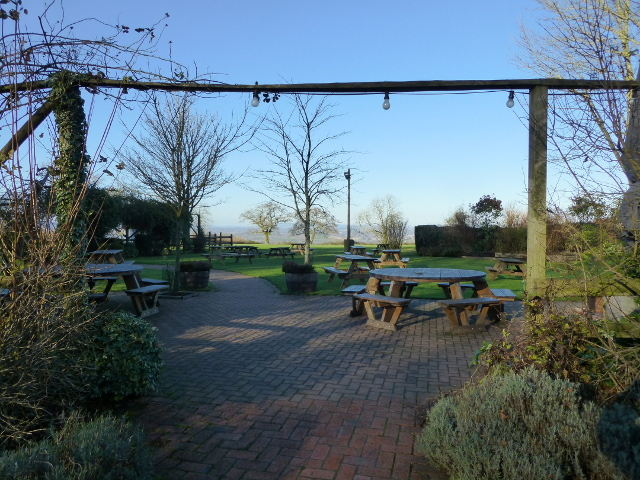
Beer garden in 2012

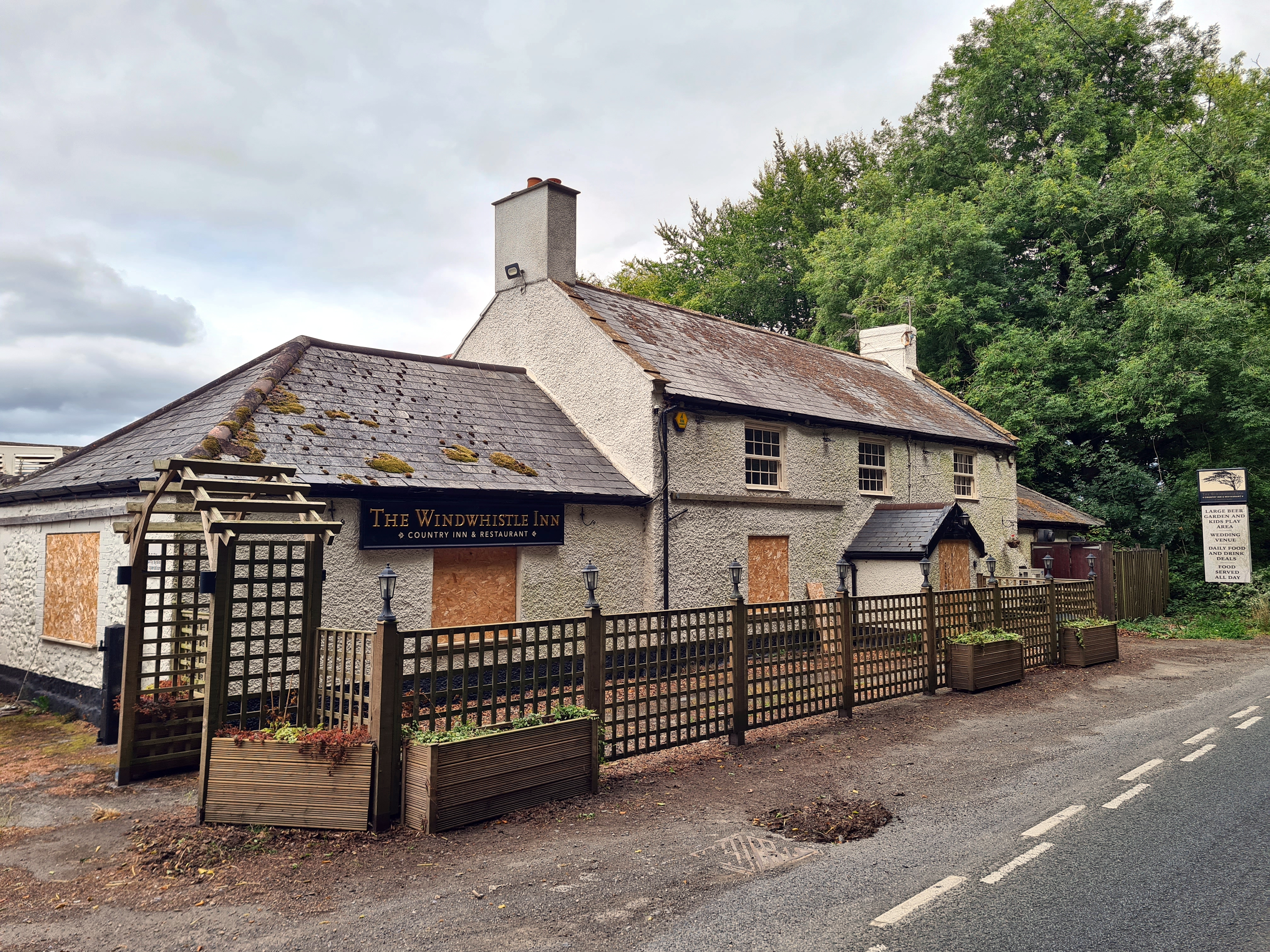
The closed Windwhistle Inn in 2025

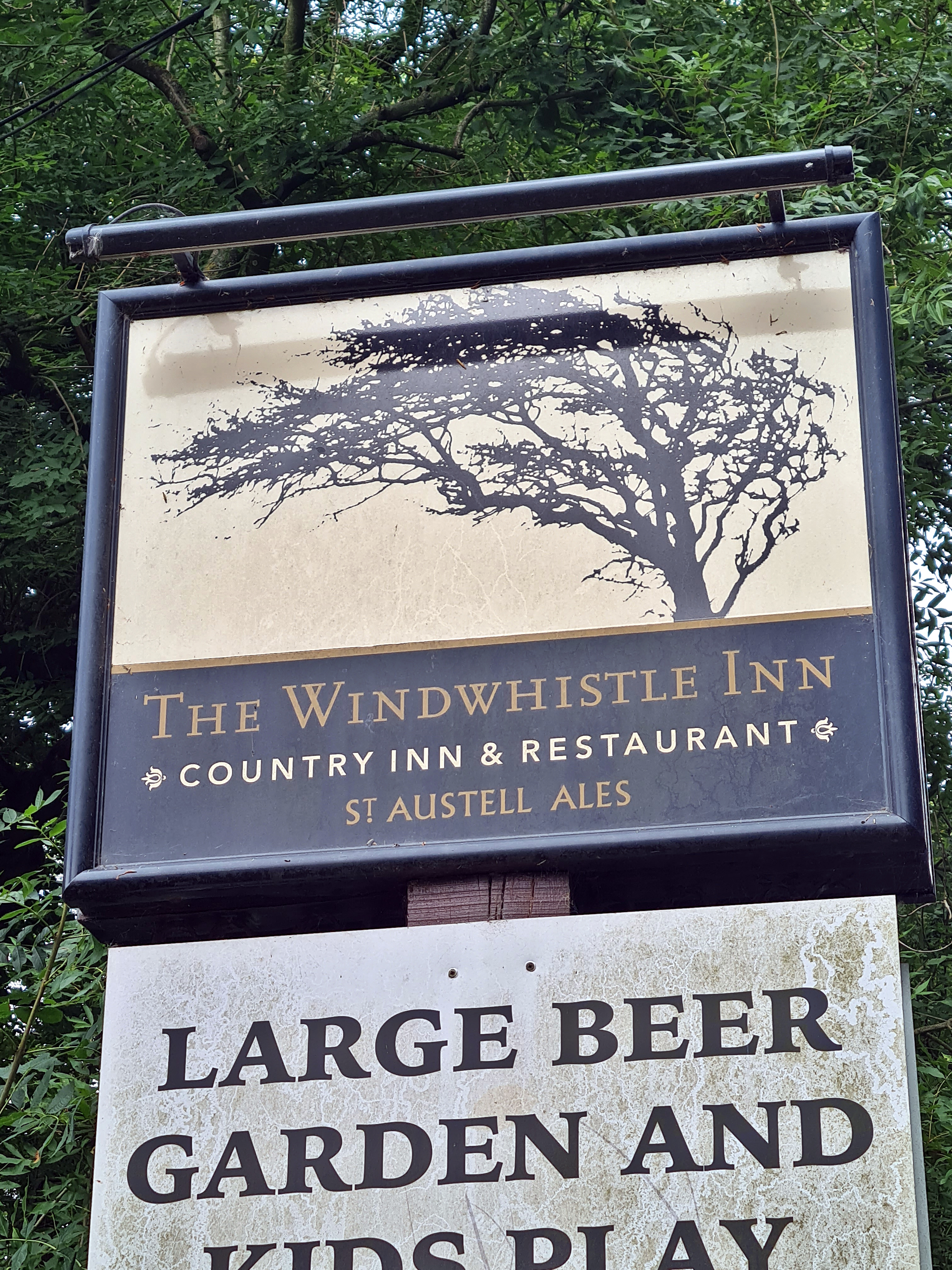
Pub sign in 2025

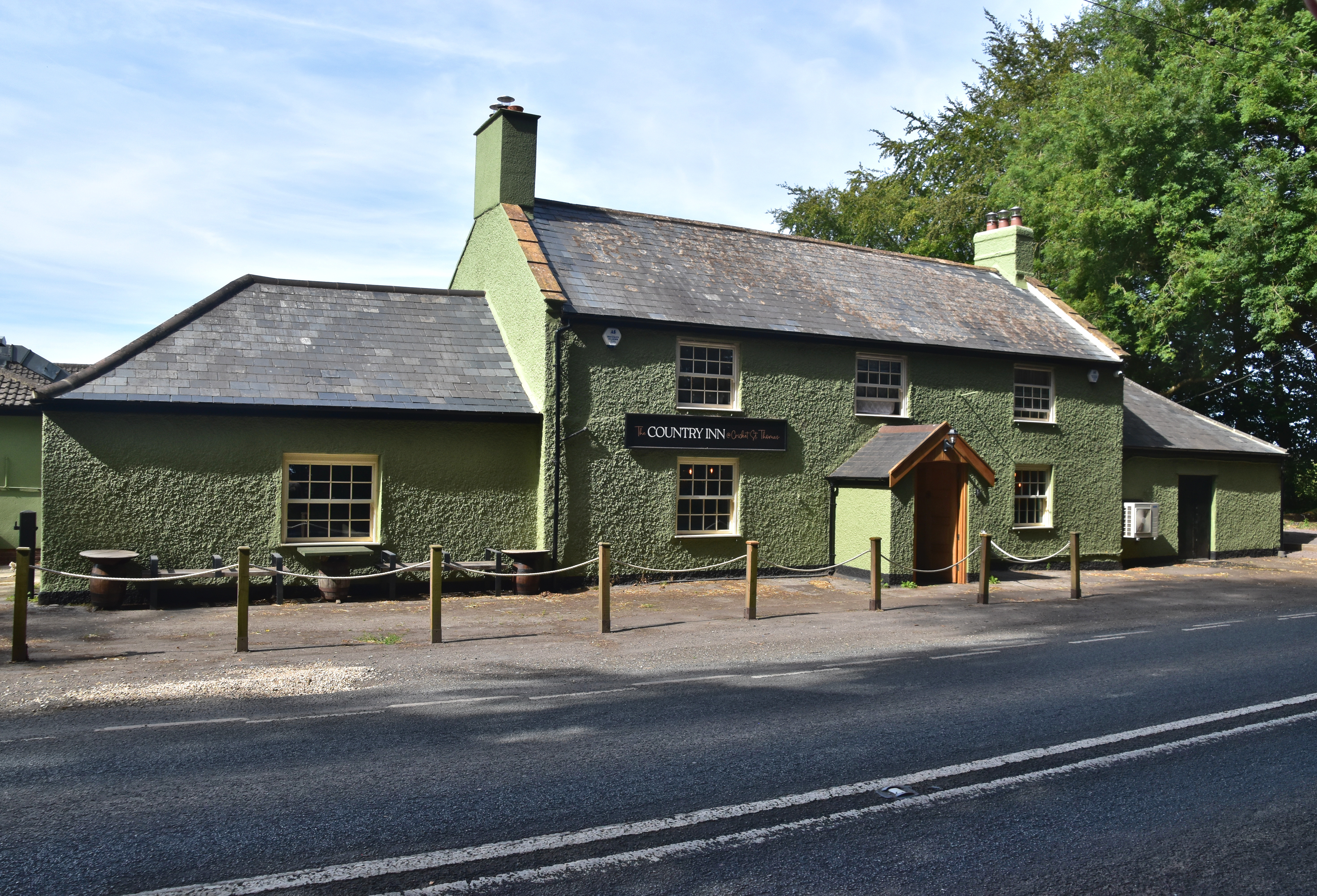
Cricket St Thomas Country Inn, formerly the Windwhistle Inn, in 2026
