= Cricket St Thomas =

Civil parish in Somerset, England

Coordinates: 50.872°N 2.895°W

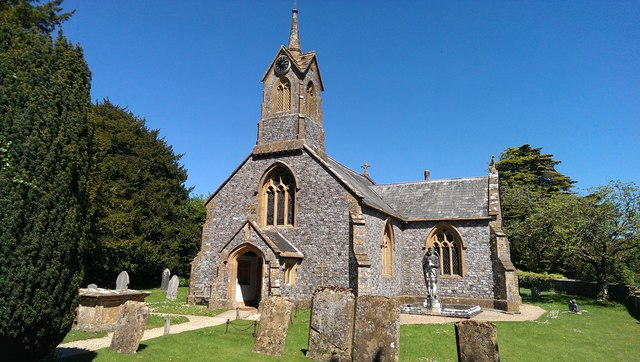
- Church of St Thomas, Cricket St Thomas

- Location within Somerset
- Population: 50 (2011)
- OS grid reference: ST375084
- Civil parish: Cricket St Thomas
- Unitary authority: Somerset
- Ceremonial county: Somerset
- Region: South West
- Country: England
- Sovereign state: United Kingdom
- Post town: CHARD
- Postcode district: TA20
- Dialling code: 01460
- Police: Avon and Somerset
- Fire: Devon and Somerset
- Ambulance: South Western
- UK Parliament: Yeovil

Cricket St Thomas is a parish in Somerset, England, situated in a valley between Chard and Crewkerne and was formerly within the South Somerset administrative district. The A30 road passes nearby. The parish has a population of 50. It is noted for the historic manor house known as Cricket House, and its estate in recent times formerly home to a wildlife park.

== Toponymy ==
The name Cricket St Thomas is derived from the Anglo-Saxon word "cruc", meaning a hill or ridge. The nearby 17th century Windwhistle Inn was named after its exposure to the "rushing winds" on the ridge.

== Descent of the manor ==
The manor is listed in the Domesday Book of 1086, where it is described as "Land of the Count of Martin" paying tax to the king for six hides, or about 720 acres (291.4 ha). It had two slaves, six villagers, five smallholders and a variety of livestock and was valued for tax purposes at 100 shillings. It was at that time within the Hundred of South Petherton.

In the 11th century the manor was held by the de Cricket family. In 1328-9 Michael de Cricket sold the manor to Walter de Rodney, who subsequently conveyed it to John of Clevedon. In 1466 it was acquired by Stephen Preston, whose great-grandson and last male descendant was John Preston, whose daughter and heiress Margaret Preston (d.1672), married John Hippisley of Ston Easton in Somerset, and thus Cricket St Thomas passed to her Hippisley descendants. In 1775 Richard Hippisley-Coxe sold it to Admiral Alexander Hood, 1st Viscount Bridport, 1st Baron Bridport (1726–1814), who although having married twice died childless and thus bequeathed it to his younger great-nephew Samuel Hood, 2nd Baron Bridport (1788–1868) (who inherited his Irish barony by special remainder), the husband of Charlotte Mary Nelson, 3rd Duchess of Bronté (1787–1873), daughter and heiress of William Nelson, 1st Earl Nelson, 2nd Duke of Bronté (1757–1835), elder brother and heir of the great Admiral Horatio Nelson, 1st Viscount Nelson, 1st Duke of Bronté (1758–1805). Samuel and Charlotte's son Alexander Hood, 1st Viscount Bridport, 3rd Baron Bridport (1814–1904) (Viscountcy created 1868), 4th Duke of Bronté in Sicily, sold it in 1898 to the chocolate manufacturer Francis Fry (d.1918), the estate having become heavily mortgaged.

== Modern governance ==
Today the parish council has responsibility for local issues, including setting an annual precept (local rate) to cover the council's operating costs and producing annual accounts for public scrutiny. The parish council evaluates local planning applications and works with the local police, district council officers, and neighbourhood watch groups on matters of crime, security, and traffic. The parish council's role also includes initiating projects for the maintenance and repair of parish facilities, as well as consulting with the district council on the maintenance, repair, and improvement of highways, drainage, footpaths, public transport, and street cleaning. Conservation matters (including trees and listed buildings) and environmental issues are also the responsibility of the council.

The parish was within the Non-metropolitan district of South Somerset, which was formed on 1 April 1974 under the Local Government Act 1972, having previously been part of Chard Rural District. The district council was abolished on 31 March 2023.

Somerset Council is now the unitary authority responsible for the area.

It is also part of the Yeovil county constituency represented in the House of Commons of the Parliament of the United Kingdom. It elects one Member of Parliament (MP) by the first past the post system of election. It was part of the South West England constituency of the European Parliament prior to Britain leaving the European Union in January 2020, which elected seven MEPs using the d'Hondt method of party-list proportional representation.

== Church of St Thomas ==
The parish Church of St Thomas, a Grade II* listed building, was almost totally rebuilt in 1819–20 by Samuel Hood, 2nd Baron Bridport, and traces of the earlier ancient Saxon and medieval building have largely been lost. The church contains monuments to the Nelson family (Earl Nelson) and its successor the Hood family (Viscount Bridport), lords of the manor, seated at Cricket House from the 18th century until 1898.

=== Monuments ===
Monuments in the church and churchyard include those to:

- Admiral Alexander Hood, 1st Viscount Bridport (1726–1814) (title created 1800), on the chancel south wall, who first acquired the estate. Designed by Sir John Soane and bearing his signature, it comprises a black marble base topped by white marble Ionic columns framing an inscribed tablet.

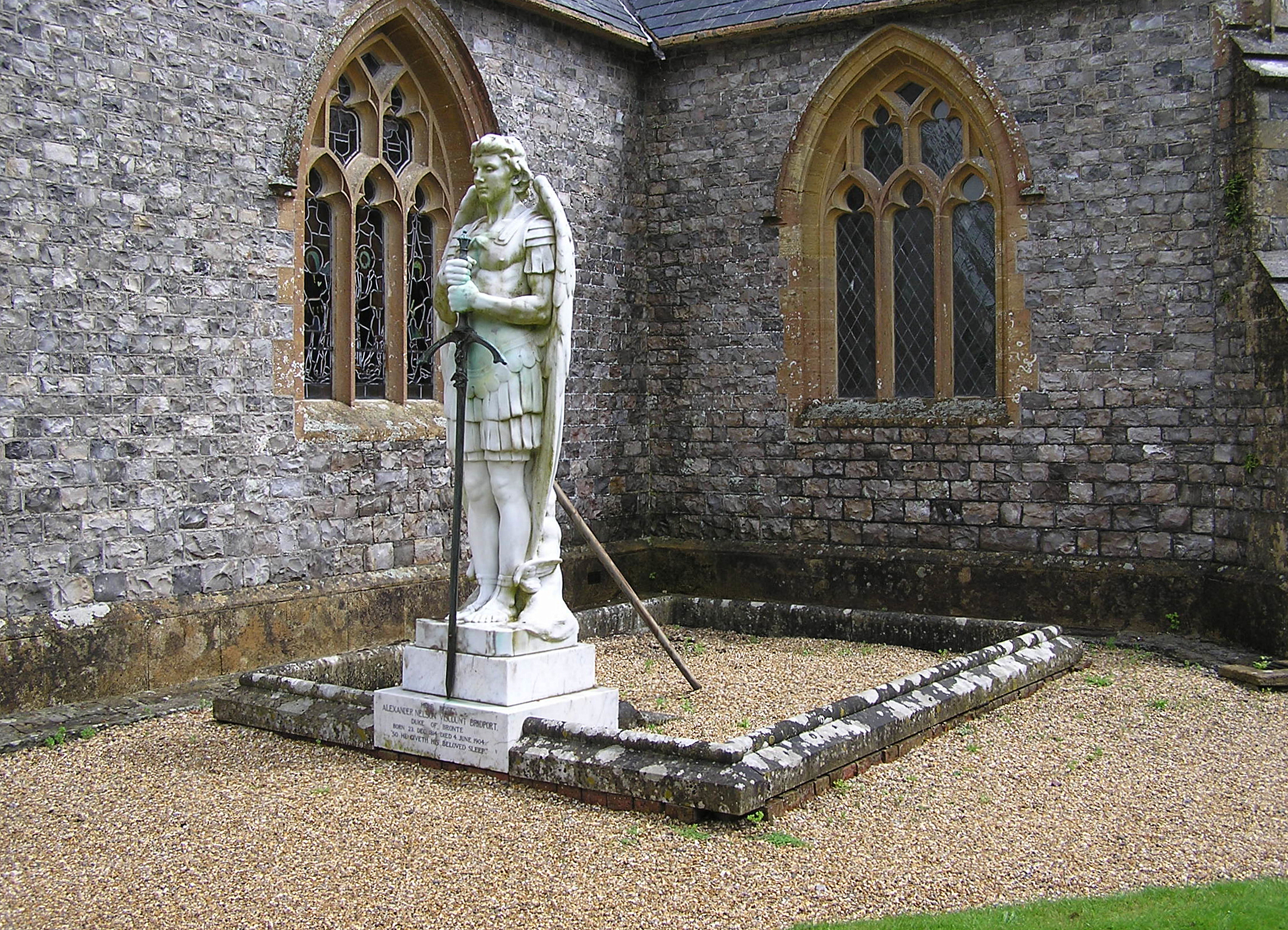
Monument to Alexander Hood, 1st Viscount Bridport (1814–1904), Cricket St Thomas Church

- Alexander Hood, 1st Viscount Bridport (1814–1904) (title created 1868), 4th Duke of Bronté in Sicily, the Admiral 1st Viscount's great-great nephew. Situated in the churchyard next to the church it consists of a white marble lifesize standing figure of St Michael the Archangel. A note in the church states that for many years the statue was laid flat, as the white figure at night scared too many locals.
- John Northcote (d.1738), commemorated in the churchyard by one of two 18th-century chest tombs made from hamstone.

Mounted on the north nave wall is a fragment of the altar cloth used in the Coronation Service of Queen Elizabeth II in 1952.

== Cricket House ==
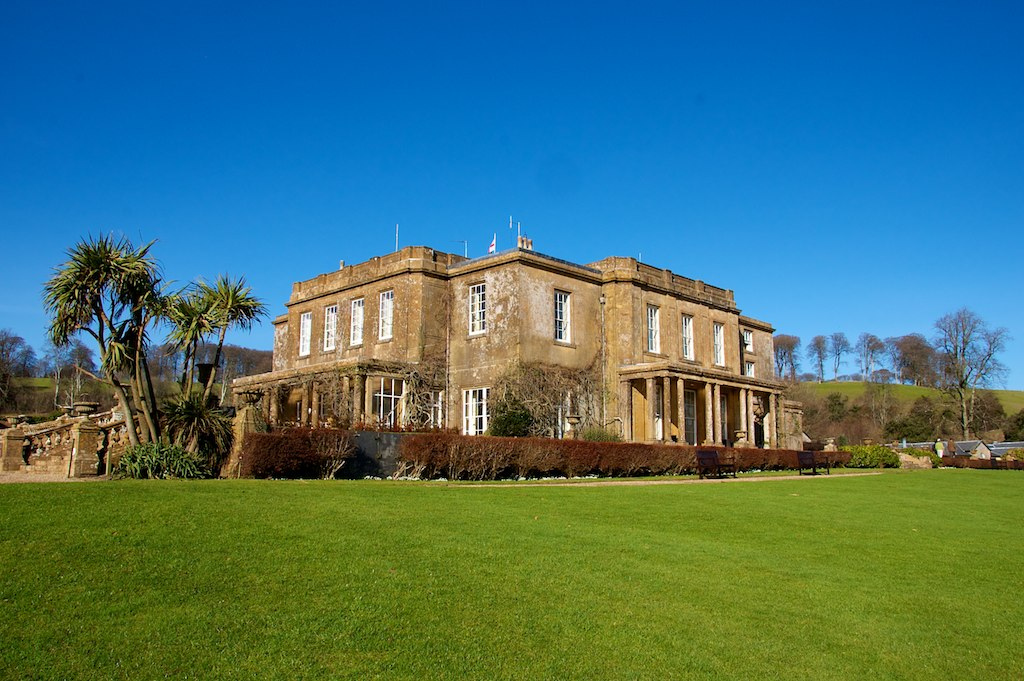
Cricket House

The surviving grade II listed Georgian manor house, known as "Cricket House", was built in 1786 by Admiral Alexander Hood, 1st Viscount Bridport (1726–1814), to the designs of the architect Sir John Soane (1753–1837). The Admiral had purchased the estate in 1775 from Richard Hippisley Coxe. It is unknown whether the new house incorporated elements of the earlier 14th century house or whether it was completely new. Soane completed further alterations in 1801–7. The Georgian orangery attached to the house was later turned into a parrot house but is now used for bowling by Warner holiday guests. In the grounds is a small garden house known as "The Admirals Seat". During World War Two the house and estate were requisitioned by the army. Originally housing the Warwickshire Regiment, it was later used by the Poles, the Czechs and the US Army. The local Home Guard, the 3rd Somerset Battalion, also operated from the site.

In 1999 the house was developed into a Warner Leisure Hotels resort.

=== Fictionalised as "Grantleigh Manor" ===
Cricket House was filmed as the fictitious "Grantleigh Manor" in the British sitcom television series To the Manor Born, broadcast from 1979 to 1981 and written by Peter Spence, whose father-in-law was then the owner of the house. Despite the closeness depicted on screen, the Manor and Lodge are in fact about one mile (1.6 km) apart. The Lodge was given additional features such as gateposts to give the impression it was a gatehouse, following various previous alterations. The house was again used as "Grantleigh Manor" in a 25th anniversary special of To The Manor Born shown in 2007.

=== Heritage at Risk Register ===
In 2009 the estate was added to English Heritage's Heritage at Risk Register due to pressure from the development of the hotel and leisure facilities. Its vulnerability is now classed as 'Medium', with its condition classed as 'Generally satisfactory but with significant localised problems'. Some parts of the grounds have been restored through Natural England's Environmental Stewardship Scheme.

=== Wildlife park ===
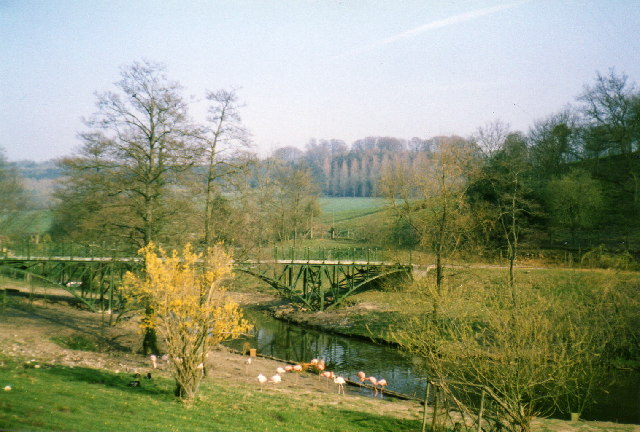
Wildlife Park at Cricket St Thomas

The former deer park of the house, known as "Cricket Park", was designed by D.D. (David) Davis, a noted horticulturist at the start of the 19th Century, and was later turned into a wildlife park. The wildlife park was home to 600 rare and endangered species including lemurs, primates, camels, reptiles and wildfowl. Questions were raised in the UK parliament in 1995 after a rare Asian elephant was euthanised at the park. The wildlife park closed in 2009 and most of the larger animals were moved to other zoos around the country. Some of the smaller animals, such as the lemurs, were kept and the park was returned to gardens and lakes, re-opening in mid-2010. The park has since closed again and little remains of the enclosures or buildings.

=== Crinkley Bottom theme park ===
In 1994 the grounds also became home to Crinkley Bottom, a theme park created by the broadcaster Noel Edmonds themed on the "Mr Blobby" character from his hit BBC television series Noel's House Party. The project was short-lived and closed within four years, shortly after Noel's House Party went off air, when the grounds reverted to their previous use.

Mr Blobby's house, named 'Dunblobbin' was situated at the rear of the park. Other attractions at the park included a TV-themed dark ride and a walkthrough exhibit of Noddy's Toyland Adventures. Remains of the house and its 'Blobbyland' theme park could still be seen until 2014, overgrown and strewn with fallen leaves and mud. Mr Blobby's house was demolished in late 2014.
