= Mr Blobby =

Character

- Mr Blobby in 1993
- First appearance: 24 October 1992; Noel's House Party
- Created by: Michael Leggo
- Portrayed by: Noel Edmonds (1992); Barry Killerby (1992–2015); Paul Denson (2016–present)

In-universe information
- Gender: Male
- Spouse: Mrs Blobby
- Children: Baby Blobby (son)
- Nationality: British

Mr Blobby is a character originally featured on the British Saturday night variety show Noel's House Party, broadcast on BBC One. Created by Charlie Adams, a writer for the show, Mr Blobby is a bulbous pink figure covered in yellow spots, with a permanent toothy grin and green jiggling eyes. Mr Blobby communicates only by saying the word "blobby" in an electronically altered voice, expressing his moods through tone of voice and repetition. He topped the UK Singles Chart with the 1993 Christmas release "Mr Blobby".

== History ==
=== Origins ===
Mr Blobby first appeared in 1992 in the 'Gotcha' segment of the second series of Noel's House Party, in which celebrities were caught out in a Candid Camera style prank. Mr Blobby was presented to the celebrities as if he were a real and established children's television character, in order to record a feature about the guests' professions, with the character of Mr Blobby ostensibly portrayed by Barry Killerby in a costume created by artist Joshua Snow. In reality, the setup was completely fictitious; while camera rehearsals would take place with a partly-costumed Killerby, Noel Edmonds would secretly don the full costume for the supposed recording session, and would focus on acting childishly and unprofessionally to irritate the celebrities taking part, before Edmonds revealed the prank by unmasking himself in front of the celebrity. After the conclusion of the second series, the character was made a regular feature of the programme, with Killerby now playing him full-time.

Through Noel's House Party, Mr Blobby was seen in short comedy sketches, 'guest-appearing' on other TV programmes. Examples include Lovejoy, where he unintentionally broke antique furniture, and Keeping Up Appearances, where he was seen paying an impromptu visit to Hyacinth and Richard Bucket, disrupting their kitchen. Mr Blobby was dropped from Noel's House Party for its final series, but was brought back for the programme's final episode.

=== Other appearances ===
Mr Blobby made regular appearances on the Saturday morning show Live & Kicking and the Saturday evening show The Generation Game with Jim Davidson. The character has appeared in cameos on Dead Ringers, Harry Hill's TV Burp, Dick and Dom in da Bungalow and Ant & Dec's Saturday Night Takeaway. The character also appeared in the music video for Peter Kay's 2005 charity single "Is This the Way to Amarillo".

In December 1997, Mr Blobby made a guest appearance on the children's game show Get Your Own Back where he was the losing grown-up and was subsequently gunged. He made a return the following year (playing a judge on the show this time) and gunged presenter Dave Benson Phillips as revenge for the previous year.

In 2012, Mr Blobby made a guest appearance on the 23 September episode of The Big Fat Quiz of the Year "The Big Fat Quiz of the '90s".

In May 2017, Mr Blobby made a guest appearance in the "Ghostbusters" episode of The Keith & Paddy Picture Show, where he was portrayed by Paul Denson. He also appeared on The Last Leg, where he was declared as leader of "The 90s Party", a political party formed by the show's hosts.

In November 2018, during Noel Edmonds' appearance on the eighteenth series of I'm a Celebrity...Get Me Out of Here!, Mr Blobby made guest appearances on Loose Women and This Morning and was interviewed about Edmonds' time on the show. On 6 September 2019, Mr Blobby appeared on the 20th Anniversary episode of Loose Women where he grappled Carol McGiffin, losing an eye in the process.

In January and February 2019, Mr Blobby appeared in an advertising campaign celebrating the 100th birthday of supermarket Tesco. In November 2019, Mr Blobby appeared in Virgin Trains West Coast's "Final Whistle" music video, celebrating the end of the franchise.

On 7 November 2021, Mr Blobby took part in the Children in Need's Puppet Aid musical, but was locked out of the studio while the rest of Britain's famous puppets sang Starship's "Nothing's Gonna Stop Us Now". He then (according to the video) broke into the studio three hours later and delivered the final note. In September 2022, Mr Blobby appeared on The Big Breakfast and rode a mechanical bull. In November 2022, Mr Blobby appeared in a celebrity call centre mockumentary segment for Children in Need 2022.

Mr Blobby has toured around the UK making public appearances at events such as university balls and in pantomime, and has made short videos and sketches exclusively for his official YouTube channel. From 4 December 2021, Mr Blobby starred in The Chrysalis Theatre, Milton Keynes' pantomime version of Peter Pan. The production ended prematurely due to the COVID-19 pandemic. He also appeared on BBC News and was interviewed by Christian Fraser to discuss his pantomime appearance.

In January 2023, Mr Blobby appeared on This Morning again, this time during a segment with Alice Beer as part of a discussion about the unused original Mr Blobby costume that had been listed on eBay. The costume later fetched a bid of £62,101, however the buyer later backed out of the sale. In May 2023, Mr Blobby auditioned for the sixteenth series of Britain’s Got Talent where he performed a magic act, failing to make Simon Cowell disappear, gunging him, and pressing the red buzzer on himself. On 17 June 2024, Mr Blobby appeared on Good Morning Britain with Noel Edmonds. In April 2026, Mr. Blobby appeared on The Claudia Winkleman Show to ask the guests a question. Comedian Josh Widdicombe had explained the concept of Mr. Blobby to fellow guest Dan Levy earlier in the episode; Levy described the character as "bone-chilling" and expressed terror when he saw Mr. Blobby in-person, particularly after hearing him speak. The finale of Saturday Night Live UK's first series depicted Blobby as a murderous subterranean entity responsible for the closure of Britain's coalmines.

== Critical reception ==
In March 1994, Elizabeth Kolbert of The New York Times wrote: "Mr Blobby's rise to stardom has provoked anguished commentaries about just what he stands for... Some commentators have called him a metaphor for a nation gone soft in the head. Others have seen him as proof of Britain's deep-seated attraction to trash." A Sun article published the previous month had reported that Blobby reduced a young girl to tears after throwing her birthday cake onto the floor during a show in Luton, causing the girl's father to mount the stage and assault Blobby. Neville Crumpton, who bought some of the merchandise rights to the character in 1993, said: "If the press can knock him, they'll knock him whenever they can."

Blobby has been criticised by BBC personalities: Michael Parkinson found the character to be "far from amusing", while Bob Mortimer called him a "pink, spotty, rubber twat". In February 2009, Cole Moreton of The Independent featured Blobby in a recounting of the "10 most irritating television characters", asking: "Was there something in the water? Did the nation really once fall about laughing at the clumsy antics of a bloke in a big pink rubber costume with yellow blobs all over it?"

In a 2016 article, Stuart Heritage of The Guardian wrote that Blobby had become "a sensation immediately", but then devolved into a "widely despised irritant". In 2026, cultural historian Matthew Sweet described Blobby's design as being "unimaginative to the point of atavism" where the character's "dumb relentlessness has allowed him to push through into some other territory". Comedy writer Joel Morris observed that the character's unusual origin in a non-existent children's show meant that "there’s nowhere he doesn't fit", and the fact that Blobby would always be inherently out of place in any appearance made for "powerful comedy".

== Music career ==
Mr Blobby's 1993 Christmas release "Mr Blobby", which topped the UK Singles Chart for three weeks, is regarded by many as the worst single, and indeed, song, of all time. It beat Meat Loaf's "I'd Do Anything for Love (But I Won't Do That)," and Take That's "Babe", among other songs to Christmas number 1. His 1995 track "Christmas in Blobbyland" (a number 36 UK entry) was voted the worst Christmas song ever by British Christmas shoppers in 2011 and 2015 polls, and was named in a 2013 Metro article as the second-worst Christmas song of all time, being beaten by Destiny's Child's "A DC Christmas Medley". Mr Blobby: The Album (1994) was voted the worst LP ever made in a 2016 listener survey.

== Toys and merchandising ==
VHS covers of the three Mr Blobby releases.

Around Christmas 1993, retailers came out with many types of Mr Blobby merchandise. In addition to the CD, 7" vinyl or cassette tape single, Blobby merchandise included dolls and plush toys, slippers, egg cups, condiment shakers, pink lemonade, and towels.

Three programs were released on VHS: Mr Blobby (1993), Blobbyvision (1994) and The All New Adventures of Mr Blobby (1996).

=== UK VHS releases ===
No.	Title	Catalogue no.	Release Date
1	"Mr Blobby"	BBCV 5157	1 November 1993
2	"Blobbyvision"	BBCV 5397	10 October 1994
3	"The All New Adventures of Mr Blobby"	BBCV 5786	5 February 1996

=== Video game ===
In 1994, Millennium Interactive released Mr Blobby, a platform game based on the character for Amiga and MS-DOS. It was a reskinned version of the SNES game Super Troll Islands, also developed by Millennium. The game received negative reviews from critics.

== Theme parks ==
Mr Blobby appeared at three Crinkley Bottom-themed attractions in pre-existing British theme parks during the 1990s. The first was based at Cricket St Thomas in Somerset, opening in July 1994. Attractions included a walk-through Blobby House named Dunblobbin, a dark ride based around classic children's television characters, and an animated Noddy exhibit. While the park attracted over 500,000 visitors in its first year, attendance figures dwindled and the park closed in 1998.

The second park was opened at Happy Mount Park, Morecambe, in 1994. This led to large losses, a local scandal toppling councillors and finally an auditor's investigation, which reported in 2004 that "the Council's decision to proceed with the Theme Park was, on the basis of information available to Members and officers in March 1994, imprudent and failed to give due regard to the interests of local taxpayers." The auditor noted "the failure of the Council to carry out market research, the failure to make informed estimates of likely attendance figures, the absence of a design concept, the absence of a detailed specification, the absence of an accurate financial forecast and the imprecise drafting of the Heads of Terms", concluding that "the Council entered into an open-ended commitment without knowing what it was going to get for local taxpayers' money." Council losses stood at £2.5 million. Unique successfully sued the council, whose activities were described as "imprudent, irrational and even unlawful", for £950,000.

A third park based in Pleasurewood Hills, Lowestoft also failed to outlive the 1990s but maintained successful revenue during and after the Crinkley Bottom branding.

== Actors ==
=== Barry Killerby ===
The original man in the Blobby suit, Barry Killerby, is a classically trained Shakespearean actor from Bradford, West Yorkshire. In 2008, he was working as a compère for an entertainment company. He commented that working as Mr Blobby was harder than it looks, saying "People think it's easy bouncing around saying, 'blobby', but they should try it. It was exhausting and demanding." Killerby's final appearance as Blobby was on The Big Fat Quiz of the Year in December 2012.

=== Mickey Wills ===
Trained by Barry Killerby, Mickey Wills was the head of entertainment and key actor of Mr Blobby at Cricket St Thomas' Crinkley Bottom, often performing up to seven shows a day.

=== Paul Denson ===
Following Killerby's retirement from the role, Paul Denson was asked if he would run the Mr Blobby YouTube channel and occasionally wear the suit to make video content. Denson, a child of the 1990s, said he "thought it sounded like fun" and that it "was surreal putting on the suit for the first time." His first credited appearance as Blobby was on Alan Carr: Chatty Man in December 2016 and he has appeared as the character ever since.
