= The Designer Rooms =

Scottish homeware store

- Decor To Inspire You

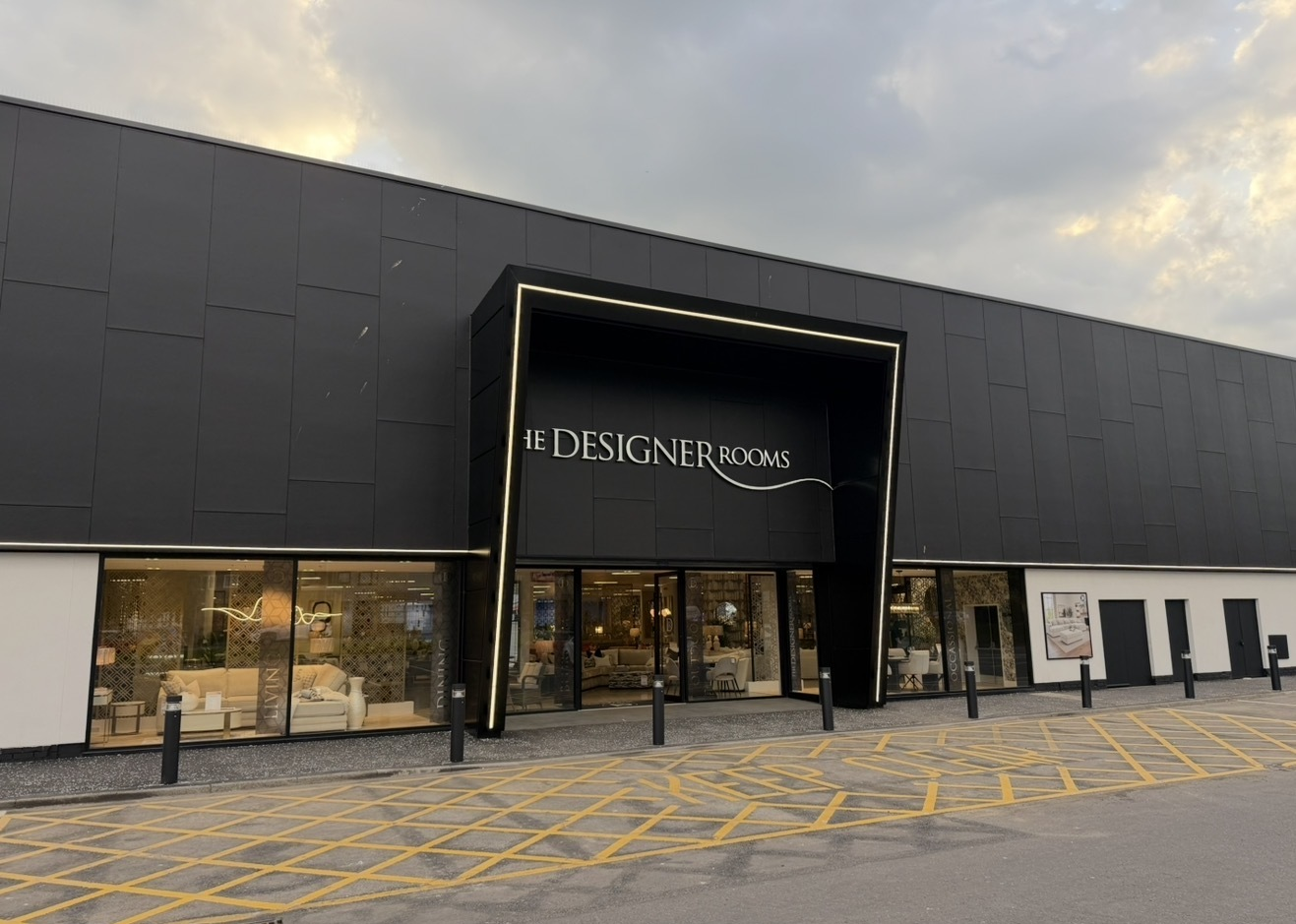
- The Designer Rooms flagship store in Kilmarnock
- Type: Furniture and interior company
- Industry: Furnishings, fragrance, home decor
- Founded: 2010
- Headquarters: Ayr, Scotland
- Key people: Ryan Campbell (CEO)
- Products: Campbell & Co; Sensum Scents
- Net income: £17 million (2021)
- Owner: Ryan Campbell
- Number of employees: 70 (2020)
- Website: thedesignerrooms.com

The Designer Rooms is a Scottish high–quality furniture store, specialising in designer and contemporary furnishings and home accessories which was established in 2010 by Ryan Campbell in Ayr, South Ayrshire on the west coast of Scotland. The company opened their first showroom in Ayr, before opening further showrooms across the Ayrshire region in locations including Irvine and Kilmarnock, and subsequently opened showrooms across Scotland, including Wishaw and Glasgow.

In addition to furnishings, The Designer Rooms manufactures its own home fragrance, Sensum Scents, as well as homeware accessories under the Campbell & Co name. Each showroom across the company features a "signature scent" known as Persian Spice which is manufactured by Sensum Scents. In 2021, it had an operational net income of £17 million.

== History ==
=== Establishment ===
The company was founded by the Campbell family – Caitlin, Siobhan, Ryan and Carly – as a family business, and opened their first showroom in the costal town of Ayr, the largest settlement in the South Ayrshire area of Scotland. Since opening in 2010, the company had opened a further six showrooms across Scotland, with a showroom located within the Silverburn Shopping Centre in Glasgow opening in 2019. The Silverburn showroom closed at the end of December 2025 following an end of the lease agreement with the landlord. In 2019, it was estimated that The Designer Rooms was on course to turn over a profit in excess of $10 million (USD).

=== Expansion ===
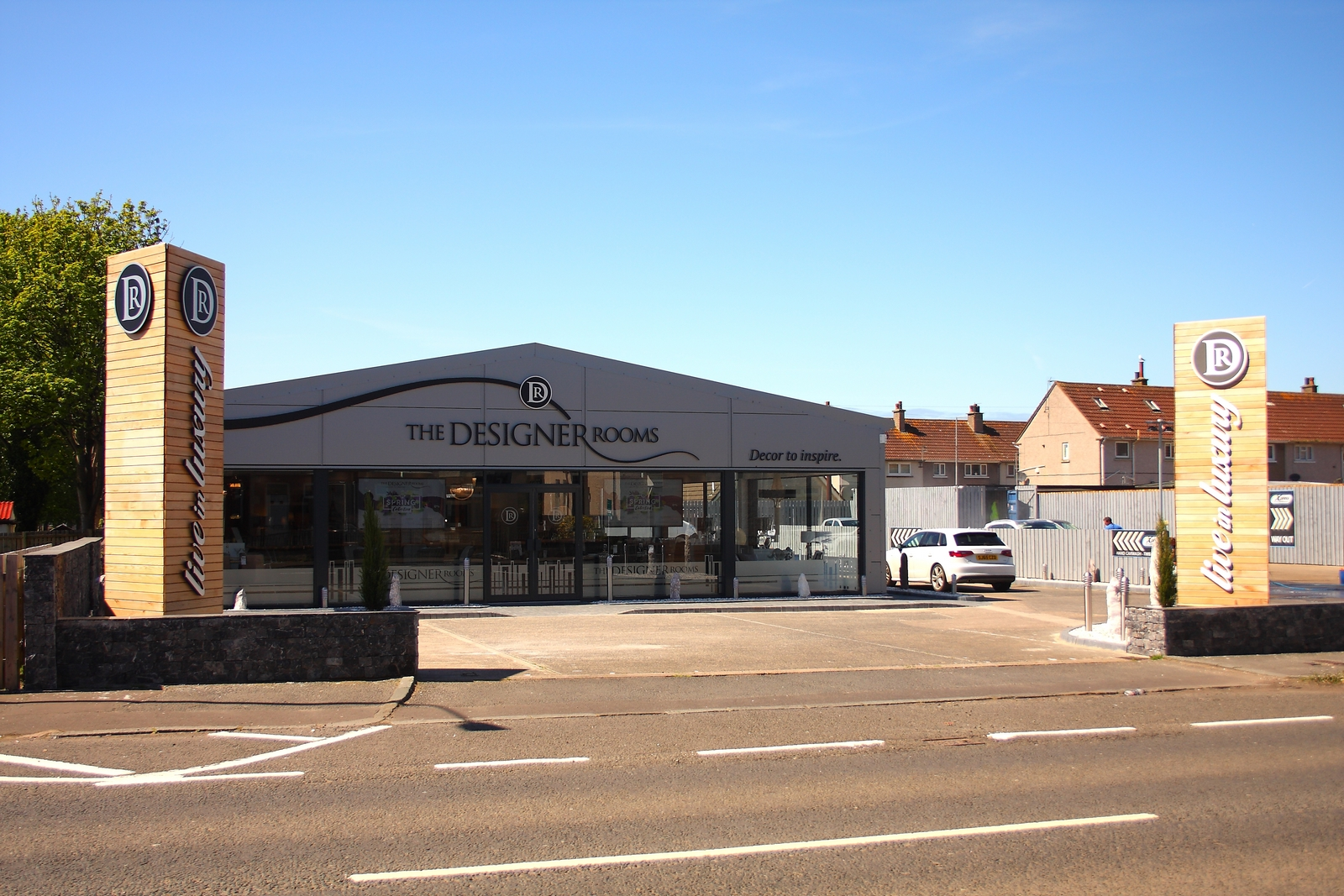
The Designer Rooms former showroom in Irvine, North Ayrshire which closed in 2024 to merge with the Kilmarnock store

In October 2020, the Royal Bank of Scotland invested $1.11 million (£850,000) in the business through a loan. The loan was secured by the business in order to assist the company through the implications on the retail sector as a result of the COVID-19 pandemic in Scotland. By 2021, the business had a projected turnover of around £17 million.

In February 2024, The Designer Rooms announced it would be closing its showroom in Irvine, North Ayrshire in order to merge with their showroom in Kilmarnock ahead of its acquisition of a larger premises within the Kilmarnock town centre. The Kilmarnock superstore will be the largest showroom to be operated by the company, with the 36000 sq. ft store located on Fowlds Street in the town set to undergo renovation works. The Fowlds Street store was originally due to open in the summer period of 2024.

The Designer Rooms began to manufacturer their own range of home fragrances known as Sensum in during the early 2020s, and between August–September 2024, Sensum began manufacturing reed diffusers for sale, which were included in The Designer Rooms showrooms for general public sale. In September 2024, Sensum launched a new range of premium reed diffusers. The range includes three diffuser sizes – 150ml, 500ml and 1000ml – and available in African Sunset, Brazilian Nights, Clear Water, Spa, Indian Summer and Signature Scent.

=== Recent history ===
In early 2024, The Designer Rooms acquired the former Poundstretcher store at Fowlds Street in Kilmarnock, despite already trading from premises in the towns Campbell Street. The Designer Rooms announced a major refurbishment of the Fowlds Street store, with plans to develop the Kilmarnock store into the companies flagship store. Plans were submitted to East Ayrshire Council, initially with an expected opening during the summer period, however, several concerns from the planning department of East Ayrshire Council resulted in the progression of the plans and opening being delayed. Despite delays, The Designer Rooms began using the Fowlds Street store as a clearance outlet in preparation to shift company stock ahead of the official opening of the new store.

Preparations formally began at the companies existing Campbell Street store in Kilmarnock ahead of moving to Fowlds Street in mid–late 2025. In September 2025, the company announced that it would close one of its flagship stores within the Silverburn Shopping Centre in Glasgow by the end of 2025 as a result of their lease agreement expiring. A spokesperson for the company said that whilst they were "gutted" at the decision to close the Silverburn store, the company had some "exciting projects happening" across the company. In the same week, The Designer Rooms announced the opening of a new clearance outlet at Braehead Shopping Centre.

The companies new flagship store officially opened in May 2026 in Kilmarnock at Fowlds Street, replacing the existing Kilmarnock store located in Campbell Street.

== Operations ==
=== Showrooms ===
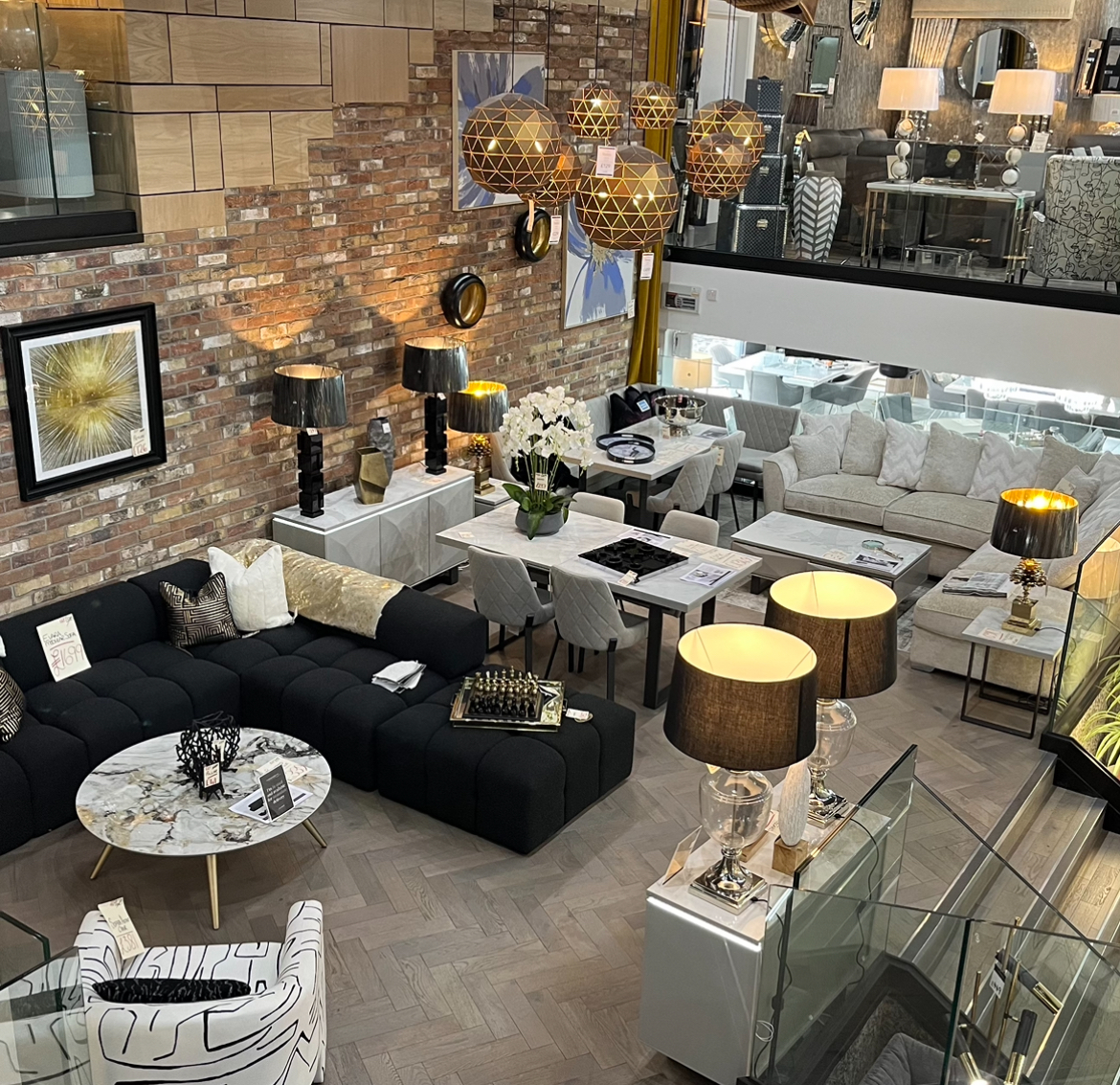
Interior of the Prestwick Road showroom located in Ayr

Each showroom within the company showcases its own unique collections across its store, with the products sold by The Designer Rooms being sourced from internationally. A uniqueness of the business is that most of the stock sold by the company are unavailable from other furniture retailers across the United Kingdom. In June 2024, General Manager of The Designer Rooms announced that the company was opening its first concept store, The Bedrooms, located within Braehead Retail Park.

Each individual showroom is designed and merchandised by a team of specialists from across the United Kingdom, with the company stating that each showroom must "maintain the high end and consistent Designer Room standard". All Designer Rooms showrooms follow a similar structure to the companies other showrooms.

=== National expansion ===
By 2024, The Designer Rooms had expanded the business to open showrooms in Uddingston and Livingston. As of September 2024, both the Irvine and Wishaw showrooms had closed, with the Irvine showroom being merged into the Kilmarnock showroom when it opens a new unit at Fowlds Street in Kilmarnock. In 2025, a new clearance outlet opened at Robroyston Retail Park in Glasgow to replace the former clearance outlet in Wishaw, which closed in 2024.

=== Operational locations ===
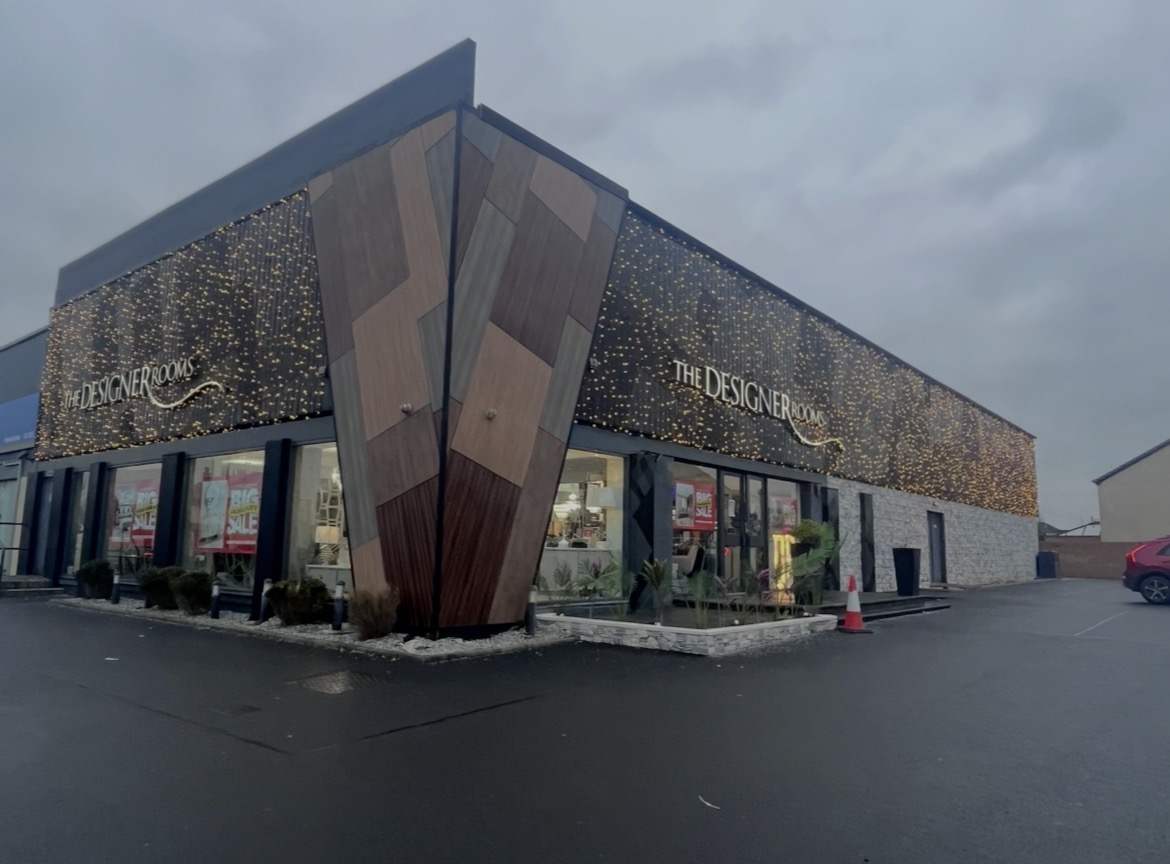
The Designer Rooms showroom in Ayr

- Braehead, Renfrewshire
  - The Designer Rooms (Main Showroom)
  - The Designer Rooms Clearance Outlet
- Coatbridge, North Lanarkshire
- Kilmarnock, East Ayrshire (flagship store)
- Ayr, South Ayrshire
- Robroyston (Glasgow), Glasgow City (within Robroyston Retail Park)
  - The Designer Rooms Clearance Outlet
- Uddingston, South Lanarkshire
- Livingston, West Lothian

=== Former locations ===
- Irvine, North Ayrshire (closed March 2024)
- Wishaw, North Lanarkshire (closed July 2024)
- Glasgow, Glasgow City (within Silverburn Shopping Centre, closed December 2025)

== See also ==
- List of companies of Scotland
