= Shiva Corporation =

- Type: Public
- Industry: Computer networking
- Founded: 1985; 41 years ago in Cambridge, Massachusetts
- Founder: Frank Slaughter; Daniel J. Schwinn
- Defunct: 1998; 28 years ago
- Fate: Acquired by Intel
- Website: shiva.com at the Wayback Machine (archived 1998-02-04)

Shiva Corporation was a company that specialized in computer networking and associated equipment, in particular remote access products. The company was founded in 1985, in Cambridge, Massachusetts, United States. Shiva was co-founded by Massachusetts Institute of Technology (MIT) graduates Frank Slaughter and by Daniel J. Schwinn, the current president and CEO of Avidyne Corporation.

Shiva added to its product portfolio with the acquisition of FastPath, an AppleTalk/Ethernet Gateway from Novell Inc. in 1990.

Shiva acquired the British network products company Spider Systems in 1995, which became Shiva Europe Ltd.

In 1996, Shiva acquired the Cupertino, California-based remote networking software supplier AirSoft Inc for around 65 million USD. This acquisition gave Shiva AirSoft's Powerburst software, which aimed to improve remote-access performance (speed and accuracy) by caching files on the client and validating data in the cache prior to fulfilling subsequent access requests. AirSoft's president at the time was Jagdeep Singh, who went on to co-found QuantumScape in 2010.

Users of 16-bit Internet Explorer on Windows 3 with dial-up connections saw the Shiva name regularly, as the company provided part of the dial-up TCP/IP stack for Internet Explorer versions 3, 4 and 5.

In October 1998 Shiva was acquired by Intel and became part of the Intel Network Products Division. Intel's acquisition of Shiva took place during a lengthy class-action lawsuit in which it was alleged that Shiva hid information concerning the deterioration of the company. The lawsuit was settled in 1999 with Shiva agreeing to pay 4.35 million USD.

In November 2002 it was acquired by Simple Access Inc., which adopted the Shiva Corporation identity. A year later, the company was acquired by Mernet Secure Network. Mernet were subsequently acquired by Eicon Networks in February 2004. Since 2006, Eicon are now known as Dialogic Corporation.
