= Daniel J. Schwinn =

American businessman

Daniel J. Schwinn is an American businessman, a graduate of Massachusetts Institute of Technology, the co-founder of Shiva Corporation, and the founder and current President & CEO of Avidyne Corporation.

== Biography ==
After graduation, Schwinn launched Shiva, a global communications equipment manufacturer that grew to sales of $150M and 500 employees. Dan was president from 1985 until 1993 and chairman until 1995. During Schwinn's tenure at Shiva, the company had the leading share in its markets and provided outstanding returns to its investors, reaching a $2.6 billion market capitalization.

Schwinn founded Avidyne Corporation in 1995 to bring sophisticated electronic instrumentation to general aviation aircraft. He currently flies a TBM850 and a Lake Renegade seaplane, and he is also type-rated in the Falcon 10 jet. He is on the Visiting Committee on Aeronautics and Astronautics at MIT, a board member of the General Aviation Manufacturers Association (GAMA), the Small Aircraft Manufacturers Association (SAMA), and a director of the Experimental Aircraft Association (EAA).
