= Toun Okewale Sonaiya =

Nigerian radio broadcaster

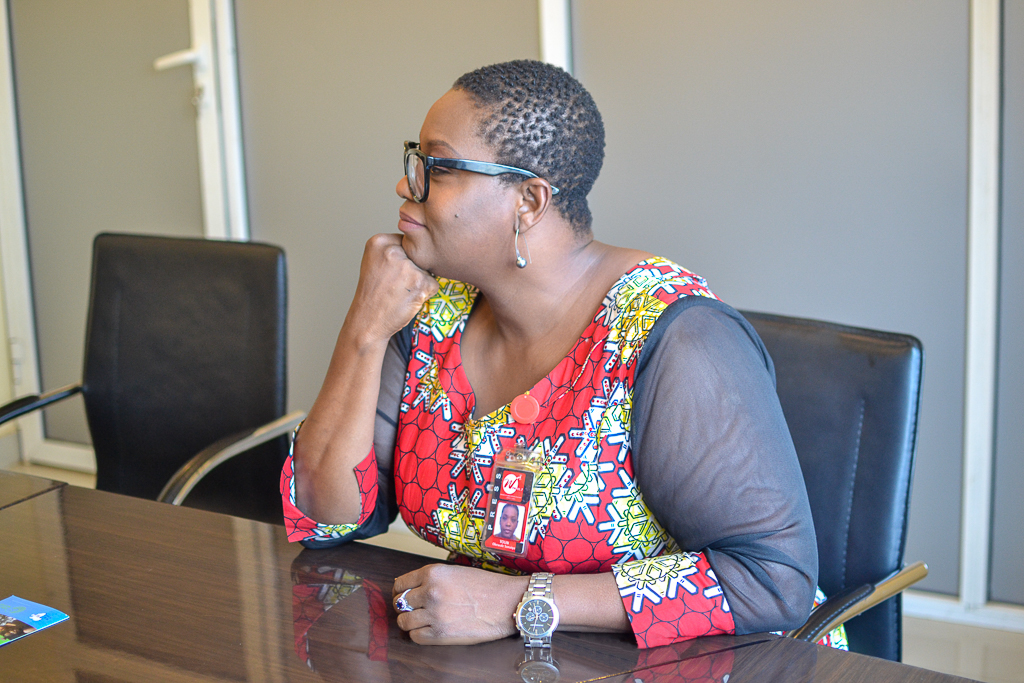
- Born: Toun Okewale; Abeokuta, Ogun State, Nigeria
- Other name: Toun Okewale Sonaiya
- Education: Abeokuta Girls Grammar School; Ogun State University; Trans Atlantic College, United Kingdom
- Occupations: Business magnate; broadcaster; motivational speaker
- Years active: 2002–present
- Organization: Women FM
- Known for: Establishing first indigenous West Africa women radio.
- Website: wfm.org

Toun Okewale Sonaiya is a Nigerian radio broadcaster. In 2015, she launched WFM 91.7, the first radio station for women in Nigeria. Sonaiya is also the CEO of WFM 91.7 .

== Biography ==
Sonaiya previously worked for Ogun State Broadcasting Corporation, Ray Power and Choice FM. She has also worked with Housing for Women, and been the executive director at St. Ives Communications. Toun Okewale Sonaiya is a media entrepreneur and broadcaster who has practiced in Nigeria and London.

In an interview she was asked at what point did she decide "she wanted to start a specialized radio station for women"?

Sonaiya replied "Precisely 2010 when 2 of my directors and I decided to activate our vision for a female - centric radio station, something different to complement existing radio stations . We applied to NBC under St Ives Communications Ltd. In June 2016 we got a license and to the Glory of God within 6 months on 18th of December 2016 – we launched."

== Career ==
One of the success stories of Women Radio under Toun's leadership comes from "TheWomenAgenda" – a programme aimed at mainstreaming women and girls as drivers of the anti-corruption and accountability campaign in Nigeria. This intervention has student and women led #genderandaccountability clubs that lead campaigns at local levels to ensure allocated resources are effectively utilized. This initiative is currently active in Lagos and Ogun state with plans to expand nationwide.

She was the first African female voice of BBC's "One for all" educational campaign in Africa, the first voice on Ogun Radio FM and the first African female presenter and producer at Choice 107.1 FM (now Capital Extra, London ). She has interviewed personalities including the late Miriam Makeba, Ladysmith Black Mambazo from South Africa, Manu Dibango, Oumou Sangare, Professor Remi Sonaiya, Nigeria's feminist, Erelu Bisi Fayemi, etc. She moderates and comperes conferences and seminars on the national and International sphere.

Okewale Sonaiya is a board member, director and trustee of several organizations including Centre for Women's Health and Information, Transformative Leadership and Sustainable Initiative, Maami (an NGO empowering disadvantaged Women & Girls), Ives Medicare, Nigerian Electricity Regulatory Commission's (NERC) Review Code Panel and founding member of Nigerian Women in diaspora.
