= A Trampwoman's Tragedy =

1903 narrative poem by Thomas Hardy

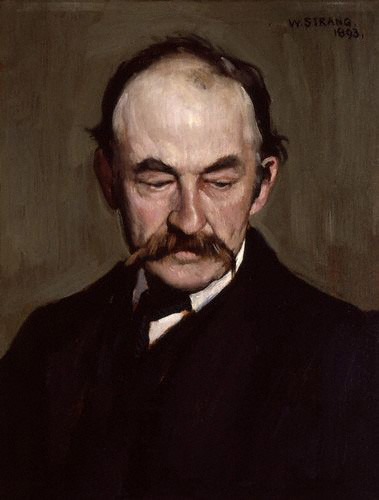
Portrait of Hardy by William Strang, 1893

"A Trampwoman's Tragedy" is a 1903 narrative poem in 104 lines by Thomas Hardy. Hardy ranked the poem highly amongst his works, and came to believe that it was "upon the whole his most successful poem."

== Synopsis ==
The poem features a homeless "trampwoman" and her three companions, travelling the open road in rural England. Her companions include her lover, whom she calls her "fancy man", another man named Jeering John, and an older woman named Mother Lee. As they're walking along, the trampwoman teases her lover by allowing Jeering John to place his arm around her waist. The group comes to an inn where they stop to rest. The trampwoman continues to tease her lover by sitting next to Jeering John, and then sitting on his lap. Her lover begins to get angry and asks her if the baby she's carrying is his or Jeering John's. She nods to him as if the baby were Jeering John's in order to tease him more. Her lover goes into a rage at this, pulls out a knife, and stabs Jeering John to death. He is later hanged for the crime. On the day of his execution the trampwoman has a miscarriage. Mother Lee died before the execution, and so the trampwoman is left all alone. At the end of the poem, as the trampwoman lies under a tree, the ghost of her lover appears to her, asking whether the child was his or not. She tells him that she had never touched another man after they had sworn themselves to each other, and he disappears with a smile. The trampwoman lives on, wandering alone, "haunting the Western Moor."

== Publication ==
The poem was written in 1902 at Max Gate. It was initially rejected by the Cornhill Magazine because the editors felt it might be found morally offensive. It was eventually published in the North American Review in November 1903.

Hardy had enthusiastically offered the poem to the editors of the Cornhill Magazine, writing to them "I send you up a rendering in ballad form of a West Country tragedy of the last century which seems to me to have a lurid picturesqueness suitable for such treatment, and to be sufficiently striking." The poem was included in the collection Time's Laughingstocks in 1909. Hardy decided not to include "A Trampwoman's Tragedy" in his Selected Poems (1916), but added it to his revised version of that collection, Chosen Poems (1929).

== Critical reception ==
The poet David A. Munro, editor of the North American Review, which first published the poem, shared Hardy's enthusiasm for it. The critic Edmund Gosse praised the poem, and the American artist Rockwell Kent considered illustrating it, before choosing another of Hardy's poems to be published with his artwork. "A Trampwoman's Tragedy" is today one of Hardy's most popular poems.

== Adaptations ==
The poem formed the basis of a ballet called The Vagabonds, with choreography by Anthony Burke and music by John Ireland, which was premiered at Sadler's Wells Theatre on October 29, 1946 .
