= The Carbon Removers =

CO2 removal company

- Formerly: Dry Ice Scotland, Carbon Capture Scotland
- Company type: Private
- Industry: Carbon capture, removal, storage and utilisation company
- Founded: January 2012
- Founders: Richard and Ed Nimmons
- Headquarters: Edinburgh, Scotland
- Area served: Europe
- Products: Permanent Carbon Removal Credits, Biogenic Dry Ice
- Website: The Carbon Removers

The Carbon Removers, formerly known as Carbon Capture Scotland, is a Scottish company specializing in engineered biogenic carbon dioxide (CO_{2}) removal. Co-founded by brothers Richard and Ed Nimmons, the company has grown from its origins in dry ice production to become a provider of carbon removal credits and permanent CO_{2} storage solutions.

== History ==
The Carbon Removers founded in 2012 as Dry Ice Scotland (CCS) in Perthshire, focusing on capturing CO_{2} emissions to produce dry ice for industries like pharmaceuticals, food storage, and cleaning. In 2021, with investment from Nash Business Capital, operations were expanded, and the company relocated to Dumfries.

In 2022, the company rebranded as Carbon Capture Scotland to reflect its shift toward carbon removal. This included capturing biogenic CO_{2} emissions and using them for industrial purposes or permanently sequestering them underground. In 2024, it became The Carbon Removers, reflecting its growing international presence and focus on scalable engineered removals.

== Projects ==
=== Dry ice production ===
The company operates one of the UK's largest renewable CO_{2}-based dry ice manufacturing facilities, producing over 10,000 tons of dry ice annually and contributing to the resilience of the UK's CO_{2} supply chain.

=== Carbon removal in the UK ===
The Carbon Removers is active in carbon removal operations across the UK. The company captures biogenic CO_{2} emissions from industries such as whisky distillation and biogas plants, repurposing the CO_{2} for industrial uses or permanently storing it with its mineralisation partners or storing it underground in disused oil and gas fields where available. Key customers and partners include airlines, major banks and software companies.

=== Scandinavian expansion ===
In 2024, the company launched its Scandinavian expansion, marking its entry into the European carbon removal market. A key achievement was securing a contract with the Danish government to provide biogenic carbon removal credits as part of Denmark’s fund for negative CO_{2} emissions (NECCS fund).

The Carbon Removers is also a participant in Project Greensand, focusing on permanent geological CO_{2} storage in the North Sea. Starting in 2026, the company will deliver 50,000 tons of biogenic CO_{2} annually for permanent storage. While this contract is not exclusive, it represents the first agreement awarded to a UK-based company for North Sea geological storage.

== Recognitions ==
- In 2023, Richard and Ed Nimmons were recognized by the Institute of Directors (IoD) Scotland for their achievements in sustainability and innovation in carbon removal.
