= Avidyne Corporation =

American Aerospace Company

- Type: Private
- Industry: Aerospace
- Founded: 1994
- Headquarters: Melbourne, FL
- Key people: Daniel J. Schwinn (President and CEO)
- Products: Avionics
- Website: Avidyne.com

Avidyne Corporation is an avionics company based in Melbourne, Florida. Avidyne is developer of Integrated Avionics Systems, multi-function displays, and traffic advisory systems for light general aviation (GA) aircraft. Headquartered in Melbourne, Florida, the company has facilities in Melbourne, as well as Concord, Massachusetts; Columbus, Ohio; and Boulder, Colorado.

== History ==
President and CEO Daniel J. Schwinn founded Avidyne in 1994. Avidyne pioneered the standalone MFD market when they certified their first Flight Situation Display system in 1997. Avidyne's FlightMax Entegra line was first released in 2003 in the Cirrus SR22—the first big-glass flight deck system for light general aviation aircraft. On November 3, 2005, Avidyne Corporation and Ryan International Company announced a merger of the two companies. Ryan International was founded in 1981 by CEO Paul Ryan, inventor of the Stormscope weather system.

Avidyne was recognized as Avionics Magazine's "Small Manufacturer of the Year" and was inducted into the Avionics Magazine Hall of Fame in 1999. Avidyne received the NASA 2001 Commitment to Excellence Award for their work on the AGATE HITS program for their work on “Highway in the Sky” (HITS) display technology, as part of NASA's AGATE (Advanced General Aviation Transport Experiments) Alliance. Avidyne successfully demonstrated HITS technology at EAA AirVenture 2001 in Oshkosh, Wisconsin. In 2017, Avidyne Corporation certified Synthetic Vision capability for all of its IFD-Series GPS-based Flight Management Systems. Avidyne achieved FAA certification for its Vantage retrofit glass panel in Cirrus SR2x aircraft in 2025.

== Products ==
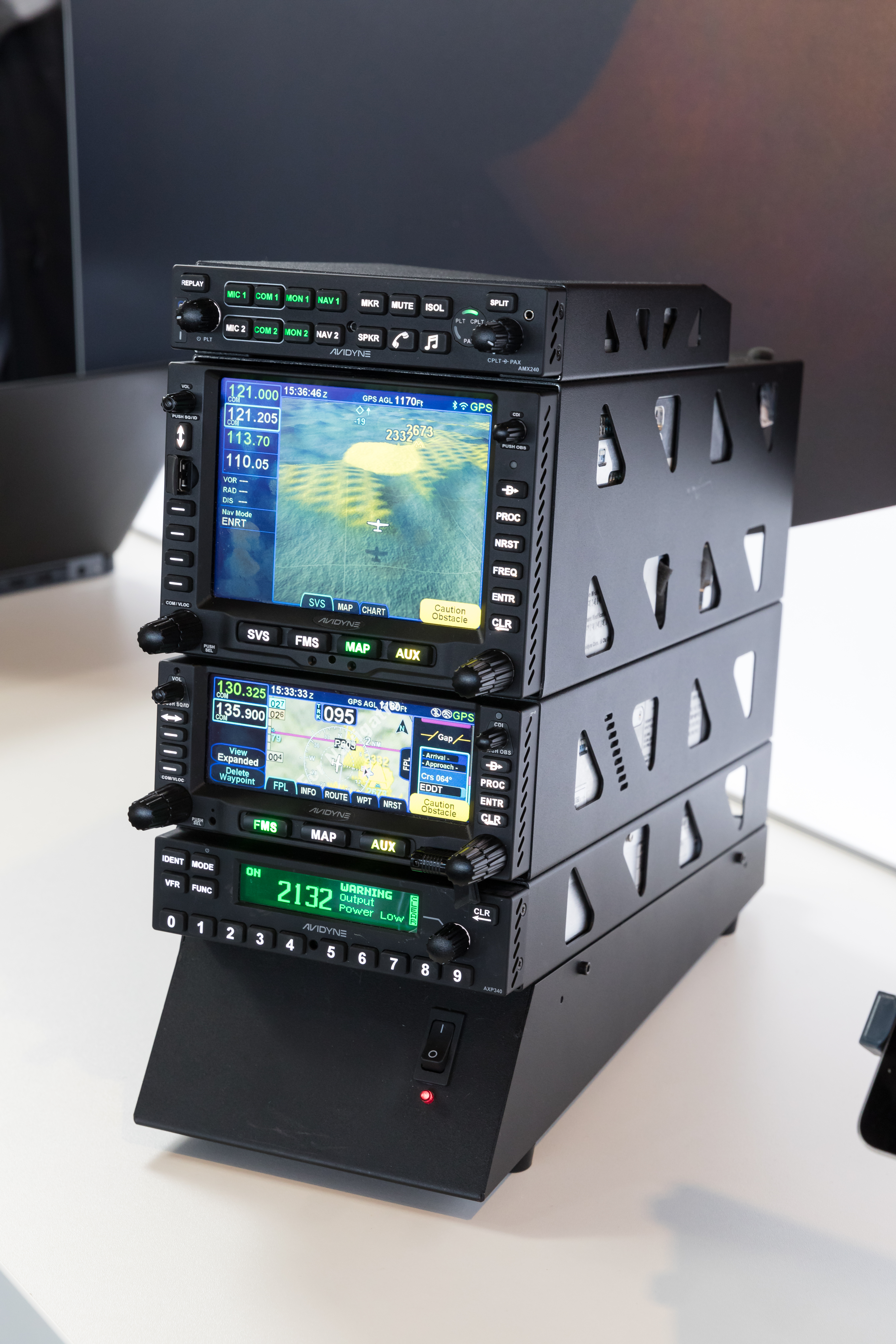
Array of Avidyne avionics

- Helios Flight Management System for Helicopters
- Atlas Flight Management System
- Entegra & Entegra Release 9 Integrated Flight Deck Systems
- IFD550 FMS/GPS/NAV/COM
- IFD540 FMS/GPS/NAV/COM
- IFD440 FMS/GPS/NAV/COM
- AMX240 Audio Panel
- AXP340 Mode S Transponder w/ADS-B OUT
- AXP322 Mode S Remote Transponder w/ADS-B OUT
- EX600 MultiFunction Display (MFD)
- SkyTrax100 ADS-B IN Receiver
- TWX670 Color Tactical Lightning Detection System
- CMax Electronic Approach Charts & Airport Diagrams
- TAS600 Series Traffic Advisory Systems
- DFC90 Autopilot

== See also ==
- L-3 Communications
- Garmin
