= Visioncall =

Visioncall Ltd
- Industry: Domiciliary Eye Care, Home Care, Opticians, Domiciliary Care
- Founded: 1994
- Headquarters: Cambuslang, Scotland, UK
- Area served: United Kingdom
- Key people: Brian McGuire, Rickey Pooran, Martin Gallagher
- Owner: Community Eyecare
- Website: www.vision-call.co.uk

Visioncall was established in 1994 and is a home visiting optician that provides free home eye tests for the elderly and housebound in the United Kingdom. Visioncall also specialise in domiciliary eye care for care homes, hearing screening, and dental care.

== Branches ==
The Visioncall head office is based in Cambuslang, Scotland. They also have branches in Doncaster, Manchester, Newcastle, Surrey, Bristol, Essex, Birmingham, Wales and Ireland.

== Services ==
- Free Eye Tests
- Domiciliary Eye Care
- Hearing Screening
- Training for Care Home Staff

== Products ==
- Low Vision Aids
- Hearing Accessories
- Dementia Signage
- Digital Hearing Aids

== Awards ==
Visioncall has twice been ranked in the Sunday Times Top 100 Fast Track Companies. They ranked number 38 in 2006 and number 71 in 2007

The owners of Visioncall were named as finalists for the Ernst & Young Scottish Entrepreneur of the Year Awards
