= Spider Systems =

Scottish tech company

Spider Systems Ltd. was a computer network products company, based in Edinburgh. It was founded in 1983 by several former employees of ICL who had previously worked at ICL's Scottish Development Centre at Dalkeith Palace until its closure earlier that year.

Spider Systems produced a wide range of products, including terminal servers, routers, network bridges, network analysers and network protocol software stacks for various operating systems, including the TCP/IP stack used in Microsoft Windows NT 3.1.

The company was acquired by Shiva Corporation in 1995, becoming Shiva Europe Ltd. Shiva were themselves acquired by Intel in 1998, and Shiva Europe Ltd. was liquidated the following year.

The Spider brand was revived in 1996 when the network software division of the business was bought back from Shiva by one of the founders and renamed Spider Software Ltd.. This company was later sold to Artesyn Technologies (which subsequently became part of Emerson Electric Company) in 2000. On 9 October 2008 Emerson started the process of closing down the former Spider Software Ltd site, and the office closed at the end of October 2009.
