= Cashmaster International =

Company in Scotland

Cashmaster International Ltd
- Company type: Private Limited Company
- Industry: Cash management
- Founded: 1977 in Scotland
- Headquarters: Dalgety Bay, Scotland, UK
- Key people: Gordon McKie, CEO
- Website: www.cashmaster.com

Cashmaster International is a manufacturer of money counting machines based in Dalgety Bay, Scotland. The company makes machines that count cash by weight, an alternative to counting cash manually or using a traditional friction based banknote counter.

== History ==
The company was founded in 1977 as a provider of bespoke electronic equipment using core microprocessor applications. In 1987 Cashmaster International was formed, providing count by weight machines. The company introduced a modern production facility in 2007.

== Cashmaster device on the BBC ==
Noel's House Party was a popular BBC television show in the 1990s which featured a competition called Grab-A-Grand in which a celebrity would grab as much money as possible in a minute from a clear booth pumped with air and filled with notes. At the end of the minute the money had to be counted quickly and it was a bespoke Cashmaster machine which was used on stage to do this.

== Present company ==
Cashmaster currently has offices in the UK, Germany, Hong Kong, and the US. Their Head Office and manufacturing plant are in Dalgety Bay, Scotland. They currently have clients in over 50 countries.

Cashmaster has been noted in the press for working with HMV.
