= Noel's House Party =

British light entertainment TV series (1991–1999)

- The title card used from series 4 to 5.
- Genre: Entertainment
- Written by: Malcolm Williamson; Noel Edmonds; Charlie Adams; Garry Chambers; Richard Lewis; Kevin Gill; Stuart Silver; Louis Robinson; Ashley Boroda; Nigel Crowle
- Directed by: Guy Freeman; Duncan Cooper; Michael Leggo; Phil Chilvers; Penny Ewing; Patrick Cowap
- Presented by: Noel Edmonds
- Theme music composer: Ernie Dunstall (1991–1998); Stephen Green (1996–1998); "House of Fun" by Madness (1998–1999); "Having A Party" by The Osmonds (1998–1999)
- Country of origin: United Kingdom
- Original language: English
- No. of series: 9
- No. of episodes: 169 (+ 15 specials)

Production
- Executive producer: Michael Leggo
- Producers: Mike Brosnan; Jonathan Beazley; Michael Leggo; Guy Freeman; John McHugh; Philip Kampff
- Production location: BBC Television Centre
- Editor: John Sillito
- Running time: 45–65 minutes

Original release
- Network: BBC One
- Release: 23 November 1991 – 20 March 1999

Related
- The Late, Late Breakfast Show; The Noel Edmonds Saturday Roadshow

Noel's House Party was a BBC light entertainment series hosted by Noel Edmonds. Set in a large house in the fictional village of Crinkley Bottom, leading to much innuendo, it ran from 23 November 1991 to 20 March 1999 on BBC One and was broadcast live on Saturday evenings for eight series. The show, once described by a senior corporation executive as "the most important show on the BBC", was cancelled in February 1999 due to declining ratings, although two further compilation specials were shown in March 2000.

In 2010, Noel's House Party was voted the best Saturday night TV show of all time. In August 2022, an episode of the show, the tenth episode of the first series (originally broadcast on 1 February 1992), was repeated on BBC Four. This marked the first time since 2000 that the show had been broadcast on the BBC. In July 2024, it was announced that the show would get another repeat on BBC Four, on 3 August, showing the nineteenth episode of the third series (originally broadcast on 5 March 1994).

== History ==
Noel's House Party was the successor to The Noel Edmonds Saturday Roadshow, carrying over some of its regular features such as the 'Gunge Tank', the 'Gotcha Oscar' and 'Wait Till I Get You Home'.

The show had many celebrity guests posing as residents of Crinkley Bottom, including Frank Thornton and Vicki Michelle. It gave birth to Mr Blobby in the Gotcha segment. There was also a contrived rivalry between Edmonds and Tony Blackburn. One-off celebrity appearances included Michael Crawford as Frank Spencer, who came in to find the whole audience dressed as Frank after comedian Stuart Henderson had performed as Frank singing The Beatles' "I Saw Her Standing There" and Ken Dodd in a highwayman's outfit—"going cheap at the Maxwell sale"—as Noel's long-lost 'twin', Berasent Edmonds (a play on Bury St Edmunds).

After several changes, the show began to decline in popularity. Its theme tune was changed in 1996, and set redesigns followed. The episode due to be broadcast on 3 January 1998 had to be cancelled after a disagreement between Edmonds and the BBC. The budget had been cut by 10%, with the money saved being used to help fund the BBC digital switchover. Edmonds reportedly walked out, claiming the show was "of a poor standard and cobbled together".

The BBC cancelled the show in February 1999 after ratings plummeted from a high of 15 million to 8 million. Edmonds closed the final episode of House Party on 20 March 1999 by saying:

It's an overworked expression when people say 'it's the end of an era', but for BBC Television for the entertainment department, for me, and possibly you, it really is the end of an era. I hope your memory will be very kind to us after 169 [episodes]... bye.

In a statement, Edmonds said:

I am delighted this decision has been made. I feel as though a huge weight has been lifted off my shoulders. History will prove that House Party was one of the most successful entertainment shows of all time.

=== Awards ===
In 1993, Noel's House Party won a BAFTA for best light entertainment series.

In 1994, the opening titles won a Bronze Rose of Montreux. The stop-motion animation title and credit sequences were made by 3 Peach Animation.

== Regular features ==
=== Gotcha ===
Originally called the 'Gotcha Oscars' until the threat of legal action from the Academy of Motion Picture Arts and Sciences (which also prompted a redesign of the award), where hidden camera practical jokes were played on celebrities (these were pre-recorded during the months the show was off air). Notable victims were Barbara Windsor, Carol Vorderman, Jill Dando, Kriss Akabusi, Lionel Blair, Dave Lee Travis, Richard Whiteley, Eddie Large, Samantha Janus, Jeremy Clarkson, Yvette Fielding, Status Quo, and the Queens Park Rangers football club. In the final episode of series 5, Dale Winton turned the tables on Edmonds with a surprise challenge that ended with a gunging. Another notable victim was Annabel Giles, the first victim who managed to spot the hidden camera, which had been placed in the back of a car, which meant the prank backfired. This feature originated in The Noel Edmonds Saturday Roadshow.

=== Wait Till I Get You Home ===
Parents watch pre-recorded clips of their children being interviewed by Edmonds, and try to guess the children's answers. In series 5, it was replaced with Wait Till We All Get Home, but was then axed for series 6 and not replaced. It did however make a one-off return in the final episode. This complete segment was pre-recorded some months before each series of the show began, and originated in The Noel Edmonds Saturday Roadshow.

=== The Lyric Game ===
In series 1, celebrity duos competed against one another to complete the lyrics of a song after being given the first line. This feature was originally in The Noel Edmonds Saturday Roadshow. In series 2, members of the public had to guess the name of the song from the lyrics, but this was replaced in series 3 with the panel game.

=== Grab a Grand ===
A phone-in competition where a viewer chose from three currencies (aiming to select the greatest value of money: £1,000 in the first two episodes), and a celebrity (usually a sports star like Graham Gooch, Frank Bruno, Kathy Tayler, Kriss Akabusi, Nick Gillingham, Henry Cooper, Stephen Hendry, Steve Davis, David Gower, Gary Lineker, John Regis, Paul Gascoigne, John Barnes, Lennox Lewis, and others) would climb into a perspex box containing a fan and a large quantity of banknotes selected by the call-in contestant. The celebrity had to grab as many of the notes as possible as they were blown around by the fan.

Before the game starts, a chosen player is picked from the call in contestants who got a question correct during the show or from a previous week's show to be picked, there would be three different bundles of money, usually two known countries and one bundle known as the "Crinkley Bottom Groats" which was pegged to a generally random country, all valued within £1,000, sometimes more or sometimes less. Noel would ask the caller three questions based on that week's news. Each correct answer gave the celebrity 20 seconds in the box (up to a total of 60 seconds) accompanied by music and the audience counting down from ten to one.

The format was changed slightly in series 4, in which the caller could choose a member of the studio audience to do the "grand grabbing" (the audience member would win the same amount of money the caller won). A few quirks were also added in, including some modified moments: balloons inside the box, the walls falling down, allowing audience members to help, the door jammed, cheating, the machine broken, being flipped for Number Cruncher and inside a woman's house when NTV happened.

Then, in the first episode of Series Five, the box was blown up live during the show and the segment was revamped with the entire studio audience now playing grabbing notes that were being blown around by two large industrial fans as the celebrity would run into to collect, rather than having the three currencies, instead it featured the groats as the main currency, mixed within the groats would be "Golden Groats" worth £50 each if collected.

There was also an incident when one of the callers had the same name, but it turned out it was not the person who had called in: the real call-in contestant had their Grab a Grand game at the start of the next episode, as this one featured the grab a grand around the grand house track. Towards the end of series 5, variations were introduced: 'Grab a Granny', 'Grab a Grand Piano', and 'Grab a Grand National' etc. The money was quickly counted on stage using a Cashmaster counting machine. The last Grab a Grand was done on the last episode of series 5 (coincidentally, the 100th episode and the last person to play Grab a Grand was Frank Bruno).

Grab a Grand was then replaced with Cash for Questions in series 6, nothing in series 7, and Sofa Soccer in series 8.

=== NTV ===
A camera was hidden in the home of a member of the public and Edmonds would talk to them through their television. Some would be shocked, others bemused, and others would simply try to run away. Whatever the reaction, they would subsequently end up doing some embarrassing performance in their living room or garden. Celebrity victims included Chris Evans, Garry Bushell and Dale Winton. The feature was given a twist in the final series, becoming NTV: YOYO (You're On Your Own).

=== The Gunge Tank ===
Carried over from The Noel Edmonds Saturday Roadshow, the gunge tank was put to various uses, usually gunging celebrities or unpopular members of the public after a phone vote was carried out during the show. Gunging usually took place in the final minutes of the show.

The 'gunge' was a food-thickening agent called Natrosol, coloured with various food dyes. The gunge tank got progressively more sophisticated. From series 1 a standard tank was used, with an ornate look to it. Series 2 introduced foam (often coloured) which would rise up from the bottom and cover the victim prior to the gunging. Series 3 introduced the 'Car Wash', where the individual was carried along a lengthier tank entering and then going through a set of brushes designed to soak the victim, then having the gunge descend from above before being spun out of the contraption. In series 4 and 5, it was developed into the 'Trip Around The Great House', where the victim was placed on a miniature railway that took them on a journey around the set where gunge was released from different places whilst they were spun in the carriage - foam was also shot from Foam FX Cannons throughout the ride, finishing up in the giant fireplace, where gunge and other surprises (notably soap powder in the Carol Vorderman gunging) was finally released onto the victim. From series 6, there were changes to the format, and gunge was used less frequently; there was also a rubbish truck with a seat that would release different rotten foods and then as the chair carried on, gunge was released on them. Series 7 did not include any type of gunge due to a refurbishment in the house. For series 8, a member of the audience would be gunged by a tank lowered from the studio rafters, or their chair would be lowered into the undercroft of the seating area (where they were gunged) and came back up again.

Edmonds himself often got gunged, usually in the last episode of a series.

=== The Big Pork Pie ===
The Big Pork Pie was a regular feature from series 3 where a member of the audience with an embarrassing secret was seated in a big pork pie, made to wear a lie detector and questioned by Noel. Noel himself was subjected to this on one episode, with Bob Monkhouse taking on the role of question master; it was revealed that Noel's middle name was Ernest.

=== Number Cruncher ===
A regular feature for series 4 and 5, where a phone box modified to contain a gunge tank and a TV screen was placed somewhere in Britain. The code to get into the phone box was broadcast live on air, and the first viewer to reach the phone box got to play a game. Once inside, they had 45 seconds to rearrange a code on the screen to win a prize and get out again. If they ran out of time, they were covered in gunge. If they solved the puzzle, they had an opportunity to gamble their prize. By pulling a handle, they could either double their money, have random objects dropped on them, or be covered in gunge.

=== Beat Your Neighbour ===
One of the main features on series 5, in which two neighbours would run round to each other's house and, in one minute, grab as many belongings as they wanted. Then, following a series of alternate questions, one neighbour would win everything, including their own belongings back.

=== Hot House ===
A pair of top athletes were pitted against each other in a fitness test throughout series 6.

=== Cash for Questions ===
For series 6 only, similar to Grab a Grand.

The first part of the game would be a qualifying question or clue this would be supplied by the professor (Portrayed by Brian Blessed). The professor is given a probe camera and sticks it into random objects (ie a loofah). The second part features a Wheel of Fortune being spun. A person from the audience is strapped horizontally to a wheel (normally someone committing an embarrassing thing). The wheel stops spinning and points to one of eight section and phones. The person on the other end of that phone has to get a question correct. If they get it wrong, the wheel is re-spun. However, if they get it correct then they are given a further three current affairs questions. Each correct answer is worth twenty seconds for B-list celeb to go crazy in the Basement.

In the third part, The Basement is pitch black and the caller, with infra-red camera at their disposal, tries to guide the person through the basement collecting bags of money along the way. Each one was worth £100, with golden ones worth £500. At the end of the time the lights came on, so there was nothing stopping the celebrity grabbing an extra bag or two on the way out. Named after a political scandal.

=== My Little Friend ===
My Little Friend was a pre-recorded feature used from series 6 to 8. This involved small school children being faced with puppets that start talking to them (one voiced by Noel and another by Barry Killerby). In series 7, it was aliens; in the final series, Phibber the Frog and Waffle the Squirrel spoke to the children and sometimes scared them away.

=== The Secret World of the Teenager ===
For series 7, a teenage version of Wait Till I Get You Home. This segment was pre-recorded.

=== Crinkley Bottom: The Soap ===
In first half of series 7, there was Crinkley Bottom: The Soap - a short-lived pre-recorded soap opera chronicling village life.

=== Panel Beaters ===
A celebrity panel game from the second half of series 7, in which celebrities had to spot the imposter from three members of the public with apparently bizarre occupations. If they failed, they got gunged. If they guessed correctly, the three members of the public were gunged instead.

=== Sofa Soccer ===
In the final series, a similar idea to Bernie the Bolt in The Golden Shot, a viewer at home would attempt to score goals by directing a machine to fire a huge football. The commands were 'left', 'right' and 'shoot'. Each goal was worth £400, a maximum of £2,000 could be won if five goals were scored. The music used for this game was based on Crazy Horses by The Osmonds.

=== Three to Go ===
A game from towards the end of series 8. Noel would link up with three regional news programmes, who would each bring an improbable-sounding news story from their region. The contestants would have to guess whether the stories were true or false.

== Mr Blobby ==
In 1992, during series 2 of House Party, the character Mr Blobby was introduced as a way for Noel Edmonds to play practical jokes on celebrities. The success of the character resulted in a large amount of merchandise, public appearances and even theme parks based around the character. Mr Blobby was portrayed by Barry Killerby.

Mr Blobby was dropped from the show after series 7, but made a surprise reappearance in the final ever episode. During that episode, he ordered Edmonds to confess that dropping him from the show was a mistake, telling Edmonds to say "I wouldn't be in this mess if I hadn't sacked him."

=== Crinkley Bottom Theme Parks ===
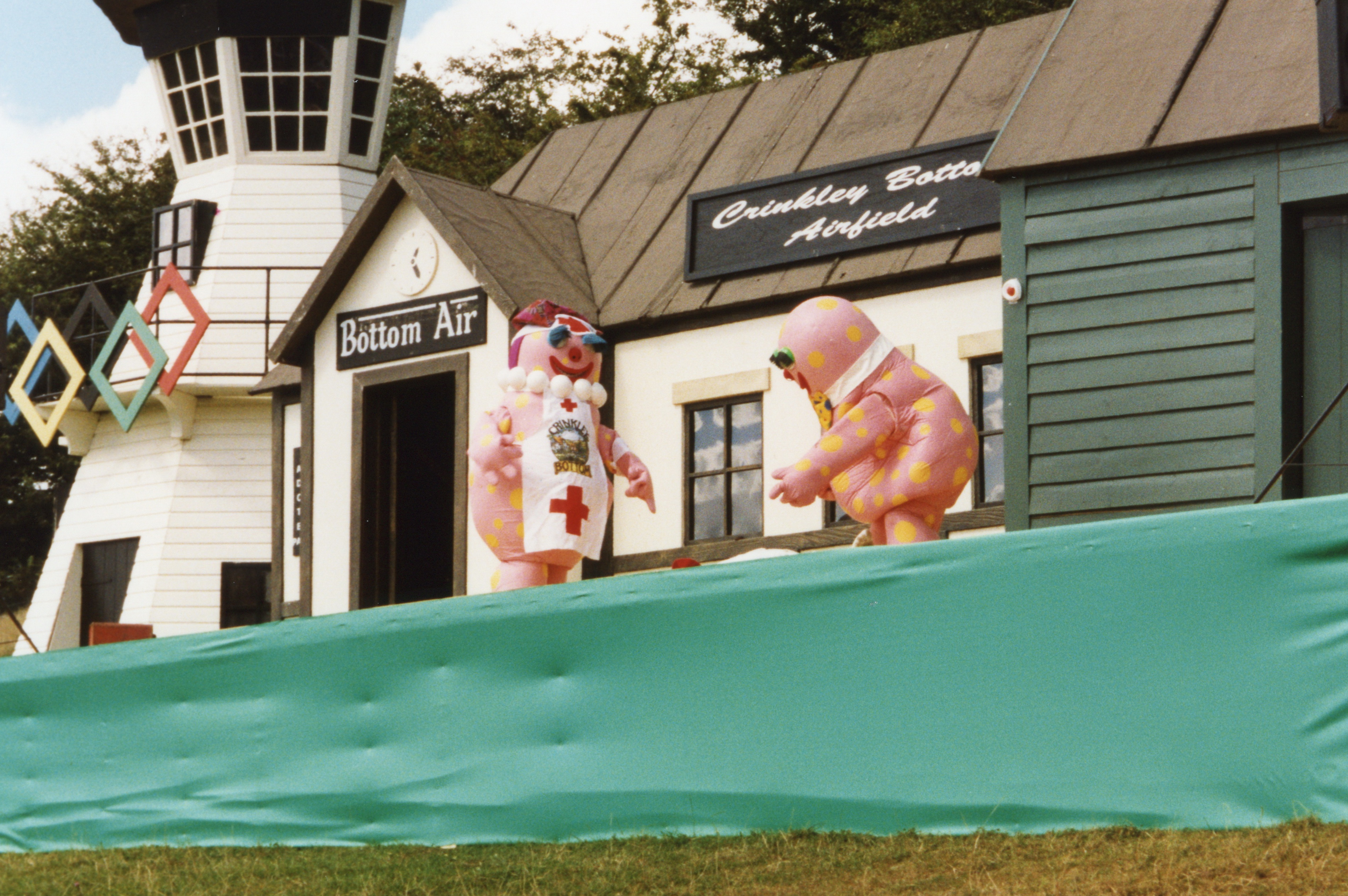
Blobbyland

With the House Party set in the fictional village of Crinkley Bottom, Edmonds opened three Crinkley Bottom attractions at pre-existing theme parks in the UK. The first, based at Cricket St Thomas in Somerset, featured many Mr Blobby attractions and was due to include a replica of the Great House from the series. The park closed in 1998 following dwindling attendance figures.

In 1994, a Crinkley Bottom theme park opened in Morecambe. It closed 13 weeks after opening. A two-year investigation by the district auditor was started due to the investment of £2 million by Lancaster City Council. It resulted in both the Conservatives and Liberal Democrats withdrawing from the cabinet, leaving four councillors from Morecambe Bay Independents and the Green Party running the authority. A third Crinkley Bottom theme park was based at Pleasurewood Hills in Lowestoft, but has since closed.

== Transmissions ==
=== Series ===
Series	Start date	End date	Episodes
1	23 November 1991	28 March 1992	18
2	24 October 1992	13 March 1993	20 (Note: Originally to run for 21 episodes. The show scheduled for 6 March 1993 was cancelled due to an IRA bomb scare at BBC Television Centre, a repeat of the 1991 edition of Noel's Christmas Presents and Tom and Jerry 1944 cartoon, "The Zoot Cat" was shown instead.)
3	23 October 1993	26 March 1994	22
4	22 October 1994	25 March 1995	21
5	21 October 1995	30 March 1996	22
6	19 October 1996	29 March 1997	22
7	18 October 1997	21 March 1998	20 (Note: Originally to run for 22 episodes. The show scheduled for 3 January 1998 was cancelled due to a disagreement between Edmonds and the BBC, a repeat of The Best of Noel's House Party, originally broadcast on 11 October 1997, was shown instead.)
8	17 October 1998	20 March 1999	21

=== Specials ===
Title	Date
The Best of Noel's House Party	31 May 1993
Noel's Garden Party	4 September 1993
The Best of Noel's House Party	29 August 1994
The Gotcha Hall of Fame	3 May 1995
The Gotcha Hall of Fame	17 May 1995
The Gotcha Hall of Fame	30 December 1995
Noel's NTV Stars	18 April 1996
Noel's NTV Stars	25 April 1996
The Best of Noel's House Party	7 September 1996
The Gotcha Hall of Fame	28 December 1996
The Gotcha Hall of Fame	17 July 1997
The Gotcha Hall of Fame	24 July 1997
The Best of Noel's House Party	11 October 1997
Noel's Greatest Gotchas	10 January 1998
Noel's House Party Gotcha Special	13 March 1999
Gullible Travellers - The Best of NTV	19 March 2000
The Best of Noel's House Party	26 March 2000

== International versions and airings ==
Country	Title	Host	Channel
Belgium	Binnen Zonder Bellen	Koen Wauters	VTM
Denmark	Greven På Hittegodset	Eddie Michel	TV 2
Germany	Gottschalks Haus Party	Thomas Gottschalk	Sat.1
Netherlands	Monte Carlo	Carlo Boszhard	RTL 4
Spain	Vaya Nochecita	Pepe Carroll	Telecinco

Repeats of the series also aired on Channel Nine in Australia and on Network 2 in New Zealand throughout the 1990s.
