= Clyde Broadcast =

Clyde Broadcast is a brand associated with the manufacture and supply of studio equipment for the radio broadcast industry. The name dates back to 'Clyde Electronics' who manufactured a series of analog mixers known as Alpha, Beta, Prima and Presenter.

In 1997 Clyde Broadcast Products Limited was formed as a UK-based radio studio equipment manufacturer. Clyde Broadcast also designed and installed radio broadcast and production facilities for the education sector under the name Synergy School Radio.

The brand 'Clyde Broadcast' and 'Synergy School Radio' were purchased by Clyde Broadcast technology Ltd in September 2018 as part of the sale of intellectual property and fixed assets of Clyde Broadcast Products Ltd by Keith V Anderson of MLM Solutions.
