= Westfield, Cumbernauld =

Suburb of Cumbernauld, North Lanarkshire, Scotland

Coordinates: 55°56′12″N 4°02′30″W

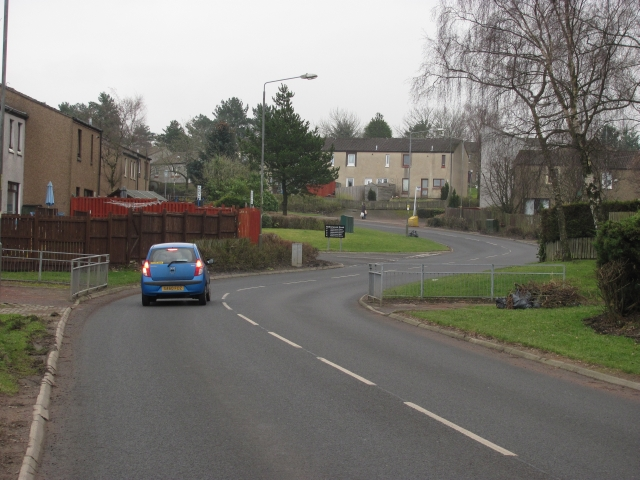
Westfield Drive

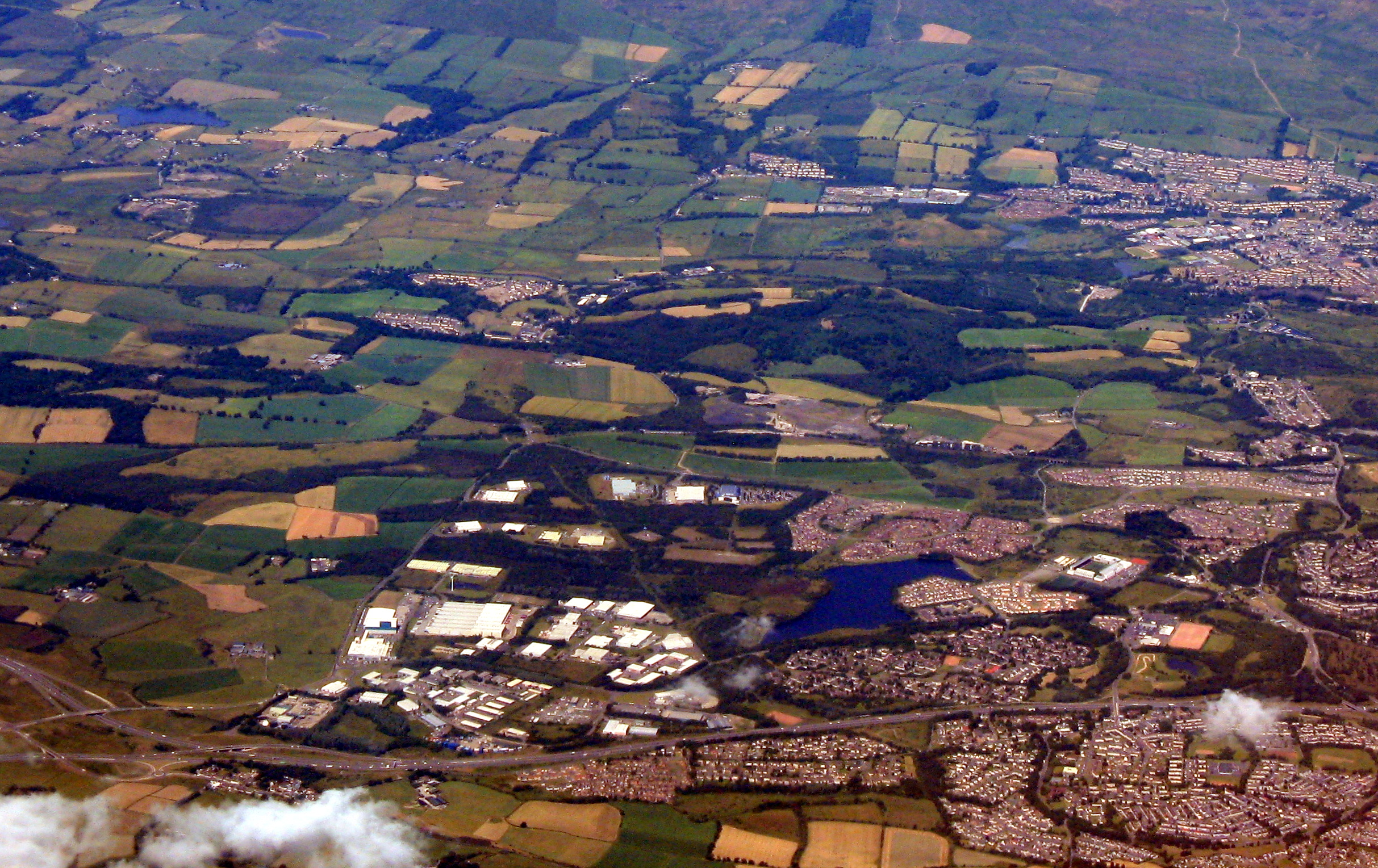
Westfield from the air

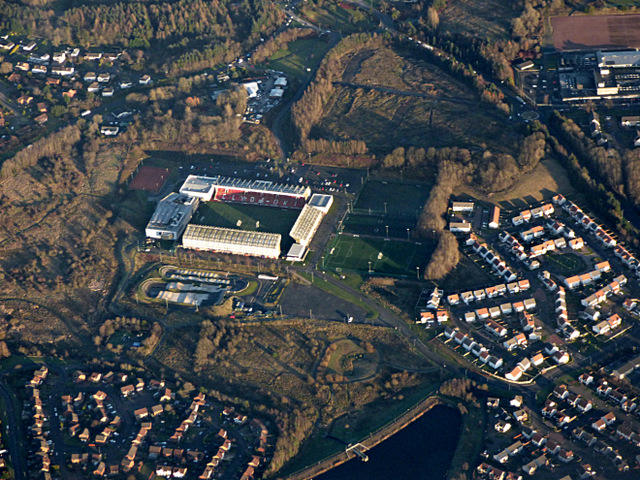
Westfield including Broadwood Stadium with Broadwood Loch at the bottom between Blackwood on the left and Collingwood on the right. Smithstone is at the top left. Top right is part of St. Maurice's High School and its playing field. Below that in the green circular area in the centre of the houses is the site of the original Westfield Farm.

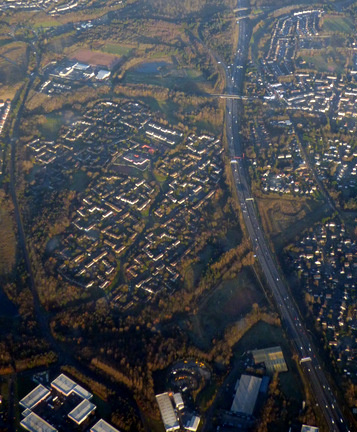
residential Westfield between the industrial estate and Balloch

Westfield is an area of the town of Cumbernauld in Scotland. Westfield is a popular residential area originally built by Cumbernauld Development Corporation in the late 1970s and early 1980s (construction began 1975). It comprises a residential area and a large industrial estate. Historically there was a farm at Westfield as shown on Roy's map of the Lowlands and the 1st 25 inch Ordnance Survey Map of Scotland. It is located near Condorrat and Broadwood Stadium, home of Clyde FC. Historically, there were two local primary schools, St Francis of Assisi Primary School and Westfield Primary School. St. Francis of Assisi Primary School closed in 2009. The site has been re-developed by North Lanarkshire Council with new, high quality social housing available to rent. The new street is named Netherinch Way. Westfield also has other modern, private developments for example a new Bellway Housing development sits near Broadwood stadium along with a neighboring housing development. Westfield has a selection of frequent bus services to Airdrie, Cumbernauld Town Centre, Glasgow, Kilsyth and Kirkintilloch with buses operated by David Allan Coaches, First Group & McGills. In 2017 plans for a new retail park near Broadwood Stadium were approved.

== Westfield Road and Industrial Estates ==
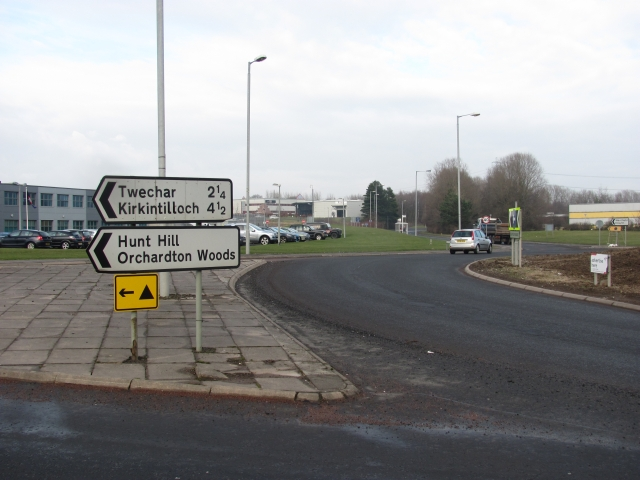
Deerdykes Roundabout

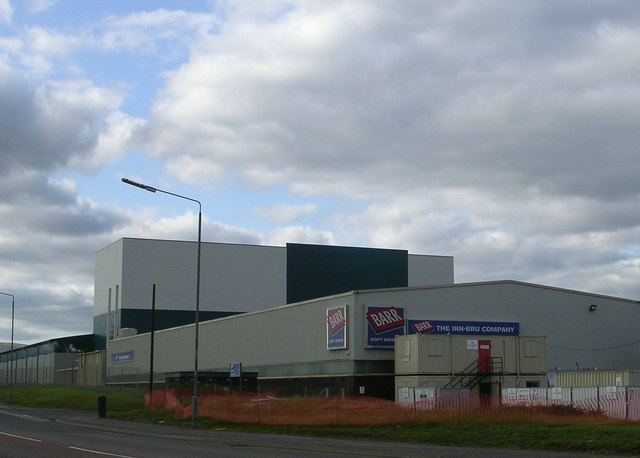
Barr's Irn-Bru Factory from 2006

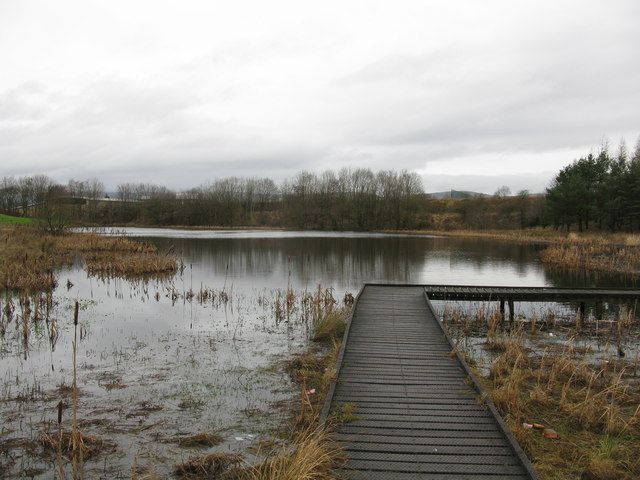
St. Maurice's Pond

Westfield Road runs from the Craiglinn Roundabout near Broadwood Farm to Deerdykes Roundabout on Mollins Road which is at the border between North Lanarkshire and East Dumbartonshire. South of Westfield Road are St. Maurice's High School, St Maurice's Pond, the residential area around Westfield Drive and the industrial area around Deerdykes Road. North of Westfield Road are Broadwood and Collingwood with the residential area around Smithstone and Blackwood north of them. West of the residential areas are industrial areas around Orchardton Road, Drum Mains Park, Little Drum Road and Hunt Hill. Barr's Irn-Bru may be the best known product from this area of Cumbernauld.

Westfield is located with good access to the M80 and M73, which provides links to Glasgow, Falkirk, Stirling and Edinburgh.
