= Rubicon Drinks =

UK soft drink manufacturer

- Type: Subsidiary
- Founded: 1982; 44 years ago London, United Kingdom
- Founders: Naresh Nagrecha and Vishram Vekaria
- Headquarters: Milton Keynes, United Kingdom
- Products: List: Rubicon Mango Rubicon Passionfruit Rubicon Raspberry & Pineapple Rubicon Pomegranate Rubicon Guava Rubicon Lychee Rubicon Guanabana Rubicon Pineapple & Coconut Rubicon 100% Organic Coconut Water Rubicon Raw Energy
- Owner: A.G. Barr
- Website: rubicondrinks.com

Rubicon Drinks Limited is a British beverage producer and brand of exotic fruit-based soft drinks, based in Milton Keynes. It is a subsidiary of the Scottish beverage company A.G. Barr. While primarily specialising in juice drinks, in recent years Rubicon have also launched fruit-based water and energy drink products.

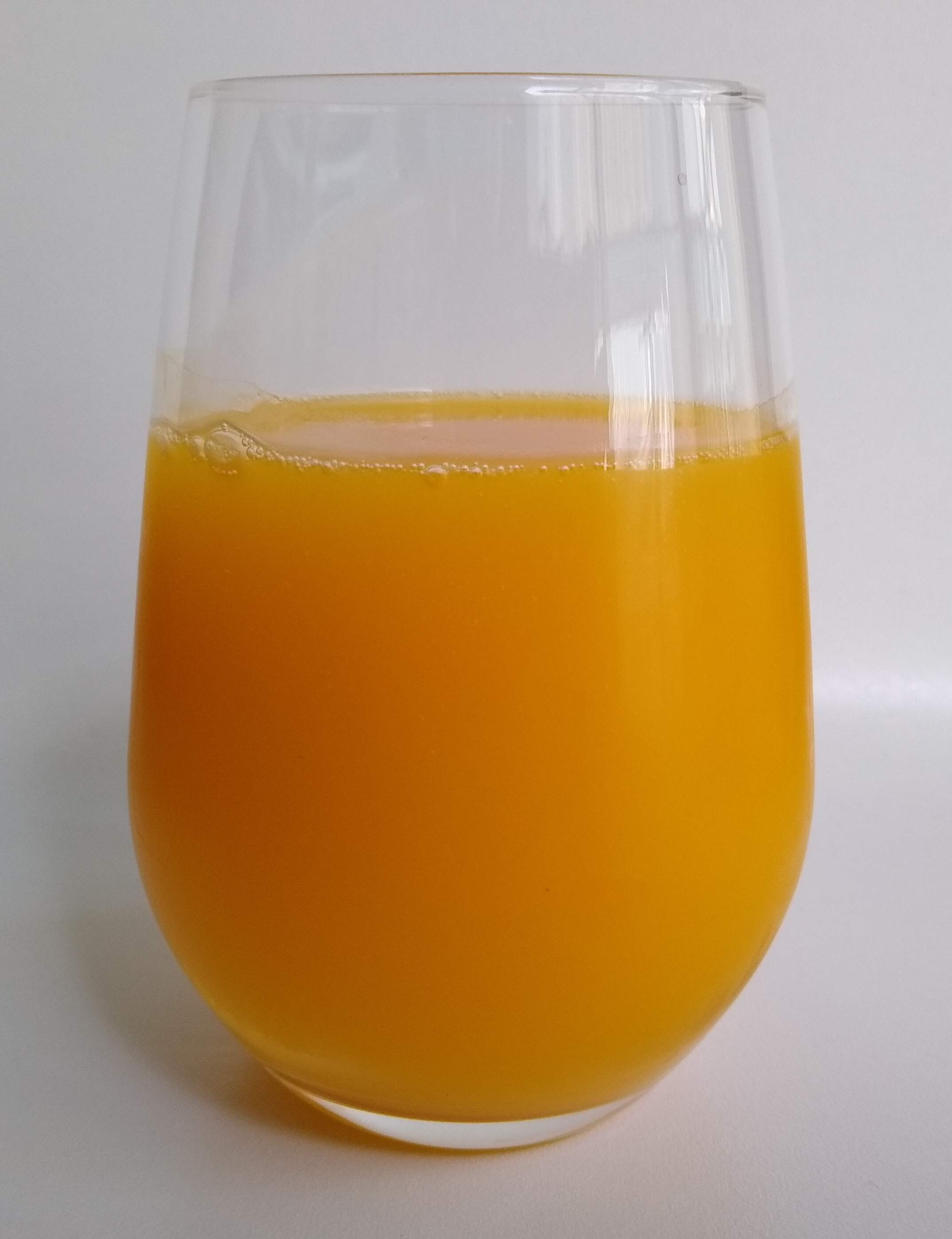
Rubicon mango juice drink

== History ==
The company was founded in 1982 by Asian immigrants Naresh Nagrecha and Vishram Vekaria, with the aim of providing exotic fruit juice drinks for the ethnic community in Britain.

A.G. Barr acquired Rubicon Drinks Ltd in August 2008, and it has since formed one of A.G. Barr's "core" soft drink brands, alongside Irn-Bru and Boost. As of 2011, Rubicon's head office was in Wembley and its factory in Tredegar.

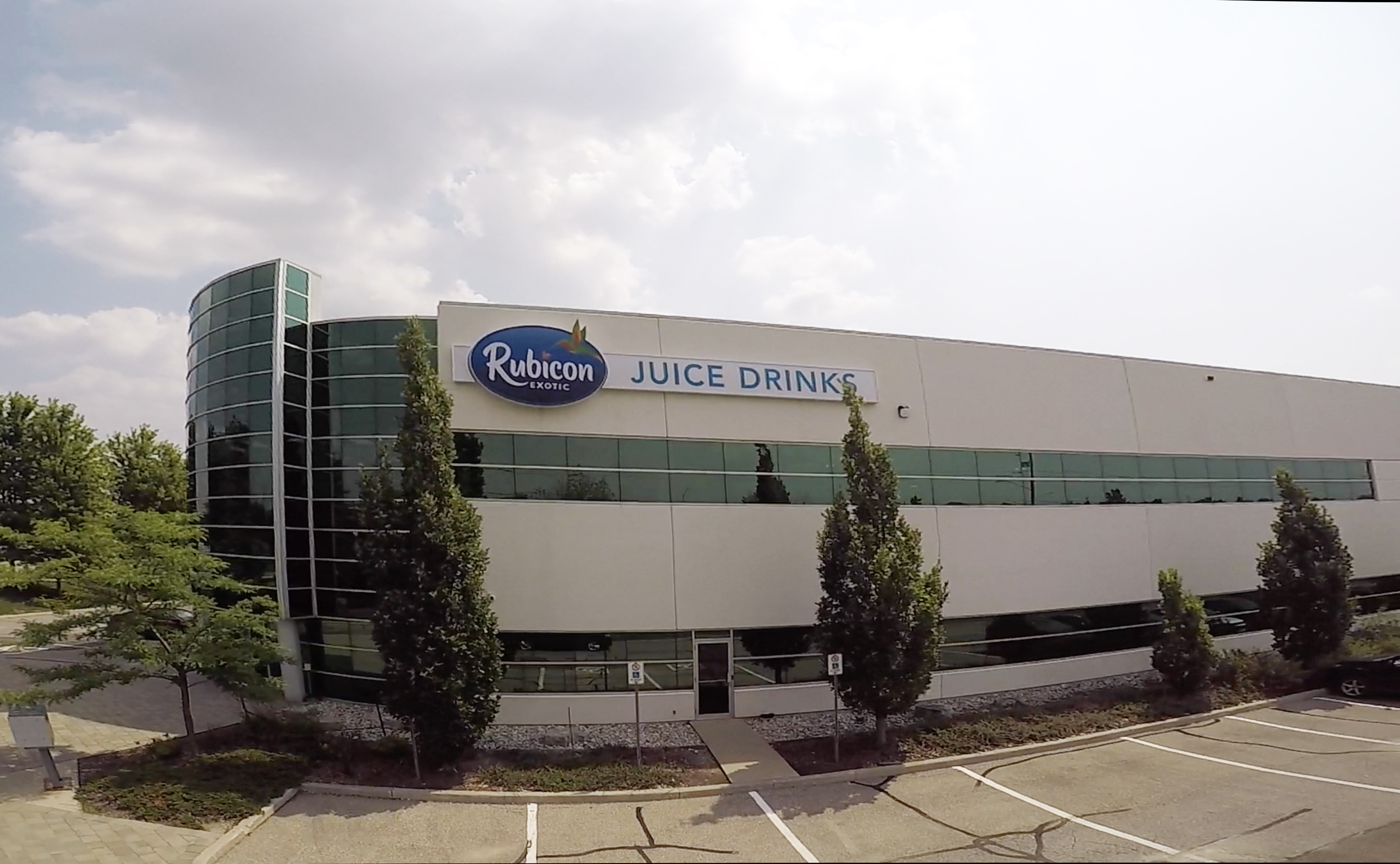
Headquarters of Rubicon Food Products Ltd in Richmond Hill, Canada

Rubicon is wholly owned worldwide, excluding the UK & Europe, by its original co-founders, the late Naresh Nagrecha and his wife, Veena Nagrecha. Rubicon’s international operations are overseen by Neel Nagrecha and Anjalee Nagrecha, with operational headquarters in Canada and the United Arab Emirates. Rubicon products are manufactured by Rubicon Food Products Limited, based in Richmond Hill, Ontario, under a licensing arrangement. Ownership of the Rubicon brand, including its intellectual property and rights outside the UK & Europe, rests with Lanara Ltd, a company controlled by the Nagrecha family.

== Sponsorship ==
In 2007, Rubicon was the sponsor of the Urban Music Awards. Rubicon has also sponsored Sky Sports' coverage of the ICC Cricket World Cup and World Twenty20 Championship in 2010 and 2011, with the catchphrase "Time for a Rubicon break" often heard before adverts.
