= Tizer =

British citrus-flavoured soft drink

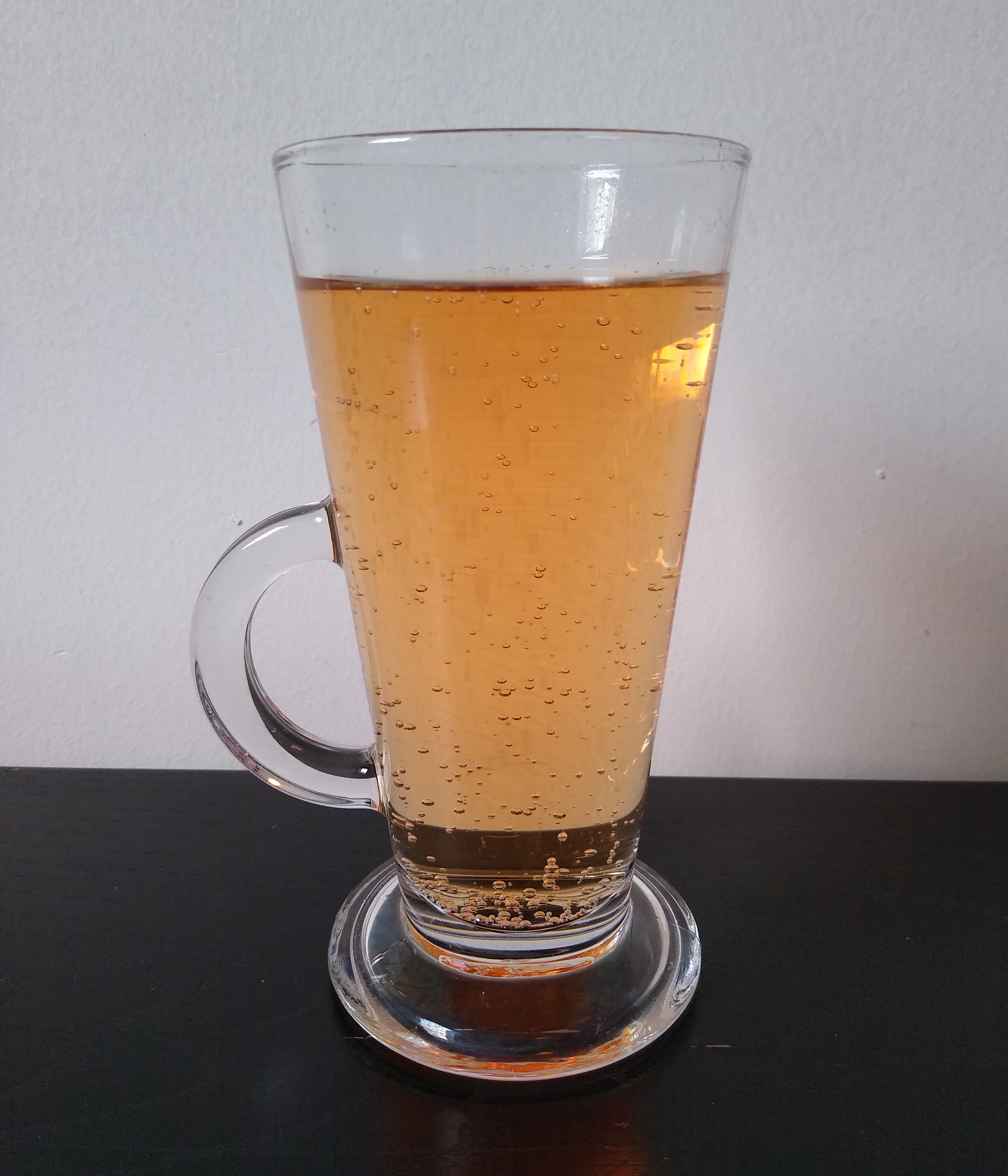
- A glass of Tizer
- Type: Carbonated soft drink
- Manufacturer: A.G. Barr (since 1972)
- Origin: United Kingdom
- Introduced: 1924
- Colour: Orange

Tizer is an orange-coloured, citrus-flavoured carbonated soft drink bottled and sold in the UK. It was launched in 1924 by Fred and Tom Pickup when it was known as "Pickup's Appetizer", later abbreviated to Tizer. The original Tizer company would produce a range of other soft drinks including Jusoda. The drink has been manufactured by A.G. Barr since 1972.

== History ==
=== Early history ===
Thomas Pickup was born on 21 July 1884 in Ashworth, Lancashire, while his brother Fred was born in 1879 in Heap, Birtle, Lancashire to parents Edmund Pickup and Eliza Saxon. Edmund's brother, Abraham, was by 1901 in partnership with Thomas Fentiman as Fentiman & Pickup, botanical brewers based in Middlesbrough. The partnership dissolved in 1903, when Fentiman retired; Abraham continued the business until his death in 1906, at which time his widow Harriet continued the business. By 1907, Thomas and Fred, along with their sister and mother had setup Pickup & Co, as botanical brewers in Bristol, and by 1910 had opened a branch in Pontypridd. A year later Fred had moved to Leeds, setting up F Pickup, but in 1919, Fred, Hannah and Eliza had left Pickup & Co leaving Thomas to run the company alone.

The brothers expanded into Manchester, and in 1924 created a new soft drink, that they called Pickups Appetizer, which Fred use to deliver in the streets of the city in stone bottles. In 1931, a new company, Radiant Table Waters, were formed by the Pickups in Bristol to expand the business with a home delivery service, while in 1933 Tizer Co. Ltd was set up to expand the business into London. In 1936, Tizer Ltd was incorporated as a public company to take over the operations of F. Pickup, Pickup & Co, Tizer Co. Ltd and Radiant Table Waters.

=== After World War II ===
In 1956, Pickup announced that the company had made a profit of £270,209 in 1955 and that it had purchased the company, Our Boys Mineral Water based in South Wales. However, a year later profits had fallen to £68,818 after sales were affected by bad weather that summer. The company introduced a new drink, Jusoda, which with continued improved sales in Tizer, had seen the company's profits grow to £254,196 in 1957. Thomas Pickup died in 1960, while Fred Pickup stood down as chairman in 1962, but remained on the board until his death in 1968. In 1960, profits after tax stood at £263,403, but as the table below shows, after a climb in profits, these had decreased by the end of the decade:

Year	Net profit after tax (£)
1961	316,190
1962	261,191
1963	304,599
1964	320,825
1965	303,621
1966	272,339
1967	203,561
1968	133,335
1969	29,986

Tizer's chairman, F. Hindle, stated in his 1970 statement that sales had been hit by the increasing market push by the American cola companies, and as such they had agreed a licence to produce Royal Crown Cola in the UK.

To stem the losses, the company recruited a Peter Quinn, a general manager at Polyfoil Ltd, an subsidiary of Alcan, as chief executive. He noted upon his arrival in February 1970, the outdated machinery, poor marketing, un-trained managers and the localised organisation of what was by then a national business with 4% of the soft drinks market. Quinn started a reorganisation of the company's operations, including bringing in new managers and closing loss making or smaller depots, and introducing a new national marketing campaign developed by Conran Design. Another first was producing Tizer in ring-pull cans instead of the returnable bottles. Quinn believed that the company could grow sales by 20% per annum with the changes.

=== New ownership ===
The company's transformation had seen sales grow to £3.551m in 1971, up from £2.949m in 1969, but there was a trading loss of £111,111. However in December 1971, Armour Trust, a British investment organisation, who were involved in consumer finance, property and advertising, purchased the company for £2.3m, with major shareholders such as Slater Walker accepting the offer. Armour quickly reversed many of Quinn's changes by reverting back to local management, selling off property and closing depots to try and stem the losses. Peter Quinn resigned from the company and was replaced by Michael Thomas.

However, Armour Trust only owned the company for a year and one day, and sold the business to Scottish drinks company A.G. Barr plc for £2.5m ($5.8 million) in December 1972. This saw the company return to family ownership, as Fred and Thomas Pickup were nephews to William Snodgrass Barr, the grandfather of the current chairman. In 1973, after 6 months of development, Barr's chemists introduced a new recipe trying to re-create the original formula as close as possible.

In 2007, Tizer was re-branded with the slogan "Original Great Taste" and a classic recipe with fewer additives and no E numbers. It was also given classic 1976 style packaging. However, despite the relaunch's focus of the addition of real fruit juice and the absence of artificial flavourings, colourings and sweeteners, in 2009 the recipe was returned to the original to remove the real fruit juice and reintroduce artificial flavourings, artificial colours and sweeteners (Acesulfame-K). Tizer was rebranded in 2011 with a new logo and the slogan "The Great British Pop".

== Tizer variations ==
=== Tizer Ice ===
Tizer Ice was launched in the late 1990s. The drink included menthol, giving it the sensation of tasting cold, even at room temperature. Whilst known as Tizer Ice, the mascot of the drink was a variation of Ed the Tizer Head. Its sole video advertisement which was shown in cinemas featured a character known as the "Iceman".

A 1999 print advertisement which showed children with their faces pressed against a glass surface with the slogan "How many kids can you get in your fridge?" was criticised as "inappropriate" by the Royal Society for the Prevention of Accidents, which had recorded deaths of children trapped inside refrigerators. The drink was re-branded as Ice by Tizer' but poor sales saw the drink discontinued.

=== Tizer Diet ===
Tizer Diet was a short-lived low-calorie alternative to Tizer, originally sold in the late 1980s when known as Sugar Free Tizer, and again from 1997 to 2001 as Tizer Diet. Its 2001 advertising campaign included a bus shelter advertisement in the form of a funhouse mirror bearing the Tizer Diet logo, designed to make the viewer appear thinner.

=== Other Tizer variants ===
Barr launched several other flavour variants. In 2003, Purple and Green versions of the drink were launched, while a year later Tizer Fruitz was launched.

== Other non-Tizer products ==
- Jusoda Orange Crush
- Jusoda Lemon-Lime Crush
- Lemonade
- Nectose (a concentrated cordial)
- Quencher (four flavours of still drinks in cartons)
- Radiant Table Water Ginger Beer
- Radiant Table Water Lemonade
- Radiant Table Water Mineral Water
- Royal Crown Cola (under licence)

== Branding and packaging ==
=== "Ize" campaign ===
In 1985, Tizer initiated a television campaign on TV-am exploring the "Tize-izer" vocabulary, depicting scenarios in which characters place "ize" between the syllables of words. A free, promotional flexidisc, featuring the voice of Spitting Image impressionist Rory Bremner, was produced as part of the campaign. The Evening Despatch described Bremner as "doing the most to help people master the new language." The tongue twister-based language grew in popularity among children who, according to Isle of Wight County Press, would use the patois "to the complete bewilderment of mums and dads".

=== Fan club ===
A Tizer fan club for United Kingdom based consumers was launched in July 1991. The fan club was advertised in teenage magazines such as Smash Hits and cost £3.00 to join. In return the fan club member received a membership card and Tizer merchandise including a folder, stickers and Tizer branded wraparound sunglasses. The fan club was discontinued around 1993.

=== ---tizer campaign ===
In April 1993, Tizer launched a £2.5 million television and cinema campaign, created by the agency BDH and Partners, which aimed the product at the 16–24 age group, rather than younger children. The novel campaign, which aimed for cult status and credibility, began with eight quirky television advertisements that the Manchester Evening News described as "completely off the wall". The word "Tizer" was never mentioned on air; instead, each commercial utilised a play-on-words, using parts of words that have "-tizer" as a suffix, such as "Bap-", "Adver-" and "Hypno-". As the prefix is left on screen, the viewer is left to add the missing word "Tizer" to decipher the theme. Each advert featured surreal representations and demonstrations of their respective classifications, such as raving young people and bottle jugglers; the actors – which BDH hired after scouting nightclubs in Manchester and London – appear in black-and-white against the bubbling red Tizer backdrop. BDH marketing manager believed that this "brave advertising approach" would help Tizer stand out against rivals like Tango, Lilt, Coca-Cola, Pepsi and fellow Barr product Irn-Bru.

The advertisements proved popular enough that BDH created a further seven, "even more anarchic" advertisements, debuting in May 1994 and running throughout the summer, in a £2 million extension of the campaign. New prefixes included "stigma-", "priva-" and "dogma-", with the unusual characters and scenarios used to express each term ranging from a beauty queen sipping a can of Tizer and conceding that she's "in it for the money", an obnoxious parrot who gives out parental orders, a "veggie militant", and a bulldog informing a crowd of dogs that "poop existed before pavements."

=== In store and incentives ===
Tizer was sold at the discontinued pizza restaurant chain, Pizzaland. In 1995, cans of Tizer offered that the specific can was "worth £1 at Pizzaland" when £4 or more was spent.

=== Refresh your head ===
In 1996, Tizer was rebranded, and the cans and bottles were redesigned to feature a new logo and a head mascot. The cans were changed from red to blue, and the old motto "The appetizer" was replaced by "Refresh your head". The changes by Pilot Design of Leeds were to appeal to the 5 to 15-year-olds core market, who thought the previous packaging was old fashioned. DJ Chris Evans fronted a £2 million TV advertising campaign to relaunch the new design.

=== Sponsorship ===
In 1997, Tizer took over the sponsorship of The Chart Show which was a Saturday morning music chart show on the ITV network in the UK.

From 23 January 1999, Tizer was the sponsor of the newly rebranded CD:UK which was the replacement for The Chart Show back in 1998.

Tizer sponsored a roller coaster in Southport called the "Traumatizer" from 1999. The ride was closed in 2006 and relocated to Blackpool Pleasure Beach, where it became known as "Infusion".

=== Lunchboxes ===
A campaign for Tizer from 2001 saw the brand package four bottles of the drink in blue lunchboxes. This was inspired by the Tango lunchbox in 2000.

=== Itz a red thing ===
In 2003, a rebranding by Barr saw the company changed back to red packaging, axing its Refresh your head strapline in favour of Itz a red thing. The rebrand, which cost £1.5 million, included TV adverts featuring animation by Pete Candeland, but saw the product end its sponsorship of the Saturday morning TV show CD:UK as part of its plan to reposition the drink in the marketplace.

=== Chameleon ===
In 2004, Tizer aired a campaign depicting a red chameleon remaining the same colour despite a number of different coloured backgrounds—the campaign's slogan was "No, we're not changing colour."

=== Slogans ===
- "You Can Tell It's Tizer When Your Eyes Are Shut" (1980, 1982)
- "I'se Got The Ize" (1986)
- "Refresh Your Head" (1996–2003)
- "!tz a Red Thing" (2003–2007)
- "Live the Red Life" (2005)
- "The Great British Pop" (2011–present)

== Musical references ==
The 1974 song "Back in Judy's Jungle" by Brian Eno mentions the soft drink, as does the 1983 song "Party, Party" by Elvis Costello, the 1991 song "King Leer" by Morrissey and in the Deacon Blue track Fellow Hoodlums.

== Gallery ==
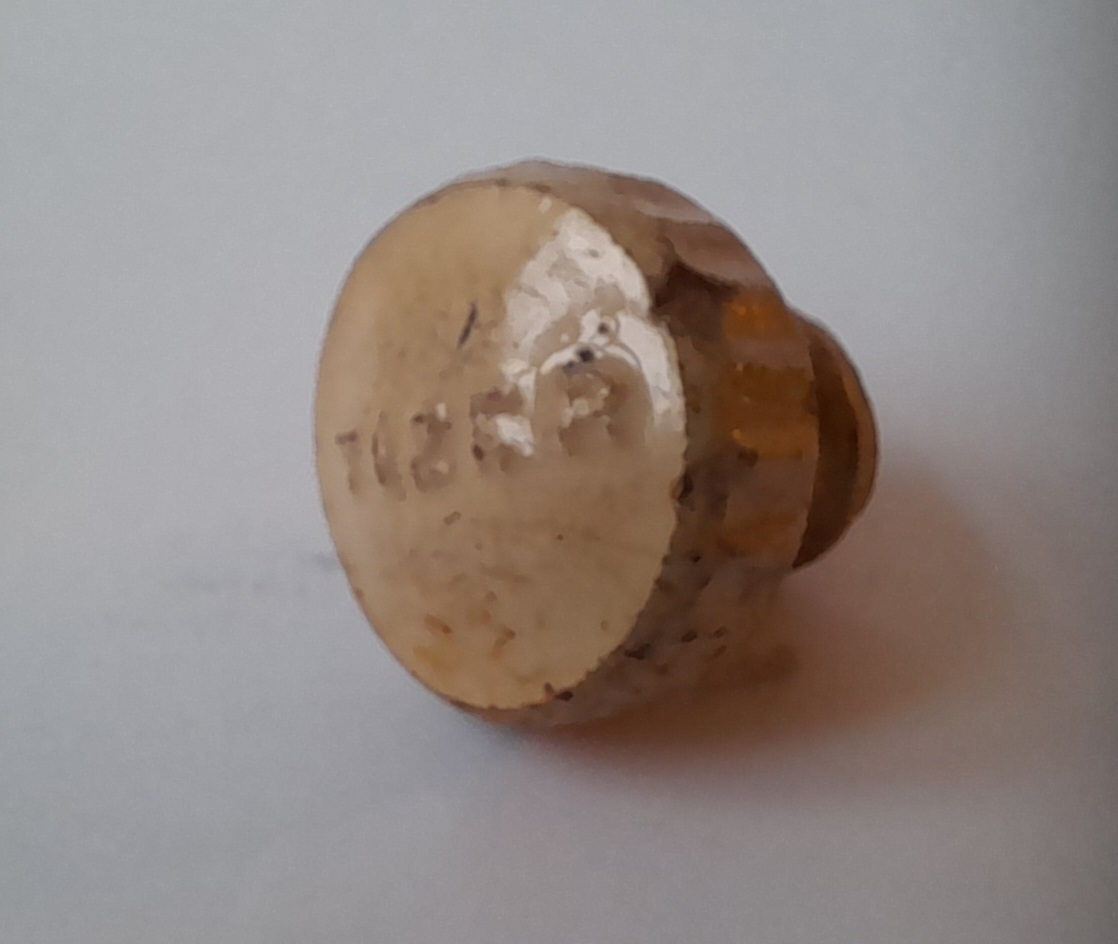
Ceramic bottle stopper embossed 'TIZER', circa 1920s

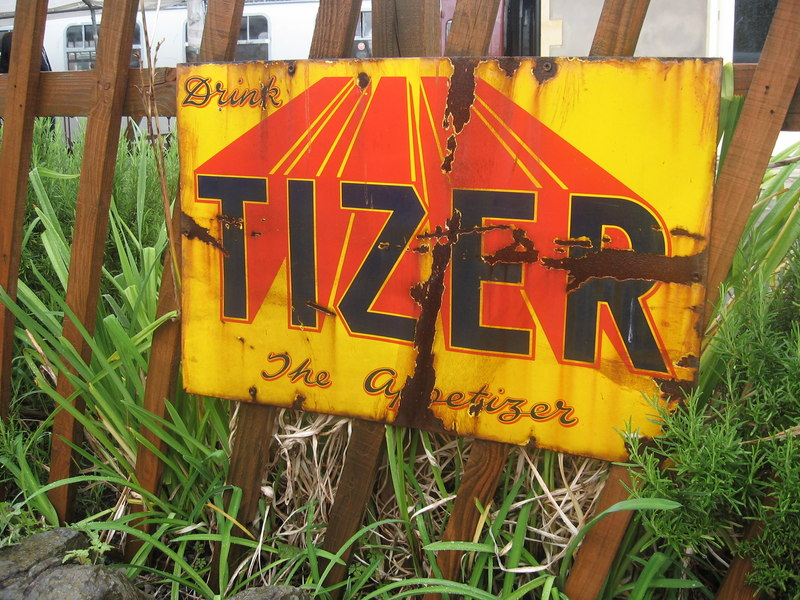
Old Tizer advert
