= Red Kola =

Carbonated soft drink

- Type: Soft drink
- Manufacturer: A.G. Barr, Currie's
- Distributor: Dunns Food & Drinks Ltd.
- Origin: Scotland
- Colour: Black carrot, safflower (Barr's) anthocyanin, turmeric (Currie's)
- Related products: Irn-Bru, Tizer, Coca-Cola
- Website: dunnsfoodanddrinks.co.uk/our-range/own-brands/curries-red-kola-3

Red Kola is a carbonated soft drink made from fruit extracts, and may include flavouring from the kola nut. Red Kola is made by various firms including Currie's (operated by Dunns Food & Drinks Ltd) and A.G. Barr.

Despite the name, it bears no resemblance to more traditional cola drinks in either flavour or appearance. It is bright red in colour and has a unique taste, significantly sharper than cola and with a strong fruit base.

== Ingredients ==
Currie's Red Kola: carbonated water, sugar, tartaric acid, flavourings, preservative (sodium benzoate), sweeteners (sodium saccharin, aspartame), colours (E163, E100).

Barr Red Kola: carbonated water, sugar, citric acid, flavouring, concentrates (black carrot, safflower), sweeteners (sucralose, acesulfame K), preservative (sodium benzoate).
