= Red soda =

Red soda may refer to:

- Big Red (drink), a red soda
- Red Kola, a red colored soda with flavoring from the Kola Nut
- Fruti Cola, a red soda from Cawy Bottling Company
