= The Poets =

Scottish band

- Origin: Glasgow, Scotland
- Genres: Blues, freakbeat, psychedelic pop
- Years active: Late 1962–late 1960s, 2011–2012
- Labels: Decca, Immediate
- Past members: Members

The Poets were a Scottish blues, freakbeat and psychedelic pop band, who were managed and produced by Andrew Loog Oldham. Some of their singles were released on his label, Immediate Records. Their cover version of "Baby Don't You Do It" was produced by Immediate in-house record producer, Paul Raven (Gary Glitter).

Musically, the band's style contained elements of both the hard R&B of the early Small Faces (both bands would cover "Baby Don't You Do It") and the Action along with the more melodic sounds of the Kinks, the Searchers and the later period Small Faces. Visually, they sported an Edwardian look similar to the early Kinks with matching velvet jackets, ruffled shirts, tight pants, Beatle Boots and shag haircuts. Within the West of Scotland however, their look was interpreted as based on the poet Robert Burns' appearance in paintings of his time.

Their 1964 single "Now We're Thru'" was a No. 31 hit on the UK Singles Chart. However, later singles were not chart successes outside Scotland, and no full album was completed.

Some of their singles appear on various compilation albums, including the Nuggets II box set on Rhino Records (one song) and The Immediate Records Story (four songs) on Charly Records. One of their tracks, "That's the Way It's Got to Be" was on the soundtrack for the films Factory Girl and Frankenstein Meets the Space Monster.

Their former member, Hume Paton, born Hume Michael Paton, 6 October 1945, Bellshill, Glasgow, died on 30 April 2011, from a heart attack in Saint Georges, Grenada, West Indies at the age of 65. Another former member, Alan Weir, born 12 September 1943, Gartcosh, Lanarkshire died on 9 June 2010 from cancer in Cambridge, at the age of 67. Another former member John Dawson, born 6 May 1944, Glasgow, Strathclyde died on 6 January 2002 in Glasgow of cancer, at the age of 57.

In 2011, the Poets reformed with original members George Gallacher and Fraser Watson, and on 2 December that year, played at the Eyes Wide Open club's 7th anniversary celebration. This was meant to be a one off, but just before the gig, the Poets' name appeared in the line-up to Le Beat Bespoke 8, listing them as playing on 8 April 2012.

Lead singer George Gallacher born 21 October 1943, Royston, Glasgow, died of a heart attack on 25 August 2012, at Glasgow Royal Infirmary at age 68 while travelling home after watching his beloved Partick Thistle win 3–0 against Dumbarton. The remaining founder member, Tony Myles, now lives in Spain where he hosts various radio programs and continues to write music at his home studio in the Costa Blanca.

== Discography ==
=== Singles ===
- "Now We're Thru" (Gallacher/Paton/Myles)/ "There Are Some" (Gallacher/Paton/Myles) (October 1964), Decca - UK No. 31
- "That's the Way It's Got to Be" (Gallacher/Paton/Myles)/ "I'll Cry with the Moon" (Gallacher/Paton/Myles) (February 1965), Decca
- "I Am So Blue" (Paton/Gallacher/Myles) / "I Love Her Still" (Gallacher/Paton/Myles) (July 1965), Decca
- "Call Again" (Paton/Gallacher) / "Some Things I Can't Forget" (Paton/Gallacher) (October 1965), Immediate
- "Baby Don't You Do It" (Holland/Dozier) / "I'll Come Home" (Gallacher/Paton) (January 1966), Immediate
- "Wooden Spoon" (Moeller, Woolfson)/ "In Your Tower" (Mulvey, Watson) (February 1967), Decca
- "Heyla Hola" (Meehan and Henderson) / "Fun Buggy" (Henderson) (Strike Cola promotional single, c. 1970/71)

== Members ==
- George Gallacher - lead vocals (born 21 September 1943, died 25 August 2012)
- John Dawson - bass guitar (born 6 May 1944, died 6 January 2002)
- Alan Weir - drums (born 12 September 1943, died 9 June 2010)
- Stafford Hamilton - rhythm guitar (born 1945, died 2011)
- Hume Paton - 12-string lead guitar (born Hume Michael Paton, 6 October 1945, died 30 April 2011)
- Tony Myles - rhythm guitar (born 11 January 1943, Douglas, Isle of Man)
- Jim Breakey - drums (born 4 January 1947, Glasgow, Scotland)
- Fraser Watson - rhythm guitar, later lead guitar
- Andi Mulvey - lead vocals
- Norrie McLean - bass
- Ian McMillan - rhythm guitar
- Stuart McKenzie - drums
- Ray Duffy - drums (two weeks)
- Hughie Nicholson - drums
- Johnny Martin - bass
- Dougie Henderson - drums
- Hugh Burns - guitar
- Charlie Smith - drums
- Joe Breen - bass
