= Ship and Shovell =

Pub in Charing Cross, London

The Ship and Shovell
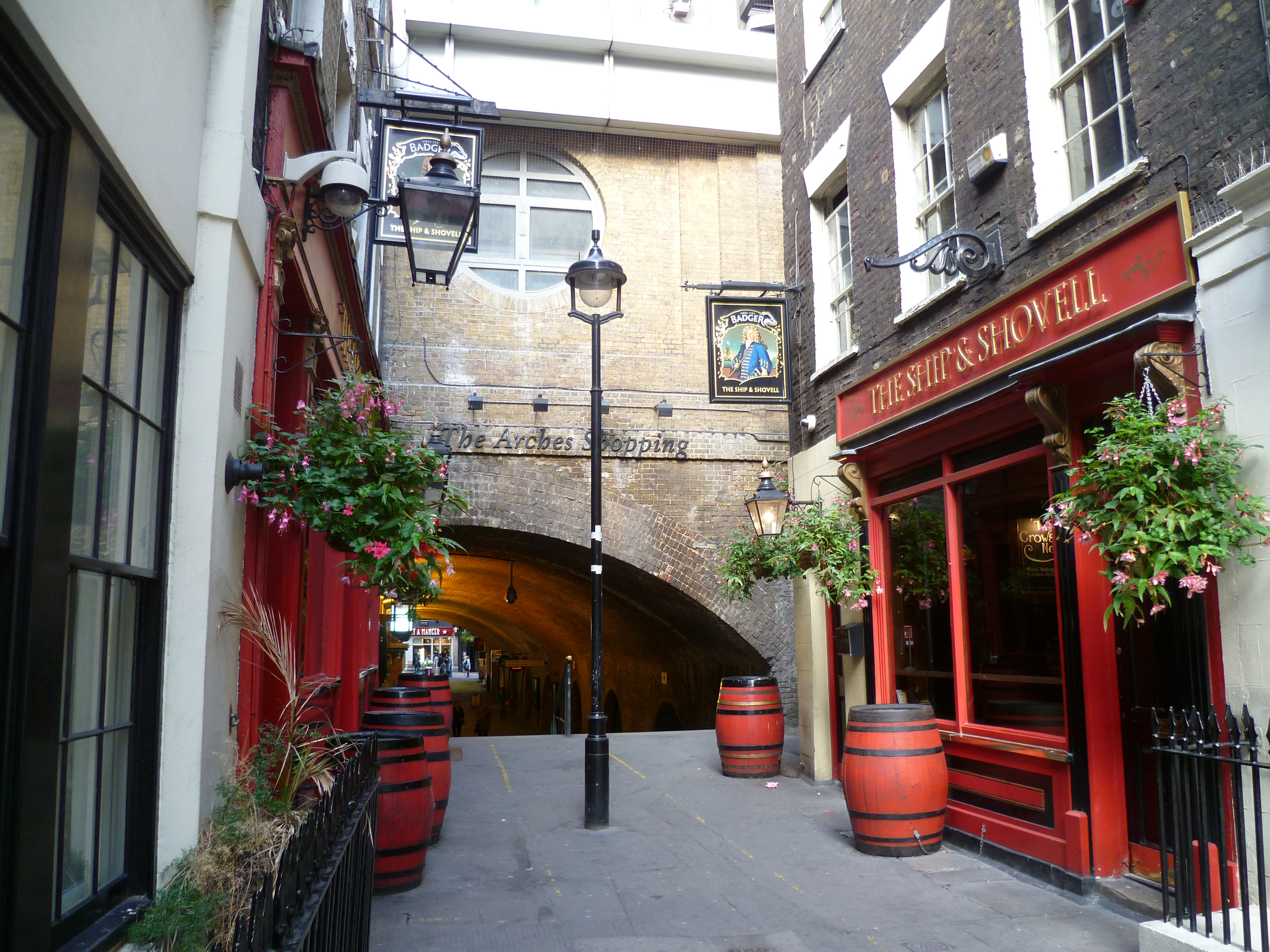
- The Ship and Shovell
- Interactive map of The Ship and Shovell
- 51°30′27.72″N 0°7′29.28″W
- Type: Public house
- Location: 2 AND 3, Craven Passage, Charing Cross, London WC2

Listed Building – Grade II
- Official name: SHIP AND SHOVEL PUBLIC HOUSE
- Designated: 09-Jan-1970
- Reference no.: 1220801

The Ship and Shovell is a Victorian pub in Craven Passage, Charing Cross, London. It may be unique for consisting of two separate buildings on either side of a street, connected underground by a shared cellar.

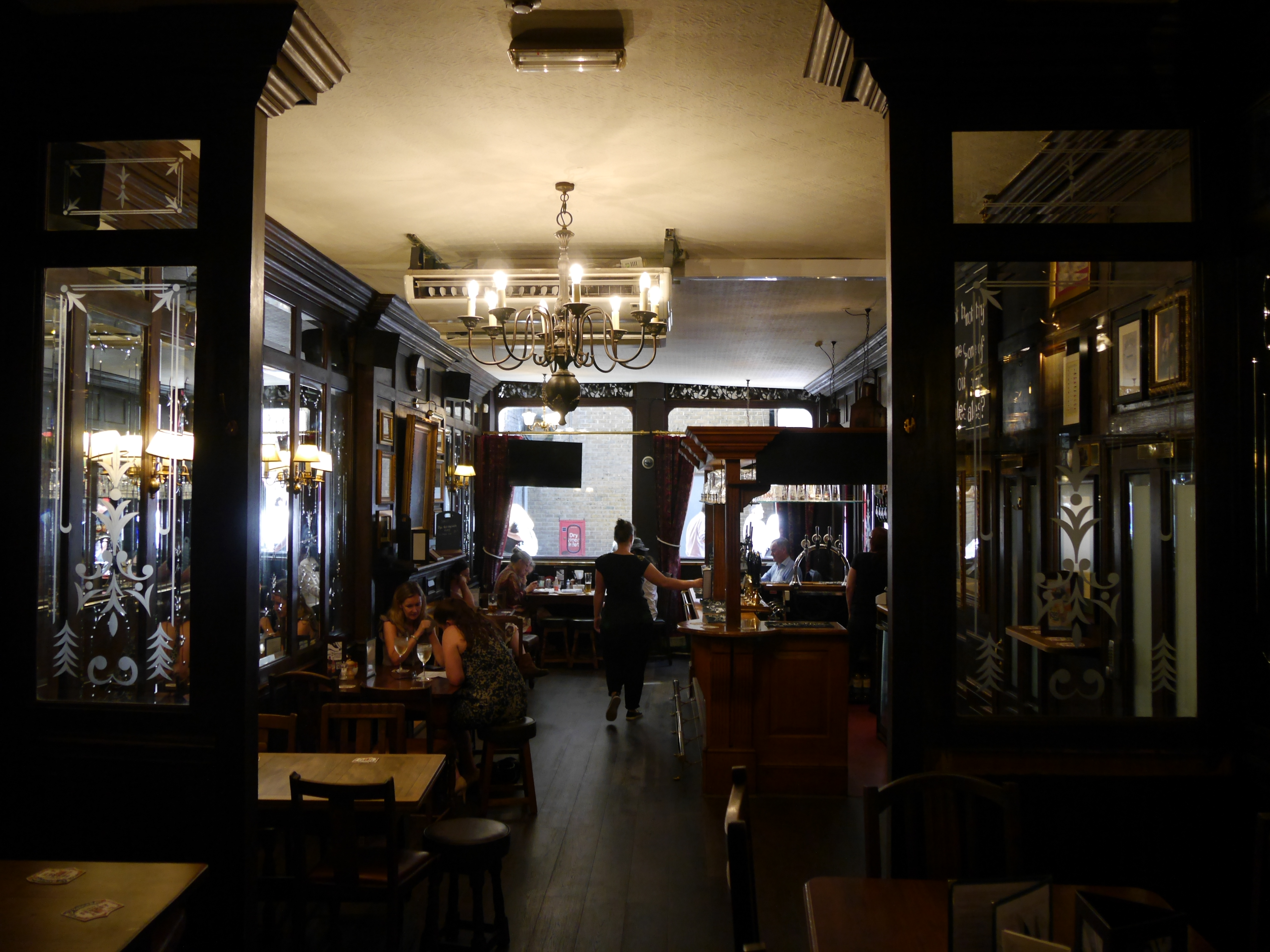
Interior, 2016

Its name has its origins in either the coal labourers who visited the nearby Coal Hole or Admiral Sir Cloudesley Shovell.

The two former terrace houses were built in 1731–33, but later refaced. It has been Grade II listed since 1970.

Until 1998 it was two separate pubs (The Shovell and The Ship) when the cellars were joined by a new tunnel under Craven Passage containing the kitchen.

It is run by the Dorset family brewers Hall and Woodhouse.
