= Roger White (executive) =

CEO of soft drinks group AG Barr

Roger White from Dumfries in Scotland is the chief executive officer of soft drinks group A G Barr.

== Biography ==
White attended Dumfries Academy and then the University of Edinburgh where he graduated in geography, having also studied economics, and business. In 2002, he joined A G Barr as managing director, and in 2004 became Barr's first non-family chief executive.

Away from the office, White is a sports fan including his support of home town football club, Queen of the South. .
