= Barr Cola =

Barr drinks

- Type: Soft drink
- Manufacturer: A.G. Barr
- Origin: Scotland
- Introduced: 1875
- Colour: Caramel
- Flavour: Cola
- Variants: Cola, Red cola, Diet cola, Xrta cola, Cream soda, Bubblegum, Lemonade, Limeade, Raspberryade, Ginger beer, Shandyade, Orangeade and Pineapple.
- Website: Barr flavors

Barr Cola is a cola made from kola nuts by the A.G. Barr company, makers of Irn-Bru. The drink was first released in 1875. It was once called Strike Cola and was popular in Britain's fish-and-chip shops and convenience stores. Nowadays, Barr is still enjoyed by many; however, it largely overshadowed by the same firm's bigger drink Irn-Bru. Barr's Cola can be purchased in 250ml bottles, 330ml cans, 500ml bottles, 750ml glass bottles and 2 litre plastic bottles. Barr’s Cola is suitable for vegans. The drink is produced in the A.G. Barr factories in Forfar, Milton Keynes and Cumbernauld. Each factory can produce up to 120,000 cans of Barr's Cola (or other Barr flavours) every minute. Barr Cola and its different flavours are sold in the supermarkets: Tesco, Sainsbury's, Asda, Morrisons and Iceland. They can also be bought in many smaller establishments throughout the UK.
