= Blandford St Mary =

Village and civil parish in Dorset, England

Coordinates: 50.849°N 2.165°W

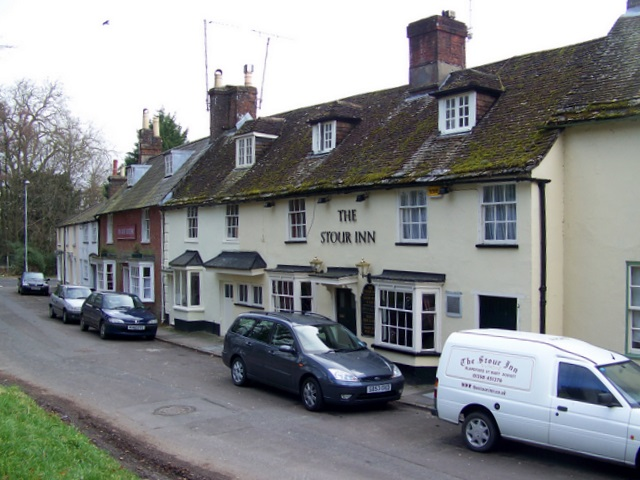
- The Stour Inn

- Location within Dorset
- Population: 1,233 (2001 Census)
- OS grid reference: ST8805
- Unitary authority: Dorset
- Ceremonial county: Dorset
- Region: South West
- Country: England
- Sovereign state: United Kingdom
- Post town: Blandford Forum
- Postcode district: DT11
- Dialling code: 01258
- Police: Dorset
- Fire: Dorset and Wiltshire
- Ambulance: South Western
- UK Parliament: North Dorset

Blandford St Mary is a village and civil parish in Dorset, England. The village is on the south bank of the River Stour, immediately opposite the larger town of Blandford Forum. The village grew up around the Badger Brewery, owned by Hall and Woodhouse, which is based there. At the 2001 census it had a population of 1,233. The appropriate electoral ward is called 'Portman' with naturally the most populous area being south of the river. The ward includes Bryanston School and also runs south west almost to Thornicombe. The total ward population at the abovementioned census was 2,436.

Blandford St Mary has a busy Tesco supermarket and fuel station, along with a The Range (retailer) store, which attracts shoppers from the many villages that surround the Blandford area. In addition there are a number of offices in Stour Park. In the residential area there is a new housing estate and primary school. An older area of the village near the river bridge to Blandford Forum has a traditional public house and a village green. Opposite is the old stone gate at the entrance of the Bryanston School estate. Outline planning permission has been given to redevelop the Hall & Woodhouse brewery site to include new offices and 200 new homes.

Lower Blandford St Mary is a rural outpost of Blandford St Mary, in the farm fields to the south across the bypass road, with a small church and graveyard, and one or two historic houses.

The Dorset Central Railway, which opened on 1 November 1860 from the LSWR station at Wimborne, had a station in the village, serving the neighbouring important market town of Blandford Forum. This was demolished when the line amalgamated to be part of the Somerset & Dorset Railway, and a bridge was built over the river Stour to the station at Blandford.

The Pitt family have links to the village. The Rev. John Pitt (1610–1672) served as Rector of Blandford St Mary, from 1645 until his death in 1672. Thomas Pitt (1653–1726), the East India Company administrator and grandfather of Prime Minister William Pitt, 1st Earl of Chatham, restored Blandford St Mary's parish church and added a north aisle in 1711 (later replaced in 1862). A mural monument to Rev. John Pitt remains in the church (erected by Thomas Pitt in 1712), and Thomas Pitt was buried at Blandford St Mary in May 1726 after his death.
