= Boost Drinks =

British drinks company

Boost Drinks Limited

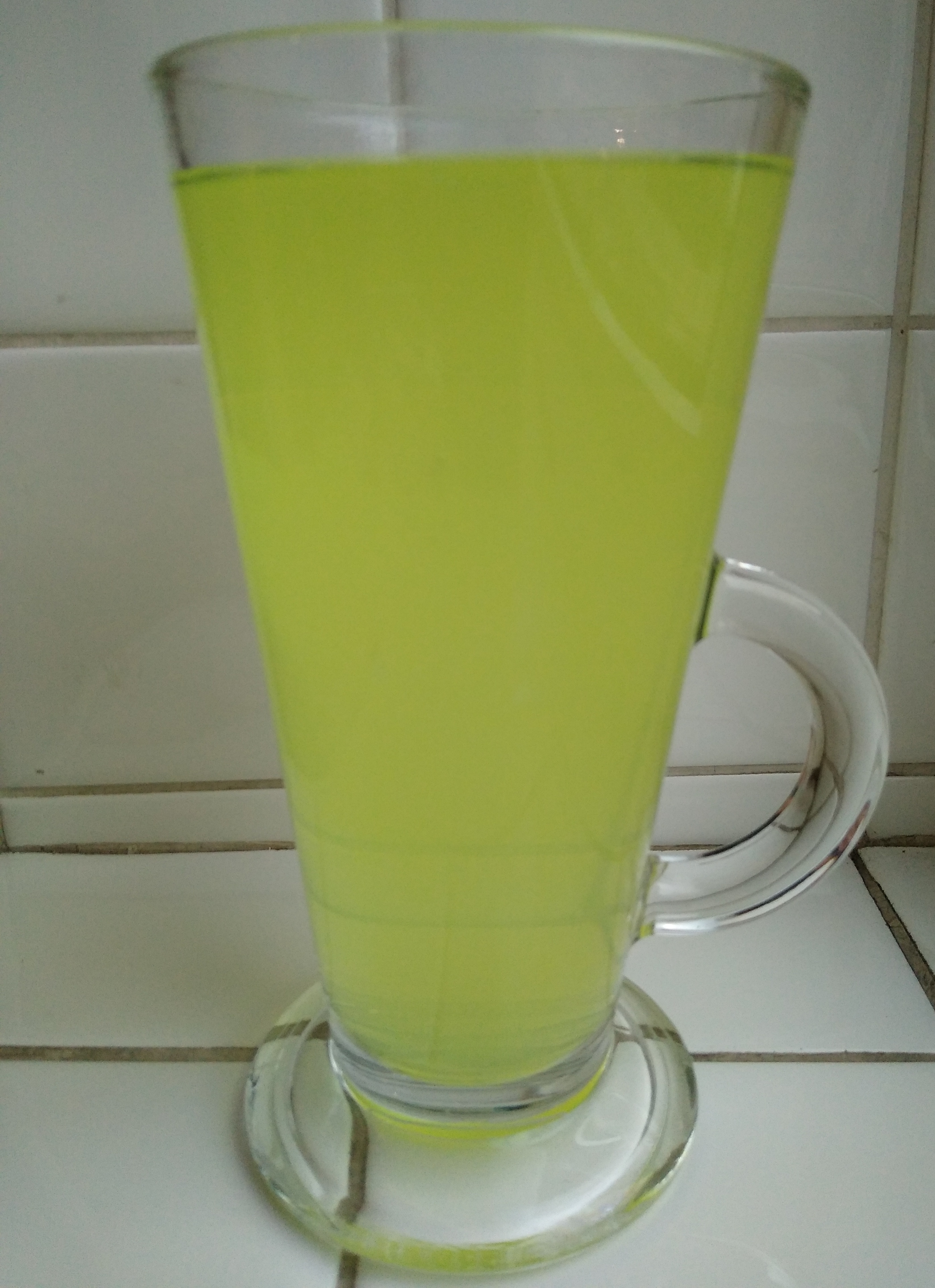
- Boost "exotic fruits" flavoured energy drink
- Formerly: Blast UK Limited (June–July 2001)
- Company type: Private
- Industry: Drinks
- Founded: June 27, 2001; 24 years ago
- Founder: Simon Gray
- Headquarters: Milton Keynes, England
- Area served: Great Britain; Northern Ireland
- Parent: Boost Drinks Holdings Limited (2021–2023); A.G. Barr P.L.C. (2023–present)
- Website: boostdrinks.com

Boost Drinks Limited is a British drinks company that sells primarily energy and sports drinks through convenience stores, independent retail chains and petrol forecourts. It was established in 2001 and is headquartered in Leeds.

== History ==
The company was founded on 27 June 2001 by Leeds Metropolitan University graduate Simon Gray at the age of 28 with a bank loan of £30,000. Gray said in an interview that he wanted to take Boost to independent retailers because it would have been "crazy to challenge the big brands with a me-too product". The company was originally known as Blast UK Limited before changing its name to Boost Drinks Limited in July 2001. Gray paid back the bank loan within the company's first 12 months and distributed Boost into international markets such as Spain, Croatia, South Africa and Nigeria. The brand was launched in Northern Ireland in 2003, with the Northern Irish market accounting for approximately 15 per cent of the company's overall business by 2018.

As of 2011, the company employed eight people and had launched in 12 countries. The price of several Boost products increased in 2020. In September of the same year, Boost unveiled a £1.2 million "Choose Now" marketing campaign, which included a £10,000 fund to be shared by three community groups. Boost introduced a "Boost Retailer Hall of Fame" in Northern Ireland during June 2021, with the first winner being Kearney's shop in Randalstown, County Antrim, receiving 30% of the overall vote.

In December 2022, it was announced that Boost was acquired by A.G. Barr for £20 million.

== Partnerships ==
Boost Drinks has had a partnership with Air Ambulance Northern Ireland since 2019, when the company gave £10,000 to the charity. From February 2021, under a deal signed with Dorset-based brewery Hall & Woodhouse, Boost Drinks became responsible for the distribution, marketing and sale of soft drink brand Rio. Boost Drinks became the "official energy drinks partner" of Leeds United for the 2021–22 Premier League season.

== Products ==
In 2010, the company attempted to introduce a smoothie product, but the response was "disappointing" and it was soon abandoned. Boost has released a number of "limited edition" flavours, to its energy and sports drinks line, including a 'Winter Spice' flavour in 2015, a tropical flavour in 2016, a pomegranate and blueberry flavour in 2017, and a grape and cherry product in 2018. Boost also launched protein drinks and an iced coffee range in 2016 and 2020 respectively. In 2022, Boost released a fruit-flavoured product range branded as "Juic'd".
