= Rio (British drink) =

British soft drink brand

- Type: Soft drink
- Manufacturer: A.G. Barr
- Origin: United Kingdom
- Introduced: 1980s
- Website: drinkrio.com

Rio Tropical Limited, formerly known as Rio Riva and Arriva, is a British brand of soft drink made by A.G. Barr.

== History ==
The drink was created by a Dorset brewery Hall & Woodhouse in the 1980s and was originally named Arriva derived from the French arriver which means to arrive. In 1994 its name was changed to Rio Riva before being changed to simply Rio. In 2013, Dragon Rouge redesigned Rio based on market research.

Rio was redesigned again in 2017 by Pearlfisher based on Brazilian street art to target a younger demographic. The logo was changed as well, with the ‘O’ being turned into a sun to emphasise their slogan of "Celebrate the Sunny". In June of the same year they introduced 500ml PET bottles.

In 2021 Rio entered a partnership deal with Boost Drinks, with the company overseeing the sales, marketing and distribution of Rio.

In October 2023, Rio was acquired from Hall and Woodhouse by British soft drink manufacturer A.G. Barr for £12.3 million.
