= Smithstone, Cumbernauld =

Area of Cumbernauld, Scotland

Coordinates: 55°57′00″N 4°02′10″W

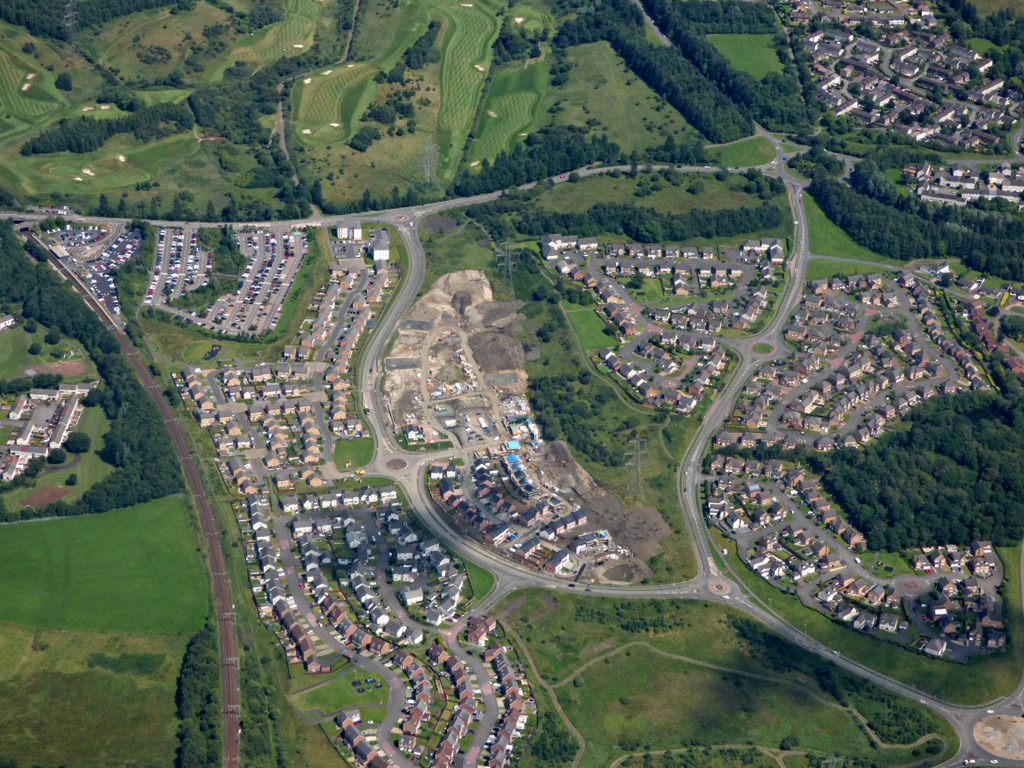
Smithstone from the air (2019)

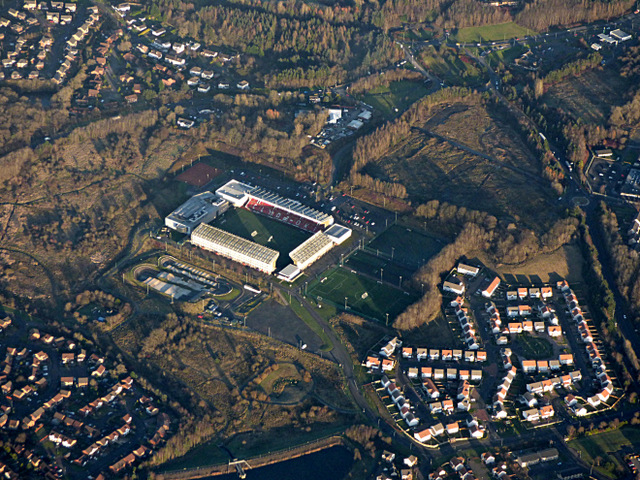
Broadwood Stadium with Broadwood Loch at the bottom between Blackwood on the left and Collingwood on the right. Smithstone is at the top

Smithstone (Scots: Smeeston) is an area of Cumbernauld, North Lanarkshire. Versions of the name are recorded in the vicinity from the mid fourteenth century onwards. The area was originally a farm and the first Ordnance Survey map shows it as Smithstown. A coal mining and quarrying business had developed in the 19th century and Smithston Row and Smithston Quarry are shown on the map. North Lanarkshire Council sold off the land to developers for housing and it is now anticipated that up to 700 houses will be built in the area. In late 2005 a new road from Smithstone Road to Constarry Road outside Croy, was opened, providing a link to the separate housing estates of the area. Being west of Croy, the area is the closest point of Cumbernauld to Twechar and the Antonine Wall fort at Bar Hill.
