= Blackwood, Cumbernauld =

Area of Cumbernauld, Scotland

Coordinates: 55.943°N 4.049°W

Blackwood: Scottish Gaelic: Coille Dubh
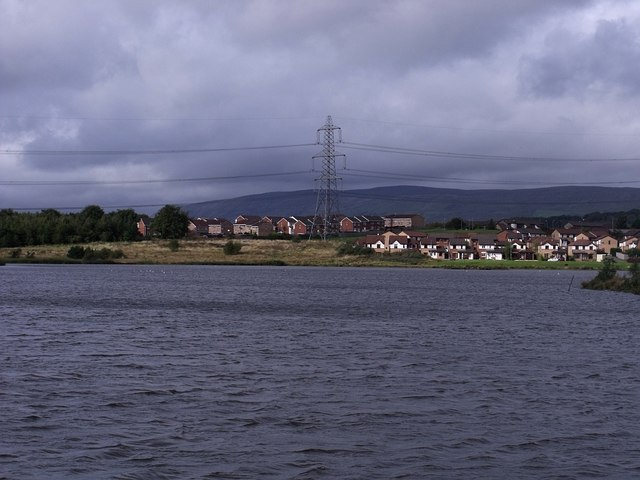
- Blackwood and the Campsies from Broadwood Loch (2009)

- Location within North Lanarkshire
- Population: 1,470 (as of 2000)
- OS grid reference: NS721740
- Council area: North Lanarkshire
- Lieutenancy area: Lanarkshire
- Country: Scotland
- Sovereign state: United Kingdom
- Post town: GLASGOW
- Postcode district: G68
- Dialling code: 01236
- Police: Scotland
- Fire: Scottish
- Ambulance: Scottish
- UK Parliament: Cumbernauld, Kilsyth and Kirkintilloch East; Coatbridge, Chryston and Bellshill
- Scottish Parliament: Cumbernauld and Kilsyth

Blackwood is an area in Cumbernauld, a town in North Lanarkshire, Scotland.

Located north of Westfield and towards Kirkintilloch, construction of Blackwood first began in the early 1990s and is home to several housing estates, as well as a man-made reservoir (Broadwood Loch) and Broadwood Stadium, the former home of Clyde F.C. from 1994 to 2022. In the 2001 census, Blackwood had a population of 1,470 and was revealed to be the largest new settlement in Scotland that had not been recognised as a locality in the previous census in 1991. Housing construction in the area continued throughout the 1990s and 2000s.

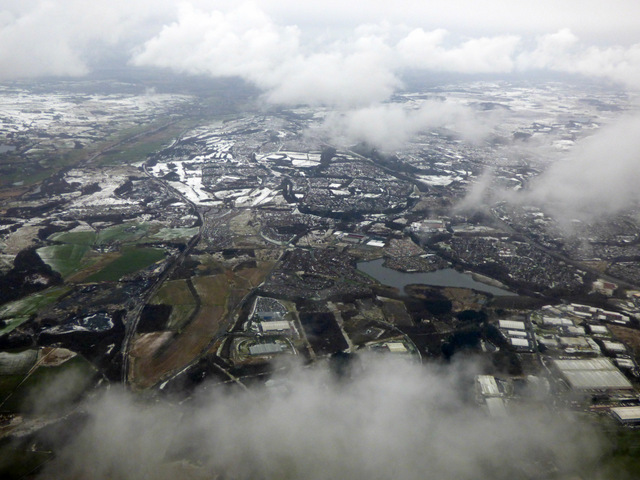
Blackwood from the air. Mollins Road is obscured by the cloud at the bottom of the photograph (2017)
