= A.G. Barr =

Scottish soft drink producer

A.G. Barr p.l.c.

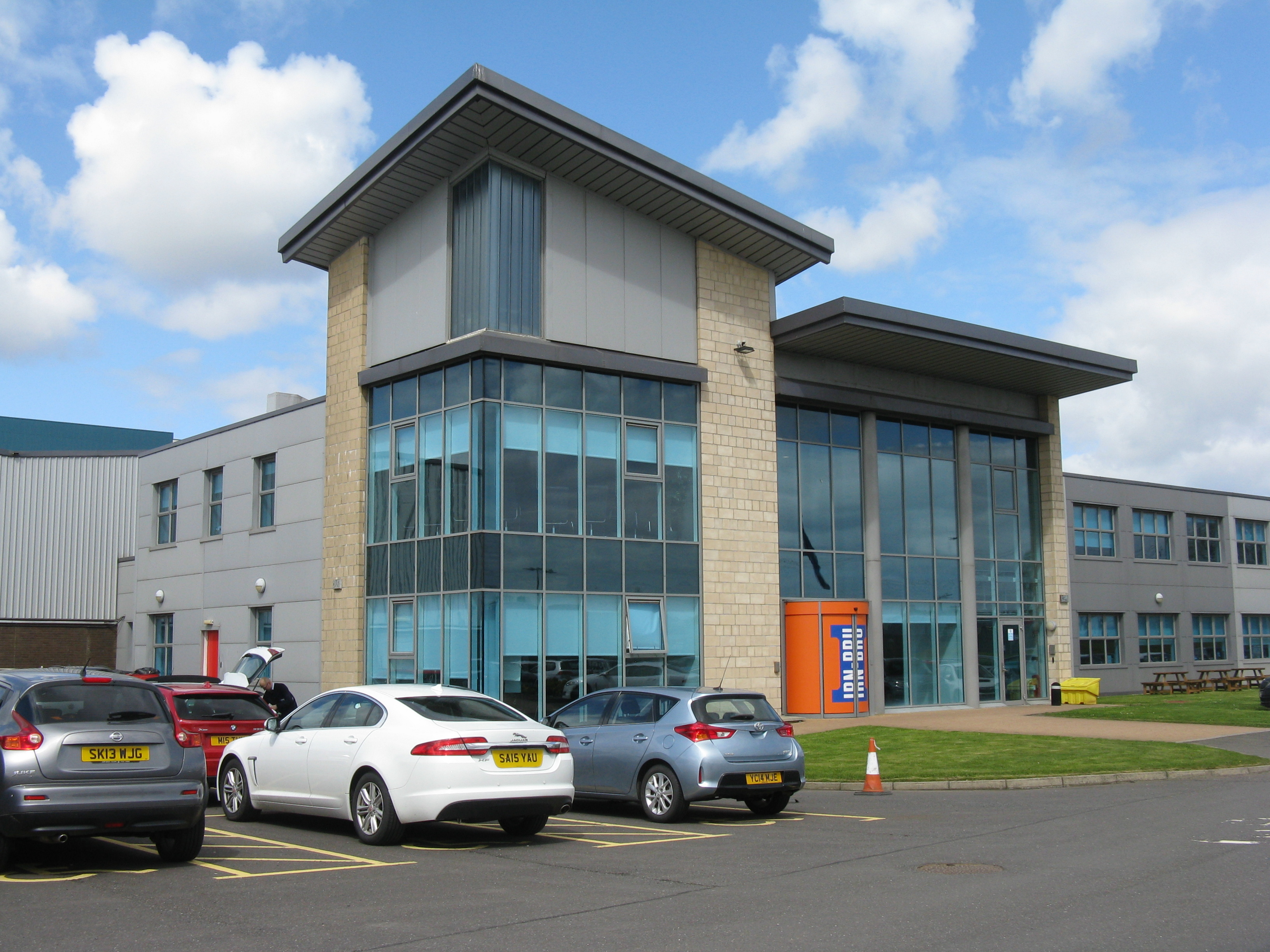
- Head offices at Cumbernauld
- Type: Public
- Traded as: LSE: BAG; FTSE 250 Component
- Industry: Soft drinks; Energy drinks
- Founded: 1875; 151 years ago
- Founder: Robert Barr
- Headquarters: Cumbernauld, Scotland, UK
- Area served: Worldwide
- Key people: Mark Allen (chairman); Euan Sutherland (Chief Executive)
- Brands: Irn-Bru; Tizer; Rubicon; Boost
- Revenue: ▲£437.3 million (2026)
- Operating income: ▲£61.6 million (2026)
- Net income: ▲£46.7 million (2026)
- Number of employees: 981 (2025)
- Website: agbarr.co.uk

A.G. Barr p.l.c., commonly known as Barr's, is a soft drink and energy drink manufacturer based in Cumbernauld, Scotland. It is widely known for manufacturing the drink Irn-Bru. The company is listed on the London Stock Exchange (LSE) and is a constituent of the FTSE 250 Index.

== History ==
The company was founded in 1875 by Robert Barr in Falkirk. In 1887, his son, Robert Fulton Barr, set up a division of the original company in Glasgow, which had a much larger population. In 1892 the Glasgow branch passed to Andrew Greig Barr (where the name A.G. Barr comes from), a brother of the branch's founder. In 1899, they soft launched Irn-Bru, eventually launching it in 1901. The Falkirk and Glasgow divisions merged in 1959, and the company was listed on the London Stock Exchange in 1965.

In 1972, A.G. Barr acquired the Tizer brand. In 2001 the company acquired Findlays Mineral Water which is sourced in the Lammermuir Hills. In 2002, Roger White joined A.G. Barr as managing director, and in 2004 became the first chief executive from outside the Barr family.

The company acquired Forfar-based Strathmore Mineral Water in May 2006. The Irn-Bru 32 energy drink variant was launched in 2006. In 2008, the company purchased the Taut sports drink range, and exotic fruit drink company Rubicon. In 2007 A.G. Barr began production and distribution of Rockstar Energy for the United Kingdom and Republic of Ireland. This contract was terminated in 2020, following the acquisition by PepsiCo. In November 2012, the company agreed to merge with Britvic, which produces drinks like J_{2}O, Tango and Robinsons, as well as holding the authority to produce Pepsi for the UK market, to create one of Europe's largest soft drinks companies. The merger was abandoned in July 2013.

In 2014 A.G. Barr signed a 10-year deal with Dr Pepper Snapple Group to sell, market and distribute the Snapple brand in the UK and some of Europe. The company acquired a cocktail mixer business, Funkin, in February 2015. In December 2022, the company acquired Boost Drinks for £20 million from founders Simon and Alison Gray, and took full control of oat milk company Moma Foods the same month after buying a majority share in 2021.

In October 2023, it was announced A.G. Barr had acquired the Rio Tropical Limited soft drinks brand from the independent brewer and pub company, Hall and Woodhouse Limited, for £12.3 million. In March 2025, A.G. Barr announced plans to discontinue Strathmore bottled water in a move that could see the closure of its Forfar factory; however, in July 2025 the brand was acquired by Tŷ Nant which safeguarded the jobs. Also in July A.G. Barr acquired a majority stake in Innate-Essence Limited, parent company of The Turmeric Co.

In February 2026, the company announced that it was to acquire Hexham-based Fentimans for £38 million and Devon-based Frobishers for £13 million.

== Brands ==
The company's brands are as follows:

- Barr
  - Bubblegum
  - Cherryade
  - Barr Cola
  - Cream Soda
  - Diet Cola
  - Diet Lemonade
  - D'N'B (Dandelion and Burdock)
  - Lemonade
  - Limeade
  - Raspberryade
  - Red Kola
  - Ginger Beer
  - Shandyade
  - Orangeade
  - Pineapple
  - Xtra Cola
- Boost Drinks
  - Apple & Raspberry Sugar Free
  - Boost Energy Original
  - Boost Sugar Free
  - Blueberry Raspberry
  - Red Berry
  - Mango
  - Cherry
  - Tropical Sugar Free
  - Lemon & Lime
- Bundaberg
  - Bundaberg Ginger Beer
  - Bundaberg Root Beer
- Funkin
- Irn-Bru
  - Irn-Bru
  - Diet Irn-Bru
  - Irn-Bru Zero
  - Irn-Bru 1901
  - Pwr-Bru Origin (Original)
  - Pwr-Bru Diablo (Cherry)
  - Pwr-Bru Dropkick (Tropical)
  - Pwr-Bru Maverick (Berry)
  - Pwr-Bru Dynamo (Fruit Punch)
- KA
  - KA Abbott's Ginger Beer
  - KA Black Grape Sparkling
  - KA Black Grape Still
  - KA Fruit Punch Sparkling
  - KA Fruit Punch Still
  - KA Karibbean Kola
  - KA Pineapple Sparkling
  - KA Pineapple Still
  - KA Strawberry Sparkling
  - KA Strawberry Still
- MOMA
- OMJ!
  - Apple Tang Still Juice Drink
  - Sparkling Berry Blast Juice Drink
  - Sparkling Tropical Juice Drink
  - Very Berry Still Juice Drink
- Rio
  - Rio Tropical
  - Rio Light
- Rubicon
- Simply Fruity
  - Apple
  - Apple & Blackcurrant
  - Orange
  - Strawberry
- Snapple
- Sun Exotic
  - Still Citrus Twist Juice
  - Still Pineapple & Coconut Juice
  - Sparkling Pineapple & Coconut Juice
  - Still Tropical Juice
  - Sparking Tropical Juice
- Tizer

== Legal disputes ==
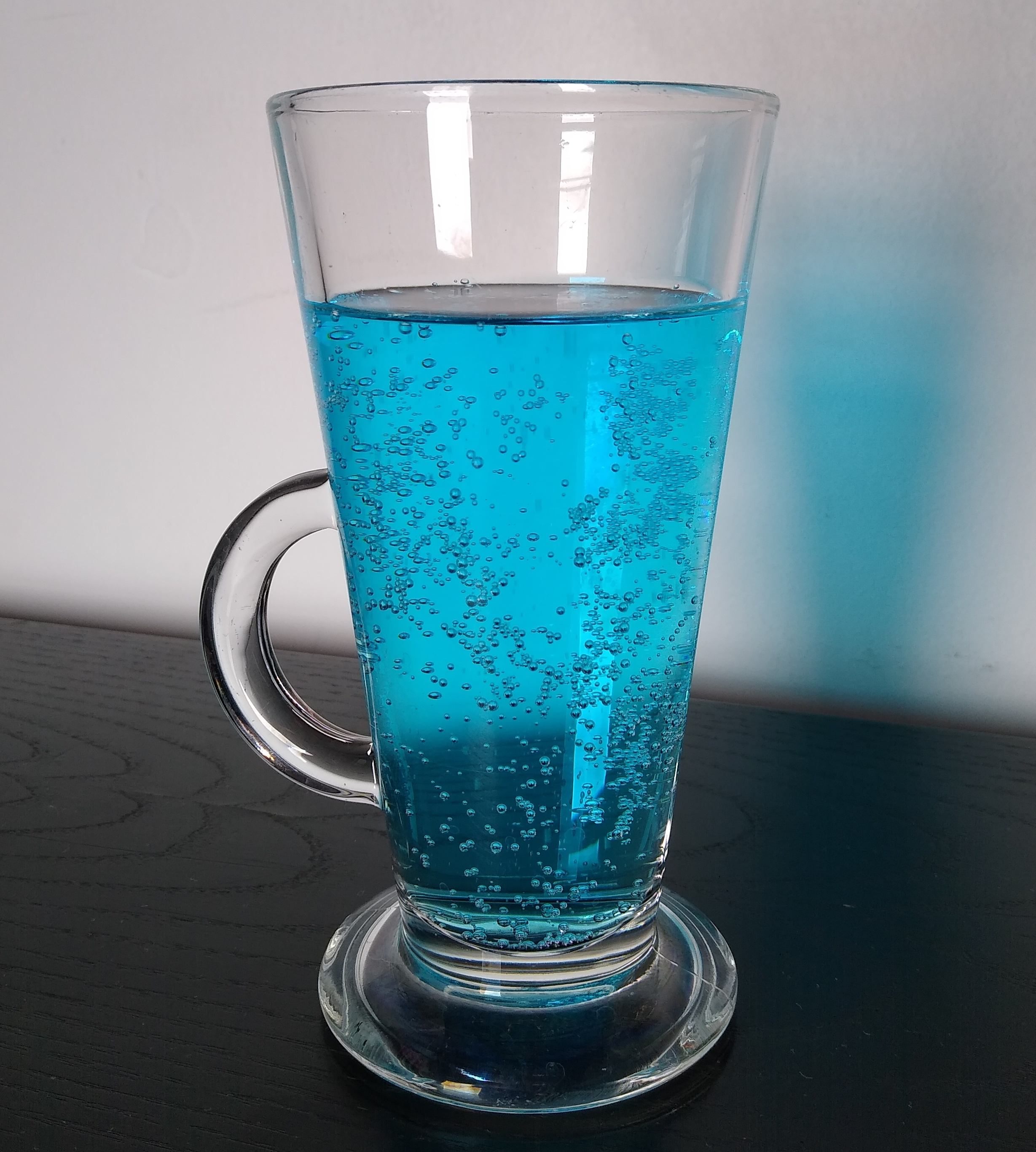
Barr brand bubblegum-flavoured soft drink

On 14 July 1961, the Coca-Cola Company asked Lord Walker (Note: Judges within the Outer House of the Court of Session are named as "Lord [name]" or "Lady [name]", the full name of Lord Walker is James Walker.) for an interim interdict about the type of bottle used by A.G. Barr's "Kolabar", "Cydrap" and "Stilkrush" in the Court of Session. Coca-Cola's argument was that "real danger that the bottle used by [A.G. Barr] for containing Kolabar will be mistaken by the public for [Coca-Cola].", while A.G. Barr's argument was "the position of Coca-Cola in the soft drinks industry in Scotland is insignificant in comparison with that of [A.G. Barr]". Lord Walker refused the interim interdict, as a large part of their business could've been disturbed, additionally because Coca-Cola made no sales in the country at that point.

== Operations ==
A.G. Barr produces a variety of soft drinks from production sites at Cumbernauld, and Milton Keynes.

The company has also previously had production sites in Atherton, Falkirk, Forfar, Mansfield, Parkhead (Glasgow), Pitcox and Tredegar.
