= Pizzaland =

Former chain of pizza restaurants

- Type: Subsidiary
- Industry: Fast food
- Founded: 1970; 56 years ago
- Founder: David Dutton
- Defunct: 1996; 30 years ago
- Fate: Acquired By Pizza Hut
- Successor: Pizza Hut
- Headquarters: London
- Number of locations: 140
- Key people: Jullian Griffiths; Greg Barwick; Michael Stidolph
- Products: Pizza, other foods

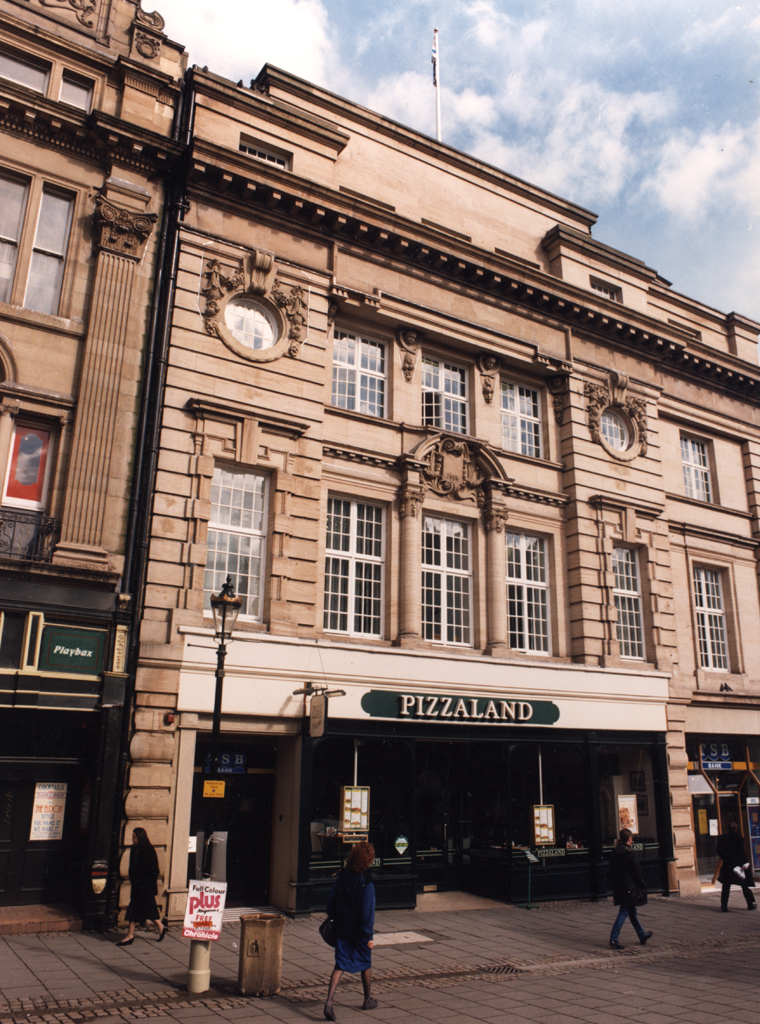
Pizzaland restaurant on Grey Street in Newcastle upon Tyne, 1989

Pizzaland was a chain of pizza restaurants owned by Associated Newspapers and then by United Biscuits. In the early 1990s, Pizza Hut and Pizzaland were regarded as the largest pizza eateries in Britain; UK business ceased in 1996. International branches continue to operate.

== History ==
Pizzaland (Associated Restaurants) was founded in 1970 by David Dutton, financed by Associated Newspapers. The chain rapidly expanded throughout London, and then into the Northwest. The first restaurant outside London was opened in Deansgate, Manchester; from its northern/southern base Pizzaland grew into a chain of over 140 restaurants before United Biscuits acquired the company in 1980. Jullian Griffiths, Greg Barwick and Michael Stidolph were the senior managers responsible for the successful growth of the company in the late 1970s and early 1980s. In 1983, a total change in senior management and a change in siting policy, that often resulted in Pizzaland opening in towns that were too small to support them, started the decline of a once successful business.

=== "Pizza for a penny" ===
In the late 1980s the chain aggressively tried to boost revenues with discount cut-out coupons in British tabloid newspapers; vouchers offering the same deals were often given directly to patrons for future visits. The most popular of these was the "pizza for a penny" scheme, whereby customers could purchase one pizza and obtain another of equal or lesser value for 1p. While initially a huge success, the offer had backfired by the mid 1990s since it became an expectation for customers, many of whom would no longer use the chain unless they could source a coupon beforehand. As such, the "pizza for a penny" strategy came to be regarded as a major catalyst in the demise of Pizzaland in the UK.

== Closure in Britain ==
In November, 1996, Whitbread bought the Pizzaland group Brightreasons and converted many Pizzaland locations into Pizza Hut, and some of the branches became Bella Pasta. With many unrelated eateries subsequently assuming the "Pizzaland" name, and the chain being retrospectively confused with Pizza Hut, its legacy in the UK is now obscured.

== See also ==
- PizzaExpress, a rival British chain
