= Hall & Woodhouse =

British regional brewery founded in Dorset

Hall & Woodhouse Ltd.
- Industry: Alcoholic beverage
- Founded: 1777
- Headquarters: Blandford St Mary, England, UK
- Products: Beer
- Owner: Woodhouse family
- Website: www.hall-woodhouse.co.uk

Hall and Woodhouse is a British regional brewery founded in 1777 by Charles Hall in Blandford Forum, England. The company operates over 180 public houses in the south of England, and brews under the name Badger Beers.

== History ==
The brewery traces its roots to 1777, when Charles Hall founded the Ansty Brewery in Ansty, Dorset. The Hall & Woodhouse partnership dates from 1847, when Charles' son and successor went into business with George Woodhouse, who had earlier been employed as head brewer.

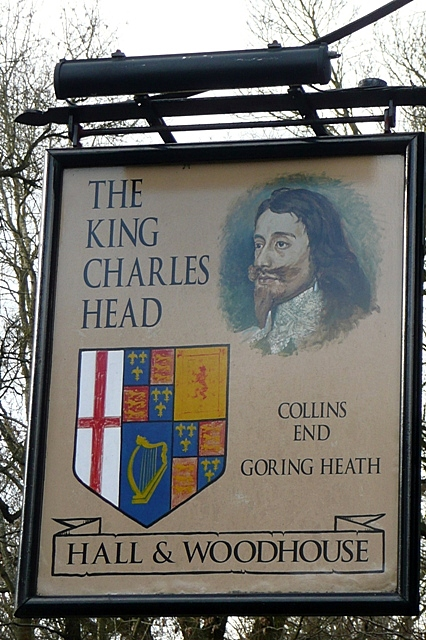
"The King Charles Head" pub sign in Goring Heath (2009)

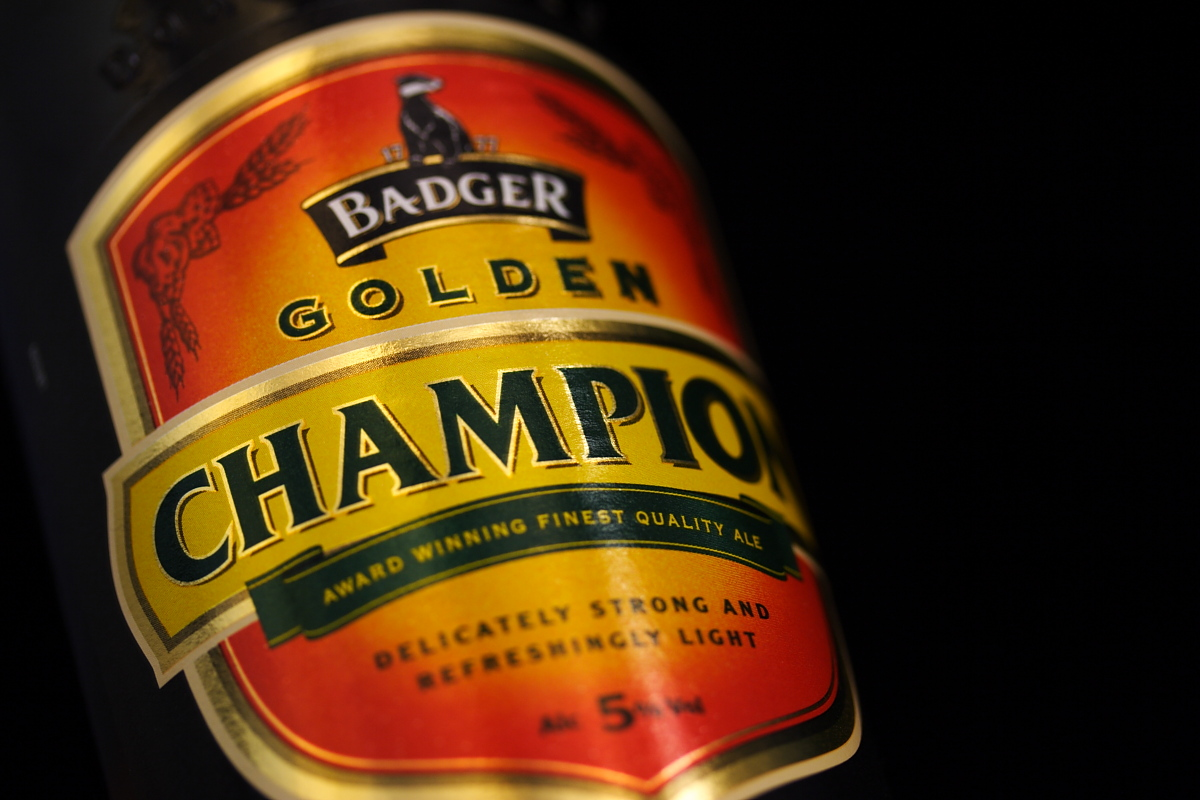
Golden Champion Ale

In 1875, the firm's logo of a badger was first introduced, and in 1900, when a new brewery was built to replace the original, it was named after the logo. The logo has evolved over the years. The firm remains a family business.

In 2000 the King and Barnes brewery business in Horsham was acquired. Hall & Woodhouse retained the King and Barnes chain of pubs and the rights to the brand names of the King and Barnes beers, but the brewery premises were sold.

The company operates over 180 public houses in the south of England.

== Beers ==
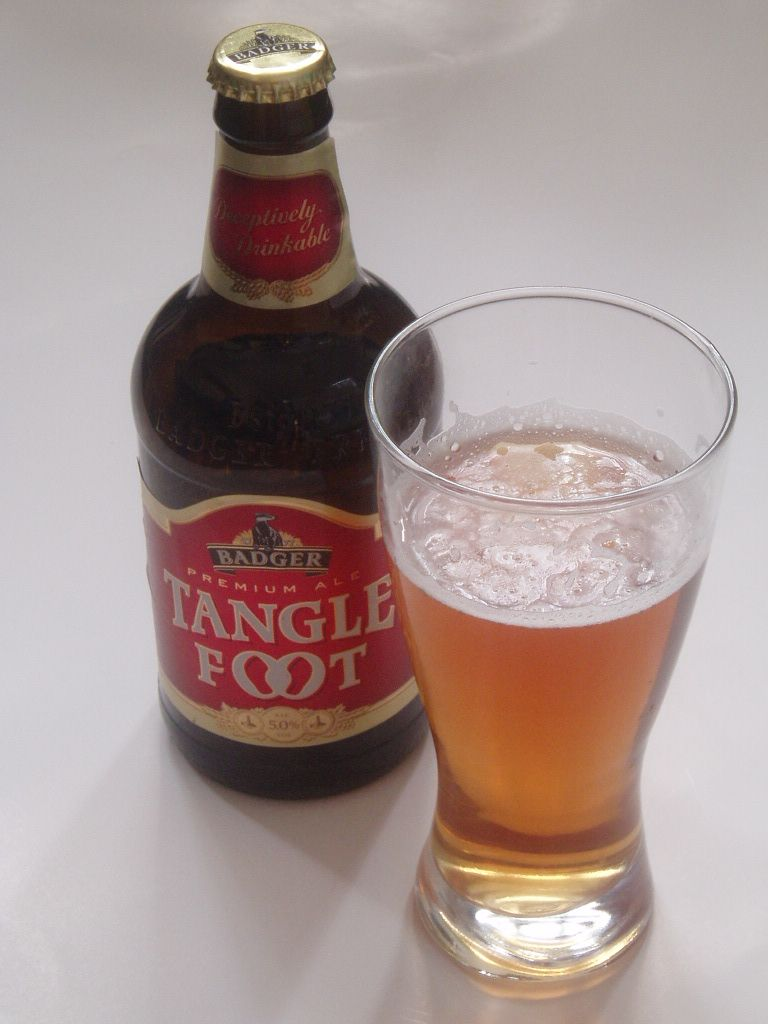
Tanglefoot beer

Blandford Fly (formerly Blandford Flyer) is a 5.2% dark bottled ale flavoured with ginger and spices.

Chocolate and Orange Stout, a 5.0% stout that is brewed on behalf of Sainsbury's supermarket as one of their "Taste the Difference", premium own-brand line of products.

Cranborne Poacher (formerly Poacher's Choice) is a 5.7% bottled ruby ale with strong flavours of damsons and liquorice.

Fursty Ferret is an amber ale, 4.1% as a cask ale, and 4.4% as a filtered beer in bottles and cans. It was originally brewed at the Gribble Inn, which was bought by Hall & Woodhouse in 1991. The pub was sold back to the landlord in 2005, with Hall & Woodhouse retaining the rights to the brand name Fursty Ferret.

Golden Champion is a 4.5% pale ale with an aroma of elderflower.

Hopping Hare is a 4.4% abv light coloured pale ale made from a mix of American Amarillo, Cascade hops and English Flagon barley.

Master Stout is a 5.0% coffee stout available in bottles.

Tanglefoot is a golden ale, 4.7% as a cask ale, and 5.0% as a filtered beer in bottles and cans. It is made from a mix of English Flagon barley, Goldings and Challenger hops, with a pear drop taste. According to a story presently written on the bottle, it was given its name when the head brewer drank "several tankards" and "fell on" a name for the beer. The cask version is widely available in the south of England, and a pasteurised version is available in bottles and cans in supermarkets nationally.

Wicked Wyvern is a 5.5% pale ale with an aroma of grapefruit.

Winter Porter is available seasonally from Sainsbury's supermarket as one of their "Taste the Difference", premium own-brand line of products.

== Soft drinks ==
The company also marketed soft drinks known as Rio. In 1957 Hall and Woodhouse started manufacturing soft drinks, from 1974 under the Panda Pops brand, but closed the plant and sold the brand to Nichols plc in 2005, citing its key competitors as having the strategic advantage of lower production costs through greater scale, lower wage costs, better geographical location and more efficient and up-to-date plant.

In October 2023, it was announced Rio had been acquired from Hall and Woodhouse by British soft drink manufacturer, A.G. Barr for £12.3 million.
