= Irn-Bru =

Scottish carbonated soft drink

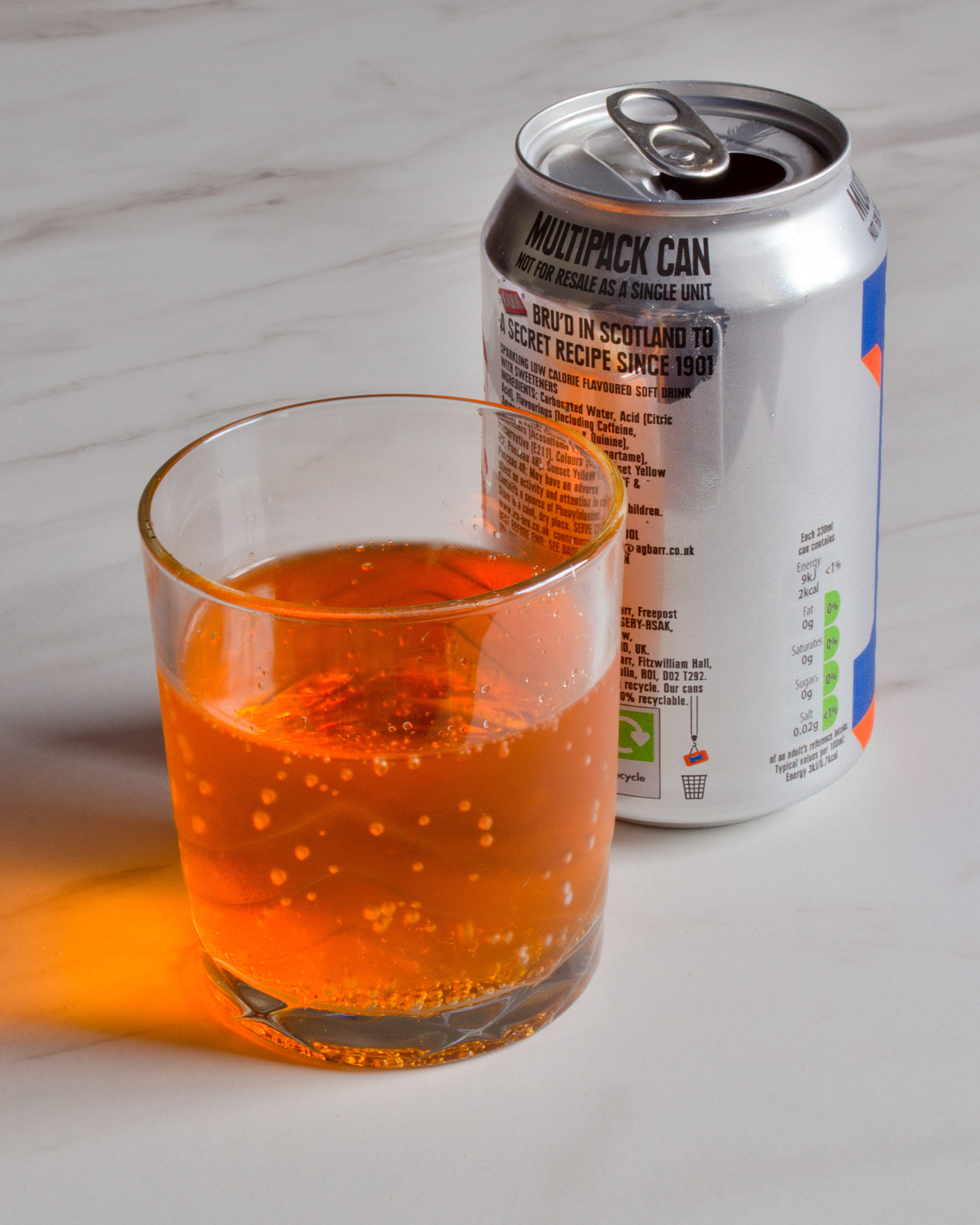
- Sugar free Irn-Bru in a glass, with the associated silver sugar free variant can
- Type: Carbonated soft drink
- Manufacturer: A.G. Barr
- Origin: Falkirk and Glasgow, Scotland
- Introduced: 1889 (as Iron Brew); 1899 (test launch); 1901 (officially); 2018 (new recipe)
- Discontinued: Irn-Bru XS; Irn-Bru 32; Fiery Irn-Bru
- Colour: Orange
- Ingredients: carbonated water; sugar; citric acid; flavourings (incl. caffeine, ammonium ferric citrate, quinine); sodium benzoate; Sunset yellow FCF; Ponceau 4R; Acesulfame K; Aspartame
- Variants: Irn-Bru; Irn-Bru Diet; Irn-Bru Zero; Irn-Bru 1901; Irn-Bru Energy; Pwr-Bru
- Website: irn-bru.co.uk

Irn-Bru (/ˌaɪərn ˈbruː/ "iron brew", Scots: [ˌəirənˈbruː]) is a Scottish carbonated soft drink, often described as "Scotland's other national drink" after Scotch whisky. Introduced in 1901, the drink is produced in Westfield, Cumbernauld, North Lanarkshire, by A.G. Barr of Glasgow. As well as being sold throughout the United Kingdom, Irn-Bru is available throughout the world and can usually be bought where there is a significant community of people from Scotland. The brand also has its own tartan. It has been the top-selling soft drink in Scotland for over a century, competing directly with global brands such as Coca-Cola.

The flavour of Irn-Bru is known to be difficult to describe, a fact that has even been used in the manufacturers' advertising. Public surveys have turned up words such as tutti frutti, bubble gum, cream soda, and even an undertone of iron or rust that has been referred to as 'girders'.

Originally selling it as Iron Brew, the drink's makers, A.G. Barr, were forced to change the name of the drink in 1946 following a change in the law that stipulated that the marketing of products be "literally true". As the drink did not contain much iron, nor was it brewed, the passage of this legislation led the company to change the product's name to the presently used Irn-Bru. Irn-Bru has long been the most popularly consumed soft drink in Scotland, consistently beating rivals such as Coca-Cola, Pepsi and Fanta, and reportedly sells 20 cans every second throughout Scotland. Irn-Bru is sold in a number of international food and drink markets, including countries such as Belgium, Finland, Malta, the Netherlands, Spain, Sweden, certain African countries, the Middle East, and North America.

== Overview and history ==
=== Appearance ===
Irn-Bru is known for its bright orange colour and unique flavour. As of 1999, it contained 0.002% of ammonium ferric citrate, sugar, 32 flavouring agents including caffeine and quinine (but not in Australia), and two controversial colourings (Sunset Yellow FCF E110 and Ponceau 4R E124). On 27 January 2010, soft-drink manufacturer A.G. Barr agreed to a Food Standards Agency voluntary ban on these two colourings although no date was set for their replacement.

After lobbying by First Minister of Scotland Alex Salmond, a proposed restriction of Sunset Yellow to 10 mg/litre was eased to 20 mg/litre in 2011 – the same amount present in Irn-Bru. As of August 2026, Irn-Bru still contains these colourings.

=== Origins ===
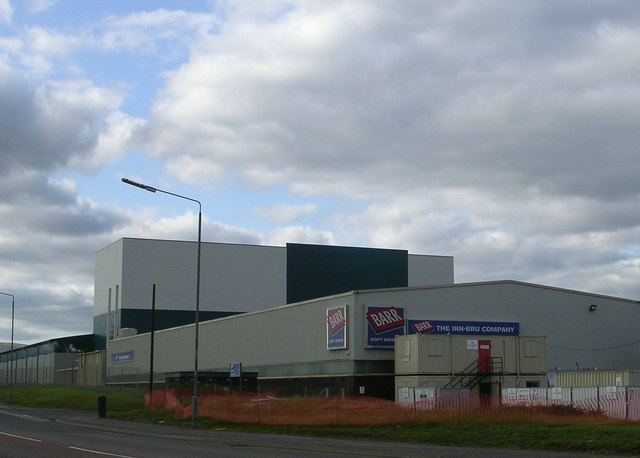
A.G. Barr factory in Cumbernauld where Irn Bru is produced

The first Iron Brew drink was produced by the Maas & Waldstein chemicals company of New York in 1889 under the name IRONBREW. The drink was popular across North America and was widely copied. A similar beverage was launched in 1898 by London essence firm Stevenson & Howell that supplied soft drinks manufacturers in the UK and colonies. Many local bottlers around the UK began selling their own version of the beverage.

Despite the official launch date for Barr's Iron Brew being given as 1901, the firms AG Barr & Co (Glasgow) and Robert Barr (Falkirk) jointly launched their own Iron Brew drink at least two years earlier, according to a document in the firm's archives which indicates that the drink was already enjoying strong sales by May 1899. The strongman image which Barr's adopted for their bottle labels and advertising had been trademarked by the firm Stevenson & Howell in 1898. Barr's ordered their labels directly from Stevenson & Howell, which also sold Barr's many of the individual flavours with which they mixed their own drinks. An advertisement for Barr's Iron Brew dated 1900 featuring the original strongman label can be found in Falkirk's Local History Archives.

=== Trademark ===
Barr's trademark application for the brand name Irn-Bru dates from July 1946 when the drink was still off sale because of wartime regulations. The firm first commercialised their drink using this new name in 1948 once government SDI consolidation of the soft drinks industry had ended. The name change followed the introduction of new labelling restrictions which cracked down on spurious health claims and introduced minimum standards for drinks claiming to contain minerals such as iron. However, according to Robert Barr OBE (chairman 1947–1978), there was also a commercial rationale behind the unusual spelling. "Iron Brew" had come to be understood as a generic product category in the UK, whereas adopting the name "Irn-Bru" allowed the firm to have a legally protected brand identity that would enable the firm to benefit from the popularity of their wartime "Adventures of Ba-Bru" comic strip advertising. (The "Iron Brew" name has continued to be used for many versions of the drink sold by rival manufacturers.)

=== Popularity and new variants ===
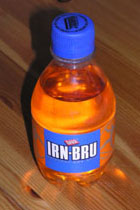
A small bottle of Irn Bru in the former labelling and packaging (2004)

1980 saw the introduction of Low Calorie Irn-Bru: this was re-launched in 1991 as Diet Irn-Bru and again in 2011 as Irn-Bru Sugar Free. The Irn-Bru 32 energy drink variant was launched in 2006, but was discontinued shortly after.

Irn-Bru has long been the most popular soft drink in Scotland, with Coca-Cola second, but competition between the two brands brought their sales to roughly equal levels by 2003. It is also the third best selling soft drink in the UK, after Coca-Cola and Pepsi, outselling high-profile brands such as Fanta, Dr Pepper, Sprite and 7 Up. This success in defending its home market (a feat claimed only by Irn-Bru, Inca Kola and Thums Up; Thums Up sold out to Coca-Cola in 1993, and Inka Kola owners Corporación Lindley S.A. entered into a joint venture with Coca-Cola in 1999, giving up all rights to the name outside Peru) led to ongoing speculation that Coca-Cola, PepsiCo, Inc. or its UK brand franchisee Britvic would attempt to buy A.G. Barr. In November 2012 AG Barr and Britvic announced a merger proposal, but in July 2013 the merger collapsed when terms could not be agreed.

Irn-Bru's advertising slogans used to be 'Scotland's other National Drink', referring to whisky, and 'Made in Scotland from girders', a reference to the rusty colour of the drink; though the closest one can come to substantiating this claim is the 0.002% ammonium ferric citrate listed in the ingredients.

Fiery Irn-Bru, a limited edition variant, was released in autumn 2011. It was packaged with a black and orange design, and with the signature man icon with an added image of a fire. It featured the traditional Irn-Bru flavour with an aftertaste similar to ginger.

Irn-Bru is also sold in reusable 750 ml glass bottles, The bottles were originally able to be returned to the manufacturer in exchange for a 30 pence (previously 20p) deposit paid on purchase. This scheme was widely available in shops across Scotland and led to the colloquial term for an empty: a "glass cheque". As a result of a 40% drop in returned bottles since the 1990s, Barr ultimately deemed the washing and re-filling process uneconomical, and on 1 January 2016 ceased the scheme.

In 2016, a new diet variant called Irn-Bru Xtra was launched in different branding to the existing sugar free variety in a similar fashion to Coca-Cola Zero and Pepsi Max.

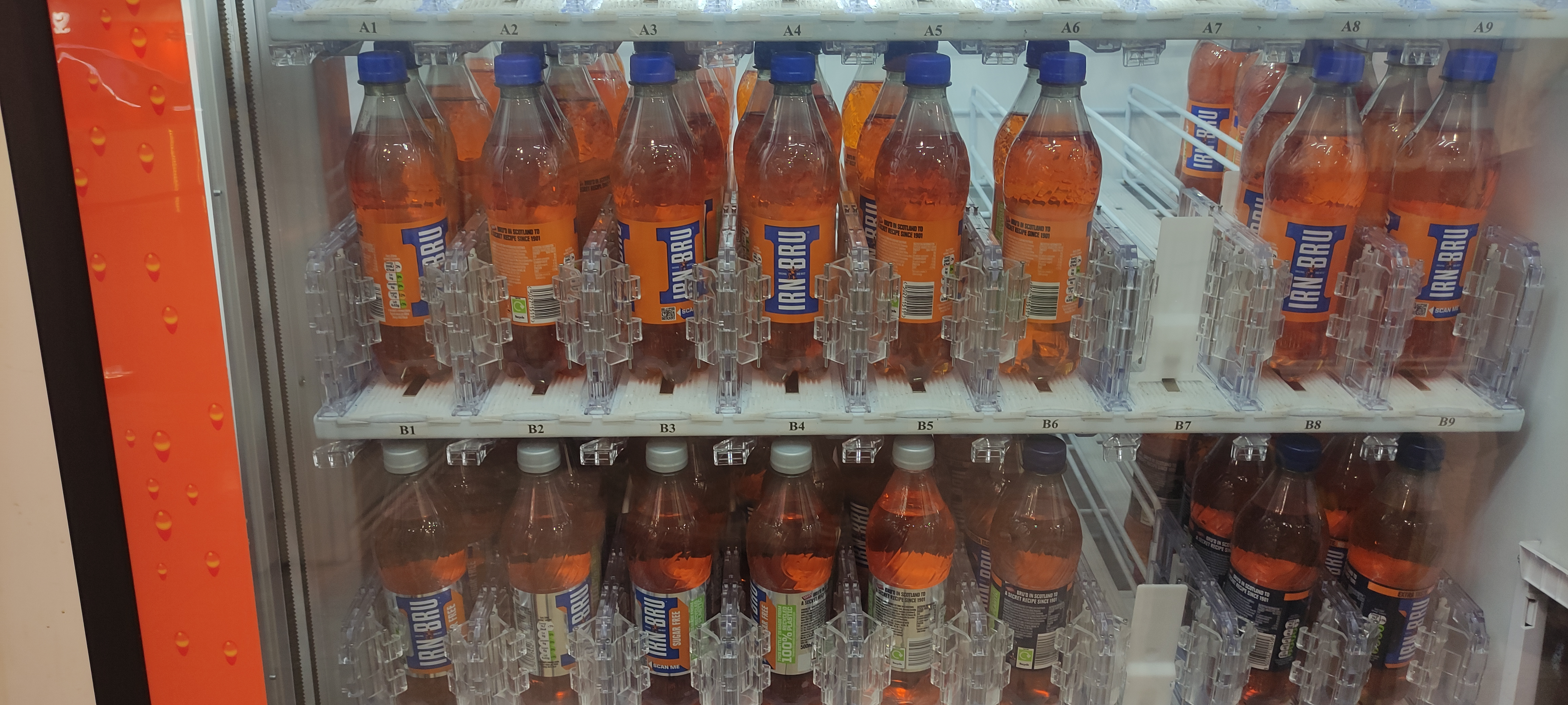
Irn-Bru bottles displayed in a vending machine

Barr changed the formula of Irn-Bru in January 2018 in response to a sugar tax implemented in the UK in April 2018, intended to combat obesity. By reducing the sugar content to less than 5g per 100ml, Barr has made Irn-Bru exempt from the tax. The manufacturer asserted that "most people will not be able to tell the difference in flavour between the old and new formulas", but fans of the drink launched an unsuccessful 'Save Real Irn-Bru' campaign to stop or reverse the change, and began stocking up on the more sugary formula.

In May 2019, Barr announced two new energy drink variants of Irn-Bru called Irn-Bru Energy and Irn-Bru Energy No Sugar, which were released on 1 July 2019.

In October 2019, Barr announced the launch of "Irn-Bru 1901". The drink would be available for a limited time and use the original recipe from 1901. In March 2021, Barr announced the relaunch of Irn-Bru 1901 as a permanent addition to the Irn-Bru lineup.

Pwr-Bru launched in August 2023 in four flavours, Origin Original, Diablo Cherry, Maverick Berry and Dropkick Tropical. with a fifth, Dynamo Fruit Punch joining the line-up in 2025.

In anticipation of the drink's 125th anniversary in 2026 a new look and updated names for the Irn-Bru range began to roll out across December 2025. Irn-Bru Sugar Free was reverted back to its old name Diet Irn-Bru and Irn-Bru Xtra was changed to Irn-Bru Zero.

== Production ==
It is produced in Westfield, Cumbernauld, North Lanarkshire, since Barr's moved out of their Parkhead, Glasgow factory in the mid-2000s. In 2011, Irn-Bru closed their factory in Mansfield, making the Westfield plant in Cumbernauld the main location for production. Other manufacturing locations include the English city of Sheffield.

== Marketing ==
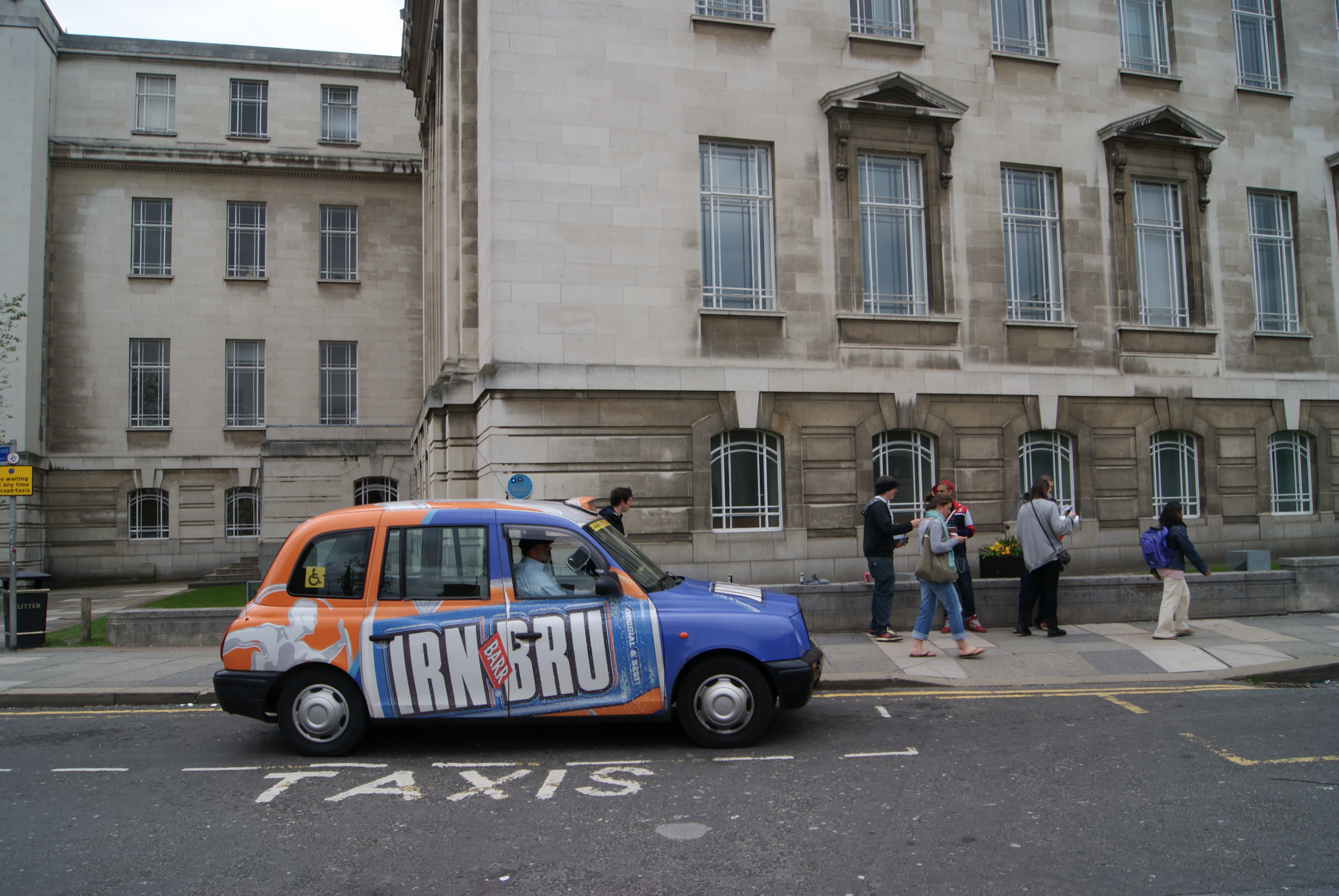
A Leeds taxi advertising Irn-Bru outside the University of Leeds

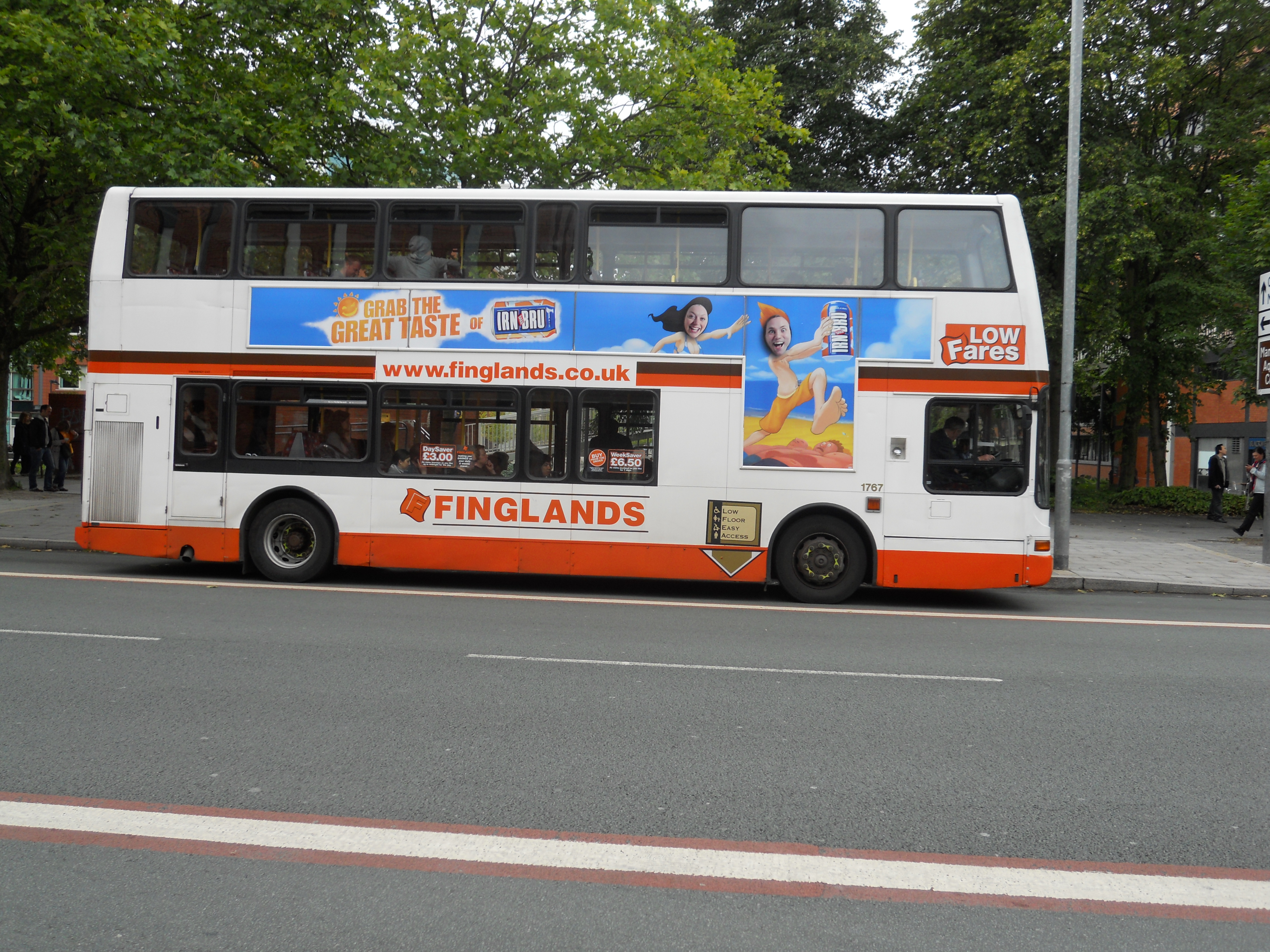
Irn-Bru advertising on the side of a bus in Manchester

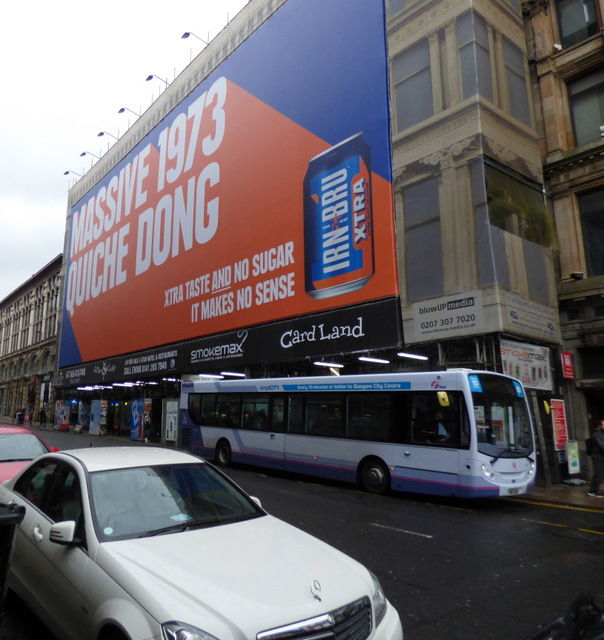
An Irn-Bru advertising billboard on Union Street, Glasgow, Scotland

Barr's actively promoted their Irn-Bru from the outset, with some of their earliest ads featuring world champion wrestlers and Highland Games athletes Donald Dinnie and Alex Munro who endorsed the drink by means of personal testimonials. In the 1930s, the firm began a long-running series of comic strip ads entitled "The Adventures of Ba-Bru" which ran in various local papers from April 1939 until October 1970. The last traces of this campaign, a large neon sign featuring Ba-Bru which stood in Union St above Glasgow Central railway station, was removed in 1983 and replaced with an illuminated display featuring the tagline "Your Other National Drink".

Barr has a long-established gimmick associating Irn-Bru with Scottishness, stemming from the claim of its being Scotland's most popular soft drink. A tagline, "Made in Scotland from girders", was used for several years from the 1980s, usually featuring Irn-Bru drinkers becoming unusually strong, durable or magnetic.

An advertising campaign launched in Spring 2000 aimed to "dramatise the extraordinary appeal of Irn-Bru in a likeably maverick style". David Amers, Planning Director, said: "Irn-Bru is the likeable maverick of the soft drinks market and these ads perfectly capture the brand's spirit." One involved a grandfather (played by actor Robert Wilson) who removed his false teeth to spoil his grandson's interest in his can of Irn-Bru. A further TV advertisement featured a senior citizen in a mobility scooter robbing a local shopping market of a supply of Irn-Bru.

In 2004 the company created a new concept "Phenomenal". In 2006 the company launched its first Christmas adverts. This campaign consisted of a parody commercial of a popular Christmas Cartoon, The Snowman, and was effective in interesting American audiences in the Irn-Bru brand. A sequel to the commercial would later be released in December 2018. Further advertising campaigns for Irn-Bru appeared in conjunction with the release of Irn-Bru 32 in 2006.

A 2009 advertisement for the product featured a group of high school pupils performing a musical number, with the refrain "It's fizzy, it's ginger, it's phenomenal!" It was a parody of High School Musical, and starred Jack Lowden. In 2012 the company changed its slogan to "gets you through", which see a number of people drinking Irn-Bru to get through tough situations. In response to the Coca-Cola 'Share a Coke' campaign, Barr decided to produce thousands of limited edition 750 ml bottles of Irn-Bru with the names 'Fanny', 'Senga', 'Rab' and 'Tam' on the label, mimicking that by Coca-Cola. The use of the name 'Fanny' ties in with one of Irn-Bru's controversial marketing advertisements.

One of the most controversial Irn-Bru television adverts evoked 1950s entertainment. A mother plays the piano, while the father and two children deliver a song which ends with the mother singing: "...even though I used to be a man". This advertisement was broadcast in 2000, but when it was repeated in 2003, it led to seventeen complaints about it being offensive to members of the transgender community. Issue A14 of the Ofcom Advertising Complaints bulletin reports that the children's response to their mother's claim was not offensive. According to the advertising agency Leith, the advertisement was meant to "create a sense of humour while confirming the maverick nature of the brand". However, the scene involving the mother shaving at the end of the advertisement was deemed by Ofcom to be "capable of causing offence by strongly reinforcing negative stereotypes", and so it was taken off the air.

In 2003, an Irn-Bru commercial which showed a midwife trying to entice a baby from its mother's womb during a difficult delivery sparked fifty complaints. Some saw it as upsetting to women who had suffered miscarriages. One billboard that drew criticism featured a young woman in a bikini along with the slogan "Diet Irn-Bru. I never knew four-and-a-half inches could give so much pleasure". Another featured a picture of a cow with the slogan "When I'm a burger, I want to be washed down with Irn-Bru". This billboard resulted in over 700 complaints but was cleared by advertisement watchdogs. According to a 2003 BBC report, a billboard which featured a depressed goth and the slogan "Cheer up Goth. Have an Irn-Bru." was also criticised for inciting bullying.

== Brand portfolio ==
| Name | Launched |
|---|---|
| Irn-Bru | 1901 |
| Diet Irn-Bru formerly Irn-Bru Sugar Free (2011–2025) | 1991 |
| Irn-Bru XS | 1995 |
| Irn-Bru 32 | 2006 |
| Fiery Irn-Bru | 2011 |
| Irn-Bru Zero formerly Irn-Bru Xtra (2016–2025) | 2016 |
| Irn-Bru Energy; Irn-Bru Energy Sugar Free | 2019 |
| Irn-Bru Crimbo Juice (Spiced Ginger) | 2019 |
| Irn-Bru 1901 | 2019 |
| Irn-Bru Xtra Tropical; Irn-Bru Xtra Ice Cream | 2023 |
| Pwr-Bru Origin (Original); Pwr-Bru Diablo (Cherry); Pwr-Bru Dropkick (Tropical); Pwr-Bru Maverick (Berry) | 2023 |
| Irn-Bru Xtra Raspberry Ripple; Irn-Bru Xtra Wild Berry Slush | 2024 |
| Pwr-Bru Dynamo (Fruit Punch) | 2025 |
| Irn-Bru Xtra Nessie Nectar; Irn-Bru Xtra Unicorn Tears | 2025 |
| Irn-Bru Winter Bru (Spiced Cinnamon & Ginger) | 2025 |
| Irn-Bru Zero Ice-Cream | 2026 |
| Irn-Bru Zero Cherry | 2026 |

McCowan's also produced Irn-Bru Bars, chewy, fizzy, bright orange confectionery bars which taste strongly of Irn-Bru, though production ended in late 2005. Irn-Bru sorbet is available in some speciality ice cream shops in Scotland.

The drink can be used as a mixer with alcoholic beverages, mainly vodka and whisky. Barr launched an alcopop drink combining Irn-Bru and Bell's whisky, although this proved to be unpopular and was discontinued.

== Exports and foreign markets ==
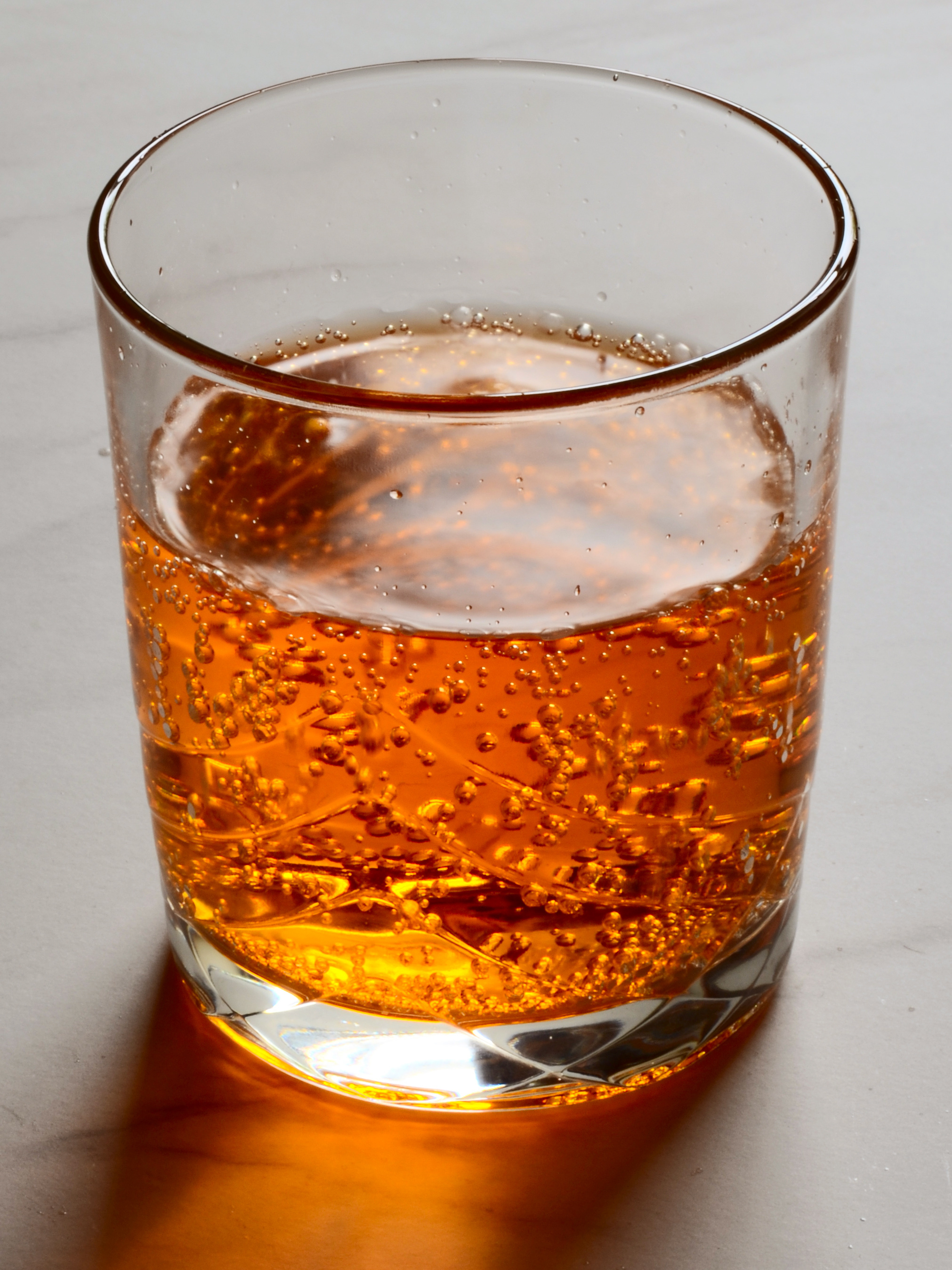
Irn-Bru Sugar Free

=== Australia ===
In Australia, Irn-Bru was manufactured and distributed under licence by Occasio Australia until 2009. It was available in 500 ml and 1.25-litre in both standard and diet. The drink enjoyed growing success in the country, with its first advertising campaign launched in Queensland in September 2007. It was initially available in major chains such as Coles and Woolworths, Caltex service stations and in many independent grocers and convenience stores. It was then delisted at Coles Supermarkets. Because of manufacturing and bottling issues, Occasio ceased local production in late 2009. It is now imported direct from the UK and distributed by British Provender, and can again be found in the international sections of major supermarket chains and some convenience stores.

=== Canada ===
Irn-Bru sold in Canada contained no caffeine until 2011, following the decision by Health Canada to repeal the ban on caffeine on non cola soft drinks in March 2010. Non-cola soft drinks can now contain up to 150ppm of caffeine. Now bottles of Irn-Bru have the label 'Now Contains caffeine' on the packaging. Irn-Bru in Canada is distributed by TFB & Associates Ltd from Markham, Ontario but is packaged by A.G. Barr in Glasgow, Scotland. Irn-Bru can be found at Sobeys, Co-op and Walmart supermarkets. The now-defunct McKinlay soft-drink company in Glace Bay, Cape Breton, Nova Scotia, Canada, offered its own non-licensed beverage called Irn-Bru and later "Cape Breton's Irn-Bru". It was a brown carbonated soft-drink with a fruity cola taste.

The standard Irn-Bru distributed in Canada also contains the "Not a source of iron" disclaimer on the label. The UK version of the drink (with caffeine) was imported by speciality retailers to Canada, given the large Scottish populations in Canada, with the country accounting for the largest number of Scottish expats in the world.

In 2014, Irn-Bru was incorrectly reported to have been one of a number of imported products, including Marmite, banned in Canada as a result of its additives in its ingredients due to a shipment being confiscated; however, a statement released by the Government of Canada in October 2020 reiterated that "Irn-Bru and Marmite are not banned for sale in Canada. These products have been available on Canadian store shelves for more than a decade and will continue to be sold in stores across Canada. ...Imported products, including Irn Bru and Marmite, that meet Canadian requirements under Canada's Food and Drug Regulations are and will continue to be available for sale in Canada."

=== Middle East ===
Irn-Bru is available throughout the Middle East. It is found mostly in LuLu supermarkets.

=== Europe ===
Irn-Bru entered the Norwegian market in May 2008. They had to withdraw from the market again in 2009 as a result of problems with production agreements and lack of funding for marketing. They were believed to be sponsoring the Norwegian First Division club Mjøndalen IF in 2009. This later turned out to be fraud carried out by a third-party company, and Mjøndalen IF never received any sponsorship from Irn-Bru, even though the team played the 2009 season with the Irn-Bru logo on their shirts. It is available in the Republic of Ireland, increasingly being stocked in BWG and ADM Londis supplied stores, as well as in supermarkets owned by Dunnes Stores and Tesco Ireland. In Ireland generally, the drink mainly sells in County Donegal.

Other European territories where Irn Bru is sold include Spain, the Netherlands, Germany, Gibraltar, Belgium, Poland, Malta, Greece and Cyprus. In September 2010, profits in England and Wales had increased, with half year pre-tax profits rising 18.8% to £16 million. By July 2024, A.G. Barr, the manufacturers of the drink, were estimated to make £221 million in sales in England alone for the first six months (January–June) of 2024, a 7% increase in sales from the previous year.

=== Russia ===
Irn-Bru began being sold in Russia in 1997, and by 2002, it had become their third best selling soft drink. After its original bottler went out of business, a new deal was signed for the drink to be manufactured and distributed in larger quantities by the Pepsi Bottling Group of Russia in 2002. Its popularity has been attributed to the drink's apparent similarity to discontinued Soviet-era soft drinks. As of 2011, Irn-Bru sales in Russia were still growing.

On 4 March 2022, due to the ongoing 2022 Russian invasion of Ukraine, A.G. Barr cut ties with the Russian market.

=== United States ===
Irn-Bru and Diet Irn-Bru have been formulated since 2002 by A.G. Barr to meet the regulations for food colouring of the Food & Drug Administration (FDA). Ponceau 4R, used in the UK formulation, is prohibited by the FDA. Barr uses alternative food and drink colourants manufactured by a US company approved by the FDA. The product labelling also meets US labelling standards on nutritional information and bar code.

== Competitor and generic Iron Brews ==
- Rivets was an iron brew drink launched in 1994 by Meri-Mate Ltd of Dundee.
- Highland Brew was launched in 2000 by the Natural Fruit and Beverage Company.
- Several supermarkets including Aldi, Asda, Lidl and Morrisons sell own brand Iron Brews, alongside the original product made by Barr's.
- Foxon Park Beverages in Connecticut, US, makes its own "Iron Brew" soda, available throughout the New Haven area

== See also ==
- Iron Brew – a similarly named South African soft drink
- List of brand name soft drink products
- List of soft drink flavours
- List of soft drink producers
- List of soft drinks by country
