= Testify (M People album) =

Compilation album by M People
- Released: 25 May 1999
- Genre: House
- Label: Epic
- Producer: M People

M People chronology
The Best of M People (1998)	Testify (1999)	Ultimate Collection (2005)

Singles from Testify
- 1. "Testify" Released: 26 October 1998

Professional ratings
Review scores
Source	Rating
Allmusic	2/5 stars
Robert Christgau	(2-star Honorable Mention)

Testify is a compilation album released only in North America by the British house music band M People. It contains the three new tracks that the band recorded for their British compilation album, The Best of M People, the previous year, and the artwork is taken from the photographs used for that album. However, it contains two album tracks from Fresco and three remixes that originally appeared on The Best of M People's accompanying promotional remix collection in place of the originals.

In addition, four songs are replaced by different edits. It is notable for being the only place that the original versions of "Testify", "What a Fool Believes", the single mix of "Search for the Hero", and the single edits of "Angel St" and "Just for You" are available on vinyl, as its British equivalent was released on CD and cassette only. The version of "What a Fool Believes" is exclusive to this release, since an edit appears on The Best of M People.

== Track listing ==
All songs written by Mike Pickering, Paul Heard and Heather Small except where noted.

No.	Title	Writer(s)	Length
1.	"Testify"		3:58
2.	"Dreaming" (Radio edit)		4:15
3.	"Angel St" (Radio edit)		4:11
4.	"Search for the Hero" (M People Radio mix)	Pickering, Heard	4:09
5.	"What a Fool Believes"	Michael McDonald, Kenny Loggins	5:56
6.	"Fantasy Island"		5:31
7.	"Sight for Sore Eyes" (M People Master mix)		6:11
8.	"Just for You" (Radio edit)		3:59
9.	"Smile"		6:02
10.	"Colour My Life" (Joey Negro's Agoura mix)	Pickering	7:39
11.	"Red Flower Sunset"		4:55
12.	"Moving on Up" (Mark Picchiotti's Millennium vocal remix)	Pickering, Heard	9:00
13.	"How Can I Love You More?" (Jimmy Gomez 6am mix)	Pickering, Heard	10:20

== Release history ==
Region	Date	Label	Format	Catalogue
United States	May 25, 1999	Epic	2xLP	E2 69887
United States	May 25, 1999	Epic	CD	EK 69887
