= Angel St =

Single by M People

from the album Fresco
- Released: 16 March 1998
- Genre: Disco; garage house; techno
- Length: 4.13
- Label: M People Records
- Songwriters: Mike Pickering; Paul Heard; Heather Small
- Producers: M People; Chris Lord-Alge

M People singles chronology
"Fantasy Island" (1997)	"Angel St" (1998)	"Testify" (1998)

Music video
- "Angel St" on YouTube

Alternative cover
- CD2 cover of "Angel St".

"Angel St" (pronounced Angel Street) is the thirteenth single by British band M People, released on 16 March 1998 by M People Records. It was the third and final single from the band's fourth album, Fresco (1997). The song was written by band members Mike Pickering, Paul Heard and Heather Small and produced by M People and Chris Lord-Alge. It peaked at number eight on UK Singles Chart and number 24 on the Eurochart Hot 100. The accompanying music video was filmed on the band's Fresco tour in Manchester, the UK.

== Background ==
Last single "Fantasy Island" despite its nine-week sojourn in the sales chart Top 75, peaked and stalled at number 33 even with above average radio airplay, "Never Mind Love" the mid-temp soulful third track on the album was rumoured to be the third single release, but a more typical sounding single was chosen in the form of seventh track and Fresco live favourite "Angel St". A brand new mix was created by Chris Lord-Alge for the single with lighter sounding synths to support the resounding M People virtues of believing in yourself, respecting yourself but with a leaning towards greater independence.

Special mention must be given to the Later with Jools Holland Special filmed at BBC TV Centre in February 1998 and features the full M People band, helped out with a 10 piece Gospel Choir including regular backing singers, Lynieve Austin, Paul Johnson, and Sarah Brown, a 12-piece String Section as well as Mr Jools Holland himself on piano during the performance of Angel Street itself and later on Don't look any further. They performed some all-time classic M People songs, a couple of lovely acoustic arrangements and one very special cover of Gladys Knight's "Baby Don't Change Your Mind". In the UK, it was screened on BBC2 twice over the Easter Holidays, at 11.30pm on Good Friday and repeated at 6pm on Easter Monday. The Video and DVD of the performance were later sold on general release.

== Composition ==
The single utilises the skills of consistent (unofficial, fifth) band member Snake Davis who opens the songs with a prolonged sax riff lasting seven seconds accompanied by the drums and layers of percussive shakers and a neat underlying rhythm guitar riff, and grand piano played by Terry Burrus who also played on last single, Fantasy Island. Also, the London Session Orchestra provides reinforced orchestral support on the bridge and choruses arranged by Simon Hale. The song very much continues in the familiar vain of Fantasy Island capturing both the signature M People sound and luxuriating in lifting the spirit with pace, drive and eternal messages of the need for both self-reliance and co-operation.

== Critical reception ==
Scottish Aberdeen Press and Journal declared the song as "disco-influenced". AllMusic editor Stephen Thomas Erlewine described it as "garage techno" and named it one of the highlights on the Fresco album. Another editor, Jon O'Brien, called it an "uptempo" stomper. A reviewer from Music Week gave "Angel St" a score of four out of five, naming it one of Fresco's "stand-out moments" and "a vintage M People performance, coupling a pumping radio-friendly dance groove with a trademark Heather Small vocal as powerful and as uplifting as she's ever delivered." Jim Wirth from NME wrote, "Dip into the lyrics, you'll find they're always encouraging - like the sultry stroll down 'Angel Street' where M People tell you, in the nicest possible way, to "stand on your own two feet", because y'know, you're a beautiful person, and really, you put yourself down too often."

== Formats and mixes ==
This single was the third M People single to be available on two CD formats, following "Open Your Heart" and "Love Rendezvous" to ensure strong sales and strengthen the bands chanced of getting their tenth Top 10 hit. Unlike the previous two single CD format releases, all formats were released on the same day. CD1 contains the radio edit and live mixes of "Sight for Sore Eyes", "One Night in Heaven" and "Search for the Hero" which were all recorded from the Fresco Tour the previous autumn (in Glasgow, Manchester and London respectively). CD2 contains both the radio edit and album versions as well as two further mixes: the Joey Negro Extended Disco Mix which is a slice of 70s funk, and 'Genius 3's Out in the Sticks' vocal mix which band member Shovel provides the percussion for.

== Chart performance ==
After the distinct disappointment in the chart performance of "Fantasy Island", the band heavily promoted the single and in the week of release only there were very strong contenders released in the same week including: Destiny's Child's "No, No, No", Robbie Williams's "Let Me Entertain You", and Tin Tin Out's "Here's Where the Story Ends", all vying for top ten chart places with "Angel St". The single entered the chart well within the Top 10 and had been ahead of nearest competitor Tin Tin Out's smash hit for most of the week but had to settle one place behind it at number eight. "Angel St" became M People's tenth and final top ten hit, their second number eight hit from the album and their third number eight single in total, after "How Can I Love You More" and "Just for You".

The single received average support from radio in the UK and the two CD format clearly spurred the single to sell very well in a very strong sales week, with other songs in the Top ten including many former number ones: the Spice Girls' "Stop", Madonna's "Frozen" and Celine Dion's "My Heart Will Go On", but leading atop the chart at the time was 1998's biggest selling single Run DMC's "It's Like That".

"Angel St" sold 74,500 copies to enter the chart and peak at number eight with the live CD (1) selling more than the remixed CD(2). The single then moved very steadily out of the chart in the following weeks from 8 to 15 to 25 to 38 to 46 to 63, so it stayed in the chart for six weeks in total in the Spring of 1998.

== Airplay ==
For the first time since "Excited" in October 1992, some six years prior, and some twelve consecutive singles later, radio seemed quite reluctant to play the single and rotate it. Even lesser charting sales singles, like "Fantasy Island" received more immediate airplay. Generally, radio support for the single grew slowly, despite being serviced to radio in the middle week of January 1998, some eight weeks before release, which is traditionally a very quiet time for single releases. Capital Radio group at first played added to the single to their C-list and it didn't move to tier A-list until a week after release once the single proved itself to be a sales success. Even die hard supporters like BBC Radio 2 made it their Single of the week, in the week of release, but hadn't played it much before. Stations seemed to be wary of the single on the back of the surprise stalling in sales of Fantasy Island.

The single entered on airplay at number 75 four weeks before release moving to 52 to 40 to 21. It then peaked at number 14 the week after their tenth top sales hit placing but only hung around the top twenty for three weeks, making made this single their lowest charting airplay hit since 1992. However, while airplay was relatively slower than normal, the music channels heavily rotated the video particularly VH1, MTV and The Box.

== Artwork ==
The artwork for the single is a stylised photograph of lead singer, Heather Small sat on a backless leather sofa all dressed in black jacket, black trousers, hair flowing over her right shoulder in the direction to which she is smiling and looking with looking glamorous and relaxed with pristine make up. The photograph was taken by Kevyn Aucoin, the very highly in demand American make-up artist and photographer who had worked with hundreds of celebrities including Cher, Janet Jackson and Tina Turner. CD2 is a close-up of half of Heather's face, chest and shoulder as seen from CD1, and you can see even more clearly the flawless make-up on Heather's face. The sleeve was designed by Farrow Design, who had designed both previous singles' sleeves as well as the parent album's sleeve Fresco.

== Music video ==
The music video for "Angel St" was filmed over two days and fully exploits the 'Tour' theme as it was shot at Manchester's Nynex Arena on: 11/12 December 1997, on their Fresco tour and both celebrates and encapsulates the 185,000 people who went to the tour. The opening shot is of the Arena floor, empty and filling up over time-lapse sequencing and Heather and the band are seen performing live on stage and during soundcheck. The band are seen to be very relaxed in rehearsals and Heather sings wearing a long black coat rehearsing the song and the stark contrast between rehearsing and performing live. However, in performance she commands the stage wearing a long pink high cut dress marching across the stage as she sings.

The first opening shots and timelapses are primarily seen through the lens of the stage camera which moves across the front capturing everything from the enjoyment of the crowd to the band clowning around in rehearsals. Other montages of images, capture everything from the band in their hotel lobby at Christmas, to street signs with 'Angel Street' and ones leading to Manchester and backstage antics, meet and greets with fans, to tour bus jokes and much dancing on stage by Heather. The crowd are seen in their thousands within the arena dancing and clapping and singing along with their hands in the air. The montages emphasise how much fun the band have on the road touring, the stage being set up as well as seeing band members Mike Pickering, Paul Heard and Shovel enjoying themselves on stage as well as the other backing singers and members of the live band.

As the video draws to a close, the final clips show the end of the concert and the band waving goodbye as they leave the stage. The closing shots show the crowd disappear and the stage crew packing up on the now empty arena floor.

== Other promotion ==
Apart from the Later with Jools Holland Special show mentioned earlier, they also relentlessly promoted the single on The Des O'Connor Tonight Show, This Morning, Sunday Night at the London Palladium, Videotech, Cilla Black's Surprise Surprise, The Pepsi Chart TV Show and of course, their seventeenth Top of the Pops appearance. The band went on to promote the album in Germany, Sweden, Denmark, Holland and Belgium throughout March and into April 1998.

== Live performances ==
During the Fresco Tour, when this song was premiered, it quickly turned into a new crowd pleaser with its natural sing-along chorus and often opened the show. It very much exploits the musical saxophone talents of Snake Davis who opens the song with a jazzy riff holding the note for an even longer 11 seconds. He also in the middle eight performs the 'battle of the saxes' with Mike Pickering also on sax, when Mike repeats what Snake plays and latterly after the Best of performed 'the battle' with whoever would be playing rhythm guitar. The live version has always stayed pretty faithful to the original with a funkier groove and the additional of rhythm guitar underlying the song throughout; Shovel on percussive duties alternating between playing Bongos and Tambourine, Paul plays chords on second keyboards and Paul Birchall plays first keyboard in place of the grand piano parts originally played by Terry Burrus on the track. The band also premiered the song on UK TV, live on Later with Jools Holland when they were a featured artist in November 1997 promoting the Fresco album and performed other tracks, Never Mind Love and Heather's solo performance of: Perfect Day. They also opened with this song on the Jools Holland M People Special in the spring 1998.

After the Fresco Tour, Angel St has always been played quite early in their set list, but no longer the opener and is very much a warm-up track for bigger singles like One Night in Heaven. The track is also concluded by Snake who plays the song out to a natural end with a closing outro.

== Track listings ==
- Cassette single – 74321 56418 4
1. "Angel St" (Radio Edit) – 4:12
2. "Search for the Hero" (Live) – 5:44
- CD single 1 – 74321 56418 2
1. "Angel St" (Radio Edit) – 4:12
2. "Sight for Sore Eyes" (Live) – 7:32
3. "One Night in Heaven" (Live) – 6:06
4. "Search for the Hero" (Live) – 5:44
- CD single 2 – 74321 56419 2
1. "Angel St" (Radio Edit) – 4:12
2. "Angel St" (Joey Negro's Extended Disco Mix) – 8:45
3. "Angel St" (Genius 3's Out in the Sticks Big Vocal Club Mix) – 7:45
4. "Angel St" (Album Version) – 5:32
- 12–inch single – 74321 56418 1
1. "Angel St" (Joey Negro's Extended Disco Mix) – 8:45
2. "Angel St" (Joey Negro's Funky People Dub) – 8:00

== Charts ==
=== Weekly charts ===
Chart (1998)	Peak position
Australia (ARIA)	178
Croatia (HRT)	4
Europe (Eurochart Hot 100)	24
Germany (GfK)	79
Iceland (Íslenski Listinn Topp 40)	31
Ireland (IRMA)	28
Scotland (OCC)	6
UK Singles (OCC)	8

=== Year-end charts ===
Chart (1998)	Position
UK Singles (OCC)	177
