= Testify (M People song) =

Single by M People

from the album The Best of M People and Testify
- Released: 26 October 1998
- Genre: R&B, soul
- Length: 4:13
- Label: M People Records
- Songwriters: Mike Pickering; Paul Heard; Heather Small
- Producer: M People

M People singles chronology
"Angel St" (1998)	"Testify" (1998)	"Dreaming" (1999)

Music video
- "Testify" on YouTube

Alternative cover
- Cover art of CD2

"Testify" is the eighteenth overall single from British band M People. It is the lead single from their greatest hits albums, The Best of M People and, in North America, Testify. It was written by Mike Pickering, Paul Heard and Heather Small, and produced by M People. The single was released on 26 October 1998 and peaked at number 12 on the UK Singles Chart. It also peaked at number 10 in Scotland and number 66 on the Eurochart Hot 100 in November 1998.

== Critical reception ==
Jose F. Promis from AllMusic called the song "soulful". Chuck Taylor from Billboard complimented Small's "Cher-like diva wailings". Music & Media wrote that it is a "warm, soothing, ballad, which, unsurprisingly, suits Heather Small's voice perfectly. The combination of those distinctive vocals and some well-written material has been the real strength of M People in the past, and it's something which has made the band radio favourites with a broad range of stations across the continent." Wicklow People stated that the song is "delivered with style by the powerful Heather Small."

== Chart performance ==
On physical release, the midweek charts indicated that "Testify" would chart at number 10 and give them their eleventh UK Top 10 single, however, with four higher new Top 10 entries that week, the single would be pushed down to number 12, where it finally entered and peaked on the chart.

== Music video ==
To support the release of this single, the band filmed their most expensively produced video on 10 September 1998 in London and was created with a budget of £750,000 and directed by New Zealand-born Gregory Rood who, had worked with Heather on the Perfect Day promotional video for the BBC and produced by William Oakely for 'Pop @ Paul Weiland', the Music Video division of the Paul Weiland Film Company.

Heather stands in the middle of a forest with snow on the ground singing all alone and all covered up in a Red Riding Hood-style cape only to then reveal as the wind blows, halfway through the song, that she's wearing an eye-catching £250,000 diamond necklace and bodice in the middle of this (computer-generated) arctic wonderland with the snow falling and steam coming out of Heather's mouth as she sings. Meanwhile, in the surrounding blocks of ice, band mates Mike Pickering, Paul Heard and Shovell are all encased and motionless.

== Airplay ==
A week after filming the single was serviced to radio and entered the Airplay chart that first week at 134 moving to 75 to 32 and to number 24. Radio did not pick up the single as fast as previous lead singles, "Just for You" (No. 1), "Sight for Sore Eyes" (No. 2) and "One Night in Heaven" (No. 1). Despite the fact that Capital Radio had A-listed the single, BBC Radio 2 pledged their typical support and made it their "Single of the week". In the week of release the single climber as high as number 14, being the lowest placed M People single on Airplay for six years since "Excited" in 1992. It remained on the airplay chart for eight weeks in total.

== Remixes ==
The success of the single on other charts was down to both D'Influence, Ronin (for the "Big String Remix") and in particular Rae and Christian who really exploited the RnB sound to its fullest and used the extra backing vocalist ad-libs to really form the sound and help the single go top 5 and stand up as a genuine record on the RnB Chart. So much so that it was a top 5 hit on the R&B chart, a much bigger success than on other charts.

== Track listings ==
- Cassette single – 74321 62173 4
- CD single 1 – 74321 62173 2
1. "Testify" (Radio Edit) – 4:01
2. "Angel St" (Live) – 5:20
3. "Last Night 10,000" (Live) – 5:22
- CD single 2 – 74321 62174 2
1. "Testify" (D'Influence Radio Edit) – 3:58
2. "Testify" (Rae & Christian Remix) – 5:32
3. "Testify" (Big String Remix) – 6:08

== Charts ==
Chart (1998–1999)	Peak position
Europe (Eurochart Hot 100)	66
Scotland (Official Charts Company)	10
UK Singles (Official Charts Company)	12
UK R&B (Official Charts Company)	7
US Dance Club Songs (Billboard)	5
