= Bizarre Fruit =

Studio album by M People
- Released: 14 November 1994
- Recorded: April – August 1994
- Studio: Strongroom Studios (London)
- Genres: House; pop
- Length: 57:45
- Label: Deconstruction
- Producer: M People

M People chronology
Elegant Slumming (1993)	Bizarre Fruit (1994)	Bizarre Fruit II (1995)

Alternative cover
- North American cover

Singles from Bizarre Fruit
- 1. "Sight for Sore Eyes" Released: 7 November 1994; 2. "Open Your Heart" Released: 23 January 1995; 3. "Search for the Hero" Released: 12 June 1995; 4. "Love Rendezvous" Released: 2 October 1995

Professional ratings
Initial reviews (in 1995)
Review scores
Source	Rating
Cash Box	(favorable)
Robert Christgau	A−
Entertainment Weekly	A−
The Guardian	(favorable)
Los Angeles Times	2/4 stars
Music & Media	(favorable)
NME	8/10
Record Mirror	3/5 stars
Select	2/5 medals
Smash Hits	3/5 stars
Spin	7/10

Professional ratings
Retrospective reviews (after 1995)
Review scores
Source	Rating
AllMusic	3/5 stars
Encyclopedia of Popular Music	3/5 stars

Bizarre Fruit is the third album by British dance band M People, released on 14 November 1994. It entered the UK Albums Chart at No. 4, spending one year on the chart before an expanded version of the album, Bizarre Fruit II, was released in 1995. The album later rose to a new peak of No. 3. By 1996, the album had sold 1.1 million copies worldwide. The albums Bizarre Fruit and Bizarre Fruit II were certified 5× platinum in the UK for combined sales of 1.5 million.

The album's lead single, "Sight for Sore Eyes", reached No. 6 on the UK Singles Chart. Other singles from the album included and "Search for the Hero" and "Open Your Heart" (both peaking at No. 9), "Love Rendezvous" (No. 32), and "Itchycoo Park" (No. 11) from the re-issued edition. In the US, remixes for the song "Padlock" were supplied to club DJs and appeared as the B-side to the CD maxi single of "Search for the Hero". The track reached No. 13 on the Billboard Dance chart.

== Critical reception ==
AllMusic editor William Cooper stated that Bizarre Fruit is "chock-full of funky house grooves", and Heather Small's "deep, soulful vocals add just the right touch to the mix". He highlighted songs like "Open Your Heart", "Sight for Sore Eyes", "Search for the Hero" and "Precious Pearl". Peter Galvin from Entertainment Weekly viewed the album as a "irrepressible" follow-up to Elegant Slumming, concluding that it "has more than its share of house-quaking grooves." Music & Media wrote, "With its faint echoes of the '70s classic 'Papa Was a Rolling Stone', the song "Sugar Town" reveals some of M People's present influences, while the aptly-named "And Finally..." winds the tempo down and ends the album on a poignant note, with the nearest the band gets to a ballad."

Johnny Dee from NME praised it as "a consistently faultless and pleasing third album — it's obvious the M in their name now stands for 'Maturity'." He added, "It's impossible to see tracks as catchy as "Open Your Heart" and "Padlock" occupying any chart position other than Number One." Brad Beatnik from the Record Mirror Dance Update said "it's not until "Love Rendezvous" and the swing-styled "Precious Pearl" that any real soul creeps in. "Walk Away" is the album's arm-waving epic while the closing "And Finally..." is one of the highlights, a spoken epic of hope for the future." Mark Sutherland from Smash Hits wrote, "Bizarre Fruit is crammed full of "classy", "soulful" workouts like "Sight for Sore Eyes" and "Drive Time" (wonder when that'll be played on the radio?) that are pleasant in the extreme. But there's no sign of the glorious handbag house stompalongs that made the last album such an event."

== Track listing ==
No.	Title	Writer(s)	Length
1.	"Sight for Sore Eyes"	Pickering, Heard, Small	6:12
2.	"Search for the Hero"	Pickering, Heard	6:11
3.	"Open Your Heart"	Pickering, Heard	5:42
4.	"Love Rendezvous"	Pickering, Heard	5:24
5.	"Precious Pearl"	Pickering, Heard	6:04
6.	"Sugar Town"	Pickering, Heard	5:41
7.	"Walk Away"	Pickering, Heard	5:48
8.	"Drive Time"	Pickering, Heard	5:30
9.	"Padlock"	Tamy Smith	6:12
10.	"And Finally..."	Pickering, Heard, Small	5:04
Total length:			57:45

2005 re-release bonus tracks
No.	Title	Writer(s)	Length
11.	"Itchycoo Park"	Marriott, Lane	6:42
12.	"Itchycoo Park" (Morales Classic Club Mix)	Marriott, Lane	7:53

North American bonus track
No.	Title	Length
11.	"Renaissance" (M People Master Mix)	6:30

== Charts ==
=== Weekly charts ===
Chart (1994–1996)	Peak position
Australian Albums (ARIA)	14
Austrian Albums (Ö3 Austria)	28
German Albums (Offizielle Top 100)	30
New Zealand Albums (RMNZ)	4
Scottish Albums (Official Charts)	3
Swiss Albums (Schweizer Hitparade)	29
UK Albums (Official Charts)	3
US Heatseekers Albums (Billboard)	17

=== Year-end charts ===
Chart (1994)	Position
UK Albums (OCC)	25

Chart (1995)	Position
Australian Albums (ARIA)	21
German Albums (Offizielle Top 100)	47
New Zealand Albums (RMNZ)	23
UK Albums (OCC)	19

Chart (1996)	Position
UK Albums (OCC)	14

== Certifications ==
Region	Certification	Certified units/sales
Australia (ARIA)	Platinum	70,000^{^}
Germany (BVMI)	Gold	250,000^{^}
New Zealand (RMNZ)	Platinum	15,000^{^}
United Kingdom (BPI)	5× Platinum	1,500,000^{^}
^{^} Shipments figures based on certification alone.

== Release history ==
Region	Date	Label	Format	Catalogue
United Kingdom	14 November 1994	Deconstruction	LP	74321 24081 1
United Kingdom	14 November 1994	Deconstruction	CD	74321 24081 2
United Kingdom	14 November 1994	Deconstruction	Cassette	74321 24081 4
North America	12 May 1995	Epic	LP	E 67037
North America	12 May 1995	Epic	CD	EK 67037
North America	12 May 1995	Epic	Cassette	ET 67037
United Kingdom	7 March 2005	Sony BMG	CD	
