= Fantasy Island (M People song) =

Single by M People

from the album Fresco
- Released: 24 November 1997
- Genre: House
- Length: 4:08
- Label: M People
- Songwriters: Mike Pickering; Paul Heard; Heather Small
- Producer: M People

M People singles chronology
"Just for You" (1997)	"Fantasy Island" (1997)	"Angel St" (1998)

Music video
- "Fantasy Island" on YouTube

"Fantasy Island" is a song by British band M People, released as the second single from their fourth album, Fresco (1997). It is written by Mike Pickering, Paul Heard and Heather Small, and produced by M People. The song was released on 24 November 1997 on their own label, M People Records, and peaked at number thirty three on the UK Singles Chart. The accompanying music video was directed by Matt Broadley.

== Background ==
The band's previous single, "Just for You", had proved that despite a lengthy break, M People were still very much in demand. Just for You had secured another Top 10 sales chart entry in the UK and five other European countries and a number one airplay hit for three weeks in the UK. The parent album Fresco had already gone platinum (with sales of over 850,000) and had charted at number 2.

Ahead of their sold-out 18 date Fresco Tour, M People's second single was released. "Fantasy Island" is a song relaying the virtues of living and wishing for a utopia. Heather sings of various dream situations where the world gets along, politician speak the truth, there's sunshine and laughter, Muslims are embracing Jews; Love being the message and the word. Very much a song that both proclaims the aspects of life that people dream of but are far removed from the reality, hence the 'fantasy'. It also projects the constant M People mottos of achieving and striving to survive.

The melody line is supported by programmed drumming, insistent synth effects, piano riffs (by pianist Terry Burrus), strings and a strong wind section throughout, supported by a deep moog bass line and subtle 'blowy' synths throughout. Critics of the song stated that the piano and trumpet/saxophone riff used an uncredited sample or that the lyrical content was 'benign and sickly'.

== Promotion ==
Due to tour commitments, the single only received national promotion by the band in the actual week of release, with them appearing on The National Lottery Live Show where Heather first revealed that the big hair (that she had become synonymous with) had disappeared after five years and they also appeared on Phillip Schofield's Talking Telephone Numbers. The video had been also been shown on The Chart Show and Live and Kicking.

== Critical reception ==
AllMusic editor Stephen Thomas Erlewine described the song as "catchy house" and picked it as one of the highlights on the album Fresco.

== Chart performance ==
"Fantasy Island" was released in one of the busiest release weeks of the year with 15 of the top 40 songs being new releases competing with Boyzone, The Verve and Kylie Minogue, to name a few. In the week of release, the song surprised and disappointed most expectations to only chart and stall at number 33, their lowest chart entry since "Someday", their third single six years previously. However, lead singer, Heather Small had scored her first ever number one for the charity single "Perfect Day" as a prominent featured artist in a stella and varied line-up for Children in Need.

Despite the relatively lower sales chart position, the single spent a total of nine weeks on the chart, longer than any of the last five singles since "Sight for Sore Eyes" in 1994. This nine-week sojourn also included the first and only ever re-entry for an M People single when it charted for one week at number 69 after a month being out of the Top 75, finally leaving at the end of February 1998. This was due to instrumental versions of the songs being widely used as soundtracks to promote everything from The Clothes Show and Grandstand to other sports review shows.

"Fantasy Island" number 33 sales chart placing had no massive effect on the fortunes of parent album Fresco's already sizeable sales which meant it hovered between numbers 15 and 20 on the UK Album Chart for eight weeks bring the album closer to 850,000 copies shipped, buoyed on by the sell-out UK Fresco Tour.

== Airplay ==
The single was serviced to radio 1 November 1997, three weeks before physical release., half the length of time that Just for you was serviced to radio. It entered the Airplay chart at number 55 while previous single Just for You still had enormous support charting that week at number 8 following its three-week sojourn atop the chart. Radio was quick to follow up on M People's return and the single soared to 21 the following week to 12 prior to release. It then peaked at number 8 while the single charted at 33, reflecting the same situation as Love Rendezvous from Bizarre Fruit II (1995). Radio support for the song continued despite its lower chart position helping the single to consistently maintain its level of sales.

The single became their 16th consecutive Top 40 hit and their 11th consecutive Top 10 Airplay Hit.

== Music video ==
The music video for "Fantasy Island" was directed by Swedish-based director Matt Broadley. The four main members of the band plus, Sarah Brown and Paul Johnson on backing vocals, and Snake Davis on sax play and sing along to the song on a large rotating platform. Heather dressed in a long yellow dress is in the fore and the band perform around her. As the stage rotates, clouds move around the perimeter and various ethnic minorities and types act out the lyrical content of the song; children are playing, a punk communicates to the wider world on his laptop and various people jump into the clouds and the unknown, while all this goes on, M People continue to rotate like the globe, surrounded by a sky-blue coloured effect and Heather sings with her arms outstretched dancing along to the happy vibe.

== Remixes ==
There were three main remixes that appeared on the single, by New York DJ/producer David Morales, the soulful D'Influence and by UK dance duo M+S with their Epic Club Mix. Also included on the single are the radio edit and album versions.

== Track listings ==
- Cassette single – 74321 54293 4
1. "Fantasy Island" (Radio Edit) – 4:08
2. "Fantasy Island" (D'Influence Dimensional Mix) – 6:55
- CD single – 74321 54293 2
1. "Fantasy Island" (Radio Edit) – 4:08
2. "Fantasy Island" (Def Club Mix) – 10:35
3. "Fantasy Island" (M+S Epic Club Mix) – 8:00
4. "Fantasy Island" (D'Influence Dimensional Mix) – 6:55
5. "Fantasy Island" (Album version) – 5:39
- 12–inch single – 74321 54293 1
1. "Fantasy Island" (Def Club Mix) – 10:35
2. "Fantasy Island" (Album version) – 5:39
3. "Fantasy Island" (M+S Epic Club Mix) – 8:00
4. "Fantasy Island" (D'Influence Dimensional Mix) – 6:55

== Charts ==
Chart (1997)	Peak position
Australia (ARIA)	136
Belgium (Ultratip Bubbling Under Flanders)	15
Europe (Eurochart Hot 100)	63
Germany (Official German Charts)	76
Hungary (Mahasz)	4
Iceland (Íslenski Listinn Topp 40)	38
New Zealand (Recorded Music NZ)	39
Scotland (OCC)	34
UK Singles (OCC)	33
