= Bizarre Fruit II =

Studio album (reissue) by M People
- Released: 27 November 1995
- Recorded: April – August 1994
- Genre: Electronic dance music
- Length: 62:58
- Label: Deconstruction
- Producer: M People

M People chronology
Bizarre Fruit (1994)	Bizarre Fruit II (1995)	Fresco (1997)

Singles from Bizarre Fruit II
- 1. "Itchycoo Park" Released: 13 November 1995

Professional ratings
Review scores
Source	Rating
Music & Media	(favorable)
NME	3/10
Smash Hits	2/5 stars

Bizarre Fruit II is a reissued and expanded version of British band M People's 1994 Bizarre Fruit album, with the single versions of "Search for the Hero" and "Love Rendezvous" in place of the originals, and including the band's cover of the Small Faces' "Itchycoo Park". It was initially released as a limited edition with a bonus Live and Remixed CD or cassette. The Live and Remixed disc contains live versions of tracks from Bizarre Fruit and M People's previous two albums, Northern Soul and Elegant Slumming. The live tracks were recorded at GMEX in Manchester on 16 December 1994, except "Search for the Hero" which was recorded at Grosse Freiheit in Hamburg on 26 February 1995.

Bizarre Fruit II was later released as a single CD replacing the original Bizarre Fruit album. Confusingly, later editions of this single-disc version bear the title Bizarre Fruit, although the cover art remains the same as the initial Bizarre Fruit II release.

== Critical reception ==
Pan-European magazine Music & Media wrote, "The British have a way with mixing dance, funk and soul elements into brand new styles. Like Tricky and Massive Attack, M People have developed their own thang, which is based on stark electronic rhythms and the gloriously soulful vocals of Heather Small. M People have successfully put their hands on the Small Faces' "Itchycoo Park", currently a new entry in the EHR Top 40, but they certainly don't shy away from disco-inspired basslines and rhythm guitars."

== Track listing ==
No.	Title	Writer(s)	Length
1.	"Sight for Sore Eyes"	Pickering, Heard, Heather Small	6:12
2.	"Search for the Hero" (M People Radio Mix)	Pickering, Heard	4:09
3.	"Open Your Heart"	Pickering, Heard,	5:42
4.	"Love Rendezvous" (Master Mix)	Pickering, Heard	5:54
5.	"Itchycoo Park" (M People Master Mix)	Marriott, Lane	6:42
6.	"Precious Pearl"	Pickering, Heard	6:04
7.	"Sugar Town"	Pickering, Heard	5:41
8.	"Walk Away"	Pickering, Heard	5:48
9.	"Drive Time"	Pickering, Heard	5:30
10.	"Padlock"	Tony Smith	6:12
11.	"...and Finally"	Pickering, Heard, Heather Small	5:04
Total length:			62:58

Limited edition bonus disc – Live and Remixed
No.	Title	Writer(s)	Length
1.	"Walk Away" (Live Mix)		5:40
2.	"Search for the Hero" (Live Mix)	Pickering, Heard	5:33
3.	"Colour My Life" (Live Mix)	Pickering	4:43
4.	"Someday" (Live Mix)	Jefferson	5:10
5.	"Moving on Up" (Live Mix)	Pickering, Heard	6:22
6.	"Itchycoo Park" (Morales Classic Club Mix)	Marriott, Lane	7:51
7.	"Search for the Hero" (US Remix)	Pickering, Heard	4:16
8.	"Open Your Heart" (Brothers in Rhythm Soundtrack)	Pickering, Heard	10:13
9.	"Love Rendezvous" (K-Klass Klub Mix)	Pickering, Heard	7:59
10.	"Padlock" (Junior Vasquez Sound Factory Mix)	Tony Smith	10:04
Total length:			67:51

== Release history ==
Region	Date	Label	Format	Catalogue
United Kingdom	27 November 1995	Deconstruction	2xCD	74321 32817 2
United Kingdom	27 November 1995	Deconstruction	2xCassette	74321 32817 4
United Kingdom	1998	Deconstruction	CD	74321 57755 2
