= Dreaming (M People song) =

Single by M People

from the album The Best of M People
- B-side: "Baby Don't Change Your Mind"
- Released: 1 February 1999
- Genre: House
- Length: 4.13
- Label: Deconstruction
- Songwriters: Mike Pickering; Paul Heard; Heather Small
- Producer: M People

M People singles chronology
"Testify" (1998)	"Dreaming" (1999)

Music video
- "Dreaming" on YouTube

Alternative cover
- CD2 cover of "Dreaming".

"Dreaming" is the nineteenth and to date final single from British band M People. It was released on 1 February 1999 as the second single from their first greatest hits album, The Best of M People (1998). The song is written by bandmembers Mike Pickering, Paul Heard and Heather Small, and produced by M People and Chris Lord-Alge. It peaked at number thirteen on the UK Singles Chart.

== Background ==
Following the success of The Best of M People Tour in Autumn 1998 and the number two peak of the album selling over a million copies in three months, the band marked its success with another single, reflecting how to fulfil dream and realise the difference between dreams and reality. The Band took a short break together over the 1998 New Year, before returning to promote the last single to be released from the album: "Dreaming". They had achieved ten UK Top 10 hits and "Testify" had charted at number 12. The band planned to re-edit the song from the album version to give it softer feel, enlisting the help of Chris Lord-Alge who had also re-edited the Fresco single "Angel St".

== Chart performance ==
When released, "Dreaming" sold in excess of 42,000 copies in its first week to enter the chart and peak at number 13, one place below previous single, "Testify". It promptly left the chart falling to number 38, dropping 25 places which is the biggest drop of any M People single week-on-week and its downward trajectory continued moving to No. 58 and then finally No. 71.

== Critical reception ==
Michael Paoletta from Billboard felt the song "overflows with Philly-inspired beats and the soulful wailings of lead singer/diva supreme Heather Small." Music Week wrote that Small "adds restraint to her soaraway vocals on this otherwise trademark, if unremarkable, track from their double platinum Best Of. The track boasted the biggest increase in audience on the UK airplay chart last week." An editor from Wicklow People stated that the song is "delivered with style by the powerful Heather Small."

== Formats and mixes ==
The single was available on two CD formats. CD1 contains the Radio Edit, plus their unique live cover of the Gladys Knight & the Pips 1977 hit "Baby Don't Change Your Mind" recorded at the Jools Holland Special show in February 1998 and also there is an exclusive megamix of M People's biggest singles into a ten-minute montage. CD2 contains the remixes of David Morales and Jimmy Gomez who rendered their services on the 103.5 Radio Edit and the Vocal Mix, respectively. They also issued more remixes which were used on limited edition7" and 12" vinyl promo's issued to DJs.

== Music video ==
The accompanying music video for "Dreaming" was filmed on 14 November 1998, before rehearsals for their The Best of M People Tour that winter, featuring all four members of the band. The opening shot is of Small, standing motionless, holding a cup and wearing a black dress, looking out of an apartment window overlooking Paddington station and she seems to be daydreaming as she then picks up her keys and coat, leaves the flat and goes for a walk. When starting her walk she passes band members, Mike, Paul and Shovell who are sat outside a restaurant. She sees them but they don't notice her. Her long walk continues with flashbacks of people kissing and children playing and this is followed by Heather walking and various locations that are super-imposed behind her, including London's Camden Lock Bridge and pathway, a basement club with people dancing, Docklands, Canada Water and the streets of the City of London. Mike, Paul and Shovell feature occasionally and are seen together throwing paper planes and walking, their scenes are reversed and replayed repeatedly.

By the second chorus, night has fallen and Heather is superimposed walking along London's Old Compton Street, Piccadilly and China Town amongst the bustling nightlife before the middle-eight where is she sings and gestures towards various London Landmark locations that share the screen with her, including Tower Bridge, The River Thames, St Paul's Cathedral and the HSBC Tower, London.

In the final bridge, Heather's image is superimposed on shimmery water and the shots quicken in pace and irregularity as the song progresses; fast forwarding and rewinding and changing from colour to black and white with unsteady movements. The video ends in the same way it began with Heather day dreaming out of the window overlooking Paddington Station in the sunlight, motionless.

== Artwork ==
The artwork of the CD single is another photo derived from The Best of M People photo shoot that features Heather in the forefront of the picture smiling in a white vest top and black trousers, while the Shovel, Mike and Paul are chatting to each other behind her. CD1 has a brown border (see banner above CD2 has a sky blue border. The CD promo cover is a blurred picture of the band pictured together from the same shoot but in a line facing the camera in medium/close-up shot.

== Track listings ==
- UK Cassette single – 74321 64535 4
- UK CD single 1 – 74321 64535 2
1. "Dreaming" (Radio Edit) – 4:18
2. "Baby Don't Change Your Mind" (Live) – 3:26
3. "The Best of M People Megamix" – 10:52
- UK CD single 2 – 74321 64536 2
1. "Dreaming" (Radio Edit) – 4:18
2. "Dreaming" (Morales 103.5 Remix) – 6:07
3. "Dreaming" (Jimmy Gomez Vocal Remix) – 9:14
- EU CD maxi-single – 74321 65296 2
1. "Dreaming" (Radio Edit) – 4:18
2. "Dreaming" (Morales Radio Edit) – 3:33
3. "Dreaming" (Jimmy Gomez Vocal Remix) – 9:14
4. "Baby Don't Change Your Mind" (Live) – 3:26
5. "One Night in Heaven" (Sharp "Ballroom" Mix) – 7:33

== Charts ==
Chart (1999)	Peak position
Europe (Eurochart Hot 100)	56
Scotland (OCC)	12
UK Singles (OCC)	13
