= Sight for Sore Eyes =

1994 single by M People

Single by M People

from the album Bizarre Fruit
- Released: 7 November 1994
- Recorded: 1994
- Genre: House; gospel
- Length: 3:57
- Label: Deconstruction
- Songwriters: Mike Pickering; Paul Heard; Heather Small
- Producer: M People

M People singles chronology
"Renaissance" (1994)	"Sight for Sore Eyes" (1994)	"Open Your Heart" (1995)

Music video
- "Sight for Sore Eyes" on YouTube

"Sight for Sore Eyes" is the tenth overall single from British band M People from their third album, Bizarre Fruit (1994). Written by band members Mike Pickering, Paul Heard and Heather Small, and produced by M People, it was released as the album's lead single on 7 November 1994, by Deconstruction Records. The song peaked at number six on the UK Singles Chart and number four on the UK Dance Singles Chart, becoming the band's sixth consecutive single to enter the UK top 10. The accompanying music video was directed by British photographer and director Terence Donovan and filmed in London.

== Background ==
The band had scored four consecutive top-10 singles from the previous album, Elegant Slumming, and toured the UK and Europe twice, but throughout mid-1994, they worked quickly to record new album Bizarre Fruit, for which "Sight for Sore Eyes" was the first single.

== Composition ==
The song was recorded at the Roundhouse in Chalk Farm, London. The song starts with a gospel-esque 'harmonised' warm-up by the backing vocalists accompanied with a building piano with lead vocals by the unmistakable voice of Heather Small. The key refrain #"Ain't love, ain't love, ain't love a surprise"# is bellowed by Heather and then other key elements are introduced, most notably synths and a subtle allegro acenato (quick and accentuated) piano movement during the verses with Small's vocals more prominent than on previous singles. In the chorus breaks, an Italo house style chord progression and sequenced bleeps granuliser synths lead up to the verses. Like "One Night in Heaven", the melody line is guided by the deep Moog bass line, programmed drumming, percussion drumming and layered hi-hat synths and a four-to-the-floor house beat. This is underlined by subtle strings and big chords during the actual choruses. The Italo house style is most punctuated during the middle-eight piano-break.

== Chart performance ==
"Sight for Sore Eyes" became the band's sixth consecutive single to enter the UK top 10. It entered the chart at number eight and following club play and performances on British television, most notably Top of the Pops, saw an increase in sales to then peak in its second week at number six. The single spent three weeks in the top 10 and nine weeks on the chart overall, leaving in early January 1995.

== Critical reception ==
AllMusic editor William Cooper found that the song has a "grandiose gospel-influenced intro before kicking into the funky groove", noting that the melody is similar to Technotronic's 'Pump Up the Jam'. Upon the release, Larry Flick from Billboard magazine felt it "kicks off the set with a rubbery, houserooted bassline, coated with a rolling piano line that is spiced with a tangy salsa twist. The usually haughty and controlled Small anchors the cut with a performance that pleasantly surprises with its playful tone." Kendall Morgan from Dallas Morning News concluded that "diva Heather Small has quite a voice", and shows it off in "the big ol' gospel sound". In his weekly UK chart commentary, James Masterton wrote, "Their first new hit single for over a year is in many ways something of a disappointment, albeit one that grows on you gradually." Pan-European magazine Music & Media said it is "instantly-recognisable". Alan Jones from Music Week gave it a score of four out of five, adding, "This is a sturdy, bass-heavy house workout, with chiming synth strings and typical piano chords. Obviously one for the upper echelons." Johnny Dee from NME felt it "is indictive of the new M People, less immediate than of yore", noting that Small "doesn't belt out the chorus as if she was celebrating world peace but with a confidence that she no longer needs to impress". Another NME editor, Paul Moody, named it "M People's best happy house moment".

A.D. Amorosi from The Philadelphia Inquirer stated, "Like Joan Armatrading with a dab of Sarah Vaughn's sassiness, Small imbues the hookdriven 'Sight for Sore Eyes' and 'Drive' with a maturity that gives them sultry heft." Brad Beatnik from the Record Mirror Dance Update wrote, "Naturally, this one's packed with pop hooks but there's enough of a groove to whip up dancefloor frenzy in the house clubs". Another Record Mirror editor, James Hamilton, named it a "superb bouncily strutting steady loper" in his weekly dance column. A reviewer from Sarasota Herald-Tribune noted that the singer "delivers each song with the sort of soulful confidence that suggests passion without smothering the melody, an approach that underscores the pop appeal of tunes like 'Sight for Sore Eyes'". Wayne Bledsoe from Scripps Howard wrote that the band "add astral production flourishes to the comping keyboard that pushes the tune before detouring into a delightful salsa-style interlude." He complimented Small's "buoyant release of pent-up romance". Andrew Harrison from Select viewed it as "brazenly Gucci'd-up". Pete Stanton from Smash Hits also gave it four out of five, describing it as a "hot funky dance tune". He added, "It's 'Moving On Up', it's 'One Night in Heaven', it's everything they've done before. Wow!"

== Airplay ==
"Sight for Sore Eyes" was serviced to radio five weeks before its commercial release on 1 October. The single was added to radio playlists quickly, with most airplay coming from stations in the Capital Radio group, Galaxy and BBC Radio 1, who all placed the song on their A-List or as Single of the Week. By the end of its first week of airplay, the single had become the highest new entry being played 539 times on UK radio, placing it at number 45.

The single subsequently climbed from 45 to 31 to 19 to nine in the week before its commercial release. The song then peaked at number three at airplay for two weeks and stayed in the top 10 for another three weeks. It then took another ten weeks to leave the Airplay Top 75, and was still being played when its successor "Open Your Heart" was released to radio. This had only happened once before with "One Night in Heaven" and "Moving on Up" and would happen again with future singles "Just for You" and "Fantasy Island".

== Music video ==
The music video for "Sight for Sore Eyes" features the four main members of the band performing the song throughout, with Andy Gangadeen on drums, Paul Johnson and Lynieve Austin on backing vocals. Within the studio, there are two main colour themes, red and blue. The opening shot features empty cars leaned up against each other and twelve people dressed in dark mechanic overalls with their backs facing the camera all dancing against the cars in the background. Heather is then shown dancing happily, surrounded by Mike Pickering on guitar, Paul Heard on first and second keyboard and Shovell on bongos.

To incorporate the overall metal theme of the new album, there are cutaways of sparks flying as metalwork is carried out, with mechanics and close-ups of booted-feet dancing to the music. The video was filmed entirely in a North London studio by British photographer and film director Terence Donovan, and filmed in one day on 29 September 1994. Donovan had taken several promotional photos of the band for merchandise and tours between 1994–1996 and was considered a good friend of the band. They dedicated their next album Fresco (1997) to him following his untimely death. "Sight for Sore Eyes" received "break out" rotation on MTV Europe in December 1994. Later, in January 1995, it was B-listed on French music television channel MCM.

== Live performances ==
"Sight for Sore Eyes" has become one of the band's fan favourites, alongside "One Night in Heaven", "Moving on Up" and "Search for the Hero". During the Bizarre Fruit and Bizarre Fruit II tours as well as T in the Park in 1995, the song was played with additional percussion obligato by Shovell in the middle-eight break to add to the Italo house style. Some additional rhythm guitar and saxophone ad-libs are also played throughout.

== Remixes and B-side ==
At the time of release only one remix of the single was readily available by the Hed Boys and their 'Post Op' Mix. The E-Smoove Mix became a significant dance club hit but was not made available for general issue until it featured on CD2 of successor single "Open Your Heart" nearly three months later. The B-side is album track "Sugartown", a funk soul song.

== Track listings ==
- Cassette single – 74321 24547 4
- 7–inch single – 74321 24547 7
1. "Sight for Sore Eyes" (Radio Mix) – 3:56
2. "Sugartown" – 4:35
- 12–inch single – 74321 24547 1
1. "Sight for Sore Eyes" (Master Mix) – 6:12
2. "Sugartown" – 4:35
3. "Sight for Sore Eyes" (Hed Boys Post-Op Mix) – 10:11
- CD single – 74321 24547 2
1. "Sight for Sore Eyes" (Radio Mix) – 3:56
2. "Sight for Sore Eyes" (Master Mix) – 6:12
3. "Sight for Sore Eyes" (Hed Boys Post-Op Mix) – 10:11
4. "Sugartown" – 4:35

== Charts ==
=== Weekly charts ===
Chart (1994)	Peak position
Australia (ARIA)	20
Belgium (Ultratop 50 Flanders)	31
Belgium (VRT Top 30 Flanders)	24
Europe (Eurochart Hot 100)	17
Europe (European AC Radio)	9
Europe (European Dance Radio)	5
Europe (European Hit Radio)	3
Finland (Suomen virallinen lista)	8
Germany (GfK)	57
Iceland (Íslenski Listinn Topp 40)	32
Ireland (IRMA)	13
Israel (Israeli Singles Chart)	24
Netherlands (Dutch Top 40 Tipparade)	5
Netherlands (Dutch Single Tip)	5
New Zealand (Recorded Music NZ)	17
Scotland (OCC)	4
UK Singles (OCC)	6
UK Dance (OCC)	4
UK R&B (OCC)	1
UK Airplay (Music Week)	2
UK Club Chart (Music Week)	6

=== Year-end charts ===
Chart (1994–1995)	Position
UK Singles (OCC)	82
UK Airplay (Music Week)	47
UK Club Chart (Music Week)	100
