= Love Is Always There =

"Love Is Always There" may refer to:

- "Love Is Always There", a song by Heather Small from Close to a Miracle, 2006
- "Love Is Always There", a song by Carolyn Arends from I Can Hear You, 1995
- "Love Is Always There", song by Majid Jordan from Majid Jordan, 2016

== See also ==
- There Is Always Love, a book by Emilie Baker Loring, 1940
