= Proud (Heather Small album) =

Studio album by Heather Small
- Released: 1 June 2000
- Studio: Abbey Road, Angel, Area 21, Britannia Row, Olympic, Ten Forward, Town House, Metropolis, Whitfield Street (London, England), Mulinetti (Genoa, Italy)
- Length: 54:54
- Label: Arista
- Producer: Peter-John Vettese; Simon Climie; Steve DuBerry; Ollie Marland

Heather Small chronology
Proud (2000)	Ultimate Collection (2005)

Singles from Proud
- 1. "Proud" Released: 23 May 2000; 2. "Holding On" Released: 7 August 2000; 3. "You Need Love Like I Do" Released: 6 November 2000

Proud is the debut solo album by English singer Heather Small. It was released on 1 June 2000 by Arista Records. Her first solo project following the hiatus of her band M People, it reached number twelve on the UK Albums Chart and earned a Best UK Album nomination at the 2000 MOBO Awards. Proud's title track was released as the first single and became a hit, followed by second single "Holding On."

== Critical reception ==
Professional ratings
Review scores
Source	Rating
New Zealand Herald	2/5 stars
Sunday Herald	3/5 stars

Colm O'Hare from Hot Press praised Proud, describing the album as a largely familiar extension of her previous work, with dancefloor tracks such as "Proud" and "Holding On" alongside big ballads like "Ease Your Troubled Mind," while praising Small’s vocals but suggesting the production and vocal intensity could become excessive. The album received a Best UK Album nomination at the 2000 MOBO Awards.

== Commercial performance ==
Proud achieved moderate commercial performance following its release in 2000. The album peaked at number 12 on the UK Albums Chart and also reached number 12 on the Scottish Albums Chart. Internationally, it charted at number 36 in New Zealand, number 62 in Germany, and number 81 in Switzerland. In the United Kingdom, Proud was certified Silver by the British Phonographic Industry (BPI) in July 2013 for shipments figures of over 60,000 units.

== Track listing ==
Proud track listing
No.	Title	Writer(s)	Length
1.	"Proud"	Heather Small; Peter-John Vettese	4:29
2.	"Holding On"	Small; Vettese	4:30
3.	"Wherever the Road Goes"	Small; Steve Booker	3:48
4.	"Don't Look for Love"	Small; Simon Climie	4:19
5.	"Ease Your Troubled Mind"	Small; Climie	4:23
6.	"Change Your World"	Small; Ollie Marland	4:10
7.	"Garden of Eden"	Small; Vettese	4:54
8.	"Don't Change a Thing"	Small; Booker	5:51
9.	"I've Been There"	Small; Booker; Robin Lerner	5:03
10.	"I Know Who I Am"	Small; Steve DuBerry	4:59
11.	"Afraid"	Small; Vettese	4:16
12.	"What Do I Have?"	Small; Climie	4:12

Japanese bonus tracks
No.	Title	Writer(s)	Length
13.	"Don't Give Up the Fight"	Small; Danny Schogger	3:16
14.	"Holding On" (Metro Mix)	Small; Vettese	4:04

2002 re-release bonus track
No.	Title	Writer(s)	Length
13.	"You Need Love Like I Do" (with Tom Jones; from Reload)	Barrett Strong; Norman Whitfield	3:24

== Charts ==
Weekly chart performance for Proud
Chart (2000)	Peak position
German Albums (Offizielle Top 100)	62
New Zealand Albums (RMNZ)	36
Scottish Albums (OCC)	12
Swiss Albums (Schweizer Hitparade)	81
UK Albums (OCC)	12

== Certifications ==
Certifications of Proud
Region	Certification	Certified units/sales
United Kingdom (BPI)	Silver	60,000^{^}
^{*} Sales figures based on certification alone.^{^} Shipments figures based on certification alone.
