= Renaissance (M People song) =

1994 single by M People

Single by M People

from the album Elegant Slumming
- Released: 28 February 1994
- Genre: House
- Length: 3:57
- Label: Deconstruction
- Songwriters: Mike Pickering; Paul Heard
- Producer: M People

M People singles chronology
| "Don't Look Any Further" (1993) | "Renaissance" (1994) | "Sight for Sore Eyes" (1994) |

Music video
- "Renaissance" on YouTube

"Renaissance" is a song by British electronic group M People, released on 28 February 1994, by Deconstruction Records, as the fourth and final single from their second album, Elegant Slumming (1994). In Australia, it was released as the third single from the album. It was written by group members Mike Pickering and Paul Heard and produced by M People. The song peaked at number five on the UK Singles Chart as well as number eight in Ireland following the band's first win for Best British Dance Act at the 1994 BRIT Awards. The accompanying music video was directed by Jeff Baynes and filmed in San Francisco, the US. Remixes of the single were provided by Roger S., Macready, Da Silva and John Digweed and M People themselves who also included the original Album mix of the single alongside the Radio Edit and Master Mix.

== Background ==
At the time of "Renaissance"'s release, M People were touring the second leg of their 15-date Elegant Slumming UK Tour and riding the height of their musical fortunes with their double platinum album. "How Can I Love You More (Mixes)", "One Night in Heaven", "Moving on Up" and "Don't Look Any Further" had already provided them with four consecutive singles and this became their fifth, as well as their second and final top five.

== Composition ==
The song features pounding italo-piano chords and is laden with synths alongside an insistent bassline and classic house beat. Lyrically, it is in total contrast to the angry "breaking free" sung in "Moving on Up" to looking forward to coming home to one glorious night when singer Heather Small promises to "make you scream aloud with joy" – but "there'll be no day there'll be no night".

== Critical reception ==
Irish Evening Herald noted the "thudding pulse" of the song. Ben Thompson from The Independent described it as a "very spirited" and "potential single". Kingston Informer named it "a happening tune from a band who can do no wrong at the moment." Howard Cohen from The Miami Herald complimented its "steady drum kick, pumping bass and trance-like beat". Pan-European magazine Music & Media wrote, "The pineapple-shaped hairdo of Heather Small is the eyecatcher in the videos, and her massive voice the focal point for the ears, enjoying a renaissance of '70s disco." Andy Beevers from Music Week gave it a top score of five out of five and named it Pick of the Week in the category of Dance, saying, "It looks certain to be another big hit". He noted that "this piano-powered track, with its catchy "I'm coming home" hook, will be instantly familiar to many as the theme for the student documentary, The Living Soap." James Hamilton from the Record Mirror Dance Update named it a "I'm coming home nagger" in his weekly dance column.

== Chart performance ==
Out of the nine M People previous single releases at that point, this single was only the second to chart and peak in its first week (the only other single to do so at that point was predecessor "Don't Look Any Further"). "Renaissance" entered the chart and peaked in its first week at number five with sales of 89,000 copies in its first week, but made a steady descent out of the chart within seven weeks. When "Renaissance" left the chart, it had sold in total 179,000 copies. In the two weeks prior to "Renaissance"'s release, Elegant Slumming climbed back into the Top Ten at eight climbing to six once the song had been released, then rising further once again to peak at number four weeks later. For the second time, M People recorded simultaneous single and album Top 10s for two weeks, being at numbers five and six respectively and at six and five respectively the week after in March 1994. "Renaissance" was also used as the theme tune to the BBC2 show The Living Soap which helped the single sales.

== Music video ==
The music video for "Renaissance" was filmed in San Francisco in January 1994 while the band promoted the launch of the US version of the album on the Sony label. Directed by Award winning Director of Photography Jeff Baynes for 'Eye Eye Ltd'/'Tatooist International' Production companies; Heather, Mike, Paul and Shovell were filmed together during the choruses with Heather in the driving seat of a classic black convertible American Cadillac with her bandmates as passengers all singing along or in a variety of places such riding in a classic Jag with Heather in the driving seat around the bustling American streets, driving past trams, and along a freeway. Heather has since admitted that at the time she was not qualified to drive and kept turning the wheel in the wrong direction. Other notable landmarks seen include the Park Bowl and Xing seen on the road. There are also some internal scenes in a studio with Heather dancing and singing to camera with her three bandmates dancing behind her. There are also close-ups on Paul's hands playing chords on the piano and Shovell's drumming.

== Live performances ==
Since its release, M People have continued to perform this song as their show opener for all their tours to this day, and the refrain "I'm coming..." is what Heather sings off-stage before making her entrance to the instrumental.

== Airplay ==
"Renaissance" was serviced to radio three weeks before physical release when "Don't Look Any Further" was still in the Airplay Top 30 from two months earlier. It entered the Top 50 at number 45 then moved up 26 places in its second week to number 19, finally peaking at number 6. The new instrumental, tighter verses and stronger structure plus its use as a theme tune of a popular BBC show, The Living Soap, all propelled the song's success very quickly. "Renaissance" has the distinction of being the only ever M People single to be written and recorded in just one day. This was partly because the band were under pressure from their record label, DeConstruction, to have finished and finalised the album by the end of the Summer 1993. Therefore, the tweaking of the track was essential to become a carefree dance single.

== Track listings ==
- Cassette single – 74321 19413 4
- 7" single – 74321 19413 7
1. "Renaissance" (Radio Mix) – 3:39
2. "Renaissance" (Album Mix) – 5:20
- 12" single – 74321 19413 1
1. "Renaissance" (M People Master Mix) – 6:30
2. "Renaissance" (Roger S Uplifting Club Mix) – 7:01
3. "Renaissance" (John Digweed's Full On Mix) – 8:49
4. "Renaissance" (Macsilva Mix) – 8:08
- CD single – 74321 19413 2
1. "Renaissance" (Radio Mix) – 3:39
2. "Renaissance" (M People Master Mix) – 6:30
3. "Renaissance" (John Digweed's Full On Mix) – 8:49
4. "Renaissance" (Roger S Uplifting Club Mix) – 7:01
5. "Renaissance" (Macsilva Mix) – 8:08
6. "Renaissance" (Album Mix) – 5:20

== Charts ==
=== Weekly charts ===
| Chart (1994) | Peak position |
|---|---|
| Australia (ARIA) | 60 |
| Belgium (Ultratop 50 Flanders) | 26 |
| Europe (Eurochart Hot 100) | 17 |
| Europe (European Dance Radio) | 20 |
| Europe (European Hit Radio) | 23 |
| Finland (Suomen virallinen lista) | 16 |
| Germany (GfK) | 83 |
| Iceland (Íslenski Listinn Topp 40) | 19 |
| Ireland (IRMA) | 8 |
| Israel (Israeli Singles Chart) | 12 |
| Netherlands (Dutch Single Tip) | 9 |
| New Zealand (Recorded Music NZ) | 27 |
| Scotland (OCC) | 8 |
| UK Singles (Official Charts) | 5 |
| UK Airplay (Music Week) | 2 |
| UK Dance (Music Week) | 2 |
| UK Club Chart (Music Week) | 3 |

=== Year-end charts ===
| Chart (1994) | Position |
|---|---|
| UK Singles (OCC) | 105 |
| UK Airplay (Music Week) | 32 |
| UK Club Chart (Music Week) | 39 |
