= Proud (Heather Small song) =

2000 single by Heather Small

Single by Heather Small

from the album Proud
- B-side: "Don't Give Up the Fight"; "Wonderful World"
- Released: 8 May 2000
- Length: 4:29
- Label: Arista
- Songwriters: Heather Small; Peter-John Vettese
- Producers: Peter-John Vettese; Simon Climie; Steve DuBerry; Ollie Marland

Heather Small singles chronology
"Proud" (2000)	"Holding On" (2000)

Alternative cover
- Cover art of the 2005 release.

Audio sample
- file; help

Music videos
- "Proud" on YouTube; "Proud" (2005) on YouTube

"Proud" is the debut solo single by M People singer Heather Small, released on 8 May 2000. It was co-written with and produced by Peter-John Vettese, and is the title track of her debut album Proud. The song peaked at number 16 on the UK Singles Chart.

== Track listings ==
- UK Cassette single – 74321 75711 4
- EU CD single 1 – 74321 75932 2
1. "Proud" (Edit) – 3:54
2. "Don't Give Up the Fight" – 3:16
- UK CD single – 74321 75711 2
1. "Proud" (Edit) – 3:54
2. "Don't Give Up the Fight" – 3:16
3. "Wonderful World" – 3:39
4. "Proud" (Enhanced Music Video) – 3:54
- EU CD single 2 – 74321 79299 2
1. "Proud" (Edit) – 3:54
2. "Proud" (Suli and Stef Remix) – 4:02

== Charts ==
Chart (2000)	Peak position
Australia (ARIA)	173
Croatia (HRT)	9
Europe (Eurochart Hot 100)	72
Germany (GfK)	92
Scotland Singles (OCC)	11
Switzerland (Schweizer Hitparade)	83
UK Singles (OCC)	16
UK Hip Hop/R&B (OCC)	5

Chart (2005)	Peak position
Scotland Singles (OCC)	39
UK Singles (OCC)	33

Chart (2023)	Peak position
UK Singles Downloads	3

== Certifications ==
Region	Certification	Certified units/sales
United Kingdom (BPI)	Gold	400,000^{‡}
^{‡} Sales+streaming figures based on certification alone.

== In popular culture ==
In 2000, the song was used in the closing montage of the BBC's coverage of the 2000 Summer Olympics. Five years later, it was adopted as the official theme for the London 2012 Olympic bid, and was featured in a widely seen promotional video for the bid. Re-released in honour of this, and due to the fact a new M People greatest hits album titled Ultimate Collection, which also included two of Small's solo songs, was released the same year, the song returned to the UK Singles Chart, peaking at number 33 and remained in the Top 75 for two more weeks.

In 2009, almost a decade after the song was first released, it gained new popularity thanks to the hit BBC sitcom Miranda, written by and starring Miranda Hart. The song was a source of one of the show’s most frequent running gags, whereby Miranda's best friend and colleague, Stevie Sutton (played by Sarah Hadland) would sing the song's chorus in the style of Small's voice as a motivational chant, while holding a cardboard cutout of Small on a wooden stick. Small herself subsequently appeared in a special sketch with the Miranda cast for Comic Relief in 2011 for Red Nose Day, and also sang "Proud" at the climax of the show’s last ever episode, "The Final Curtain", aired on New Year's Day in 2015.

It was also used as the theme for seasons 2-9 of "The Biggest Loser" on NBC.
