= Open Your Heart (M People song) =

1995 single by M People

- Standard artwork for worldwide release

Single by M People

from the album Bizarre Fruit
- Released: 23 January 1995
- Genre: House
- Length: 3:41
- Label: Deconstruction
- Songwriters: Mike Pickering; Paul Heard
- Producer: M People

M People singles chronology
"Sight for Sore Eyes" (1994)	"Open Your Heart" (1995)	"Search for the Hero" (1995)

Music video
- "Open Your Heart" on YouTube

"Open Your Heart" is a song by British band M People, released in January 1995 by Deconstruction Records as the second single from their third album, Bizarre Fruit (1994). The song was written by bandmembers Mike Pickering and Paul Heard, and produced by the band. Upon its release, "Open Your Heart" was acclaimed by music critics, whom praised its dance production and Heather Small's diva-like vocal performance. The single peaked at number nine on the UK Singles Chart, and was a top-10 hit also in Finland and Scotland. In the US, it reached number one on the Billboard Dance Club Play chart. The accompanying music video for the song was directed by Jordan Feldman, featuring the band performing in an elevator, watching clubbers come in and out of the sliding doors.

== Background and release ==
M People released this single in a slight reshuffle, as "Search for the Hero" was meant to be the second single but the band were re-editing the Bizarre Fruit version to a more radio friendly edit so "Open Your Heart" was released instead. The band had been on holiday together over the New Year break in Grenada, while dance mixes of this single had been released early and on UK radio, Pete Tong had been rotating several mixes on BBC Radio 1.

"Open Your Heart" was the first M People single to be available on two CD formats. CD1 was released on 23 January 1995 while CD2 was released on 30 January 1995 along with a 12-inch single and a cassette single. In Australia, a CD and cassette were issued on 27 February 1995. Two months later, on 25 April, the song was serviced to contemporary hit radio in the United States.

== Critical reception ==
William Cooper from AllMusic noted that the song has an "obvious dance appeal" and a "touch of '70s R&B in the mix". Another AllMusic editor, Jon O'Brien, named it an "uptempo" stomper. Larry Flick from Billboard magazine constated that it "has already won the hearts of M People die-hards at club level, and it sports a hook that takes up instant residence in the brain upon impact." He wrote, "Maestros Mike Pickering and Paul Heard blur, with notable finesse, the timeline dividing current house music trends and vintage Philly soul, while singer Heather Small continues to evolve into a smoky-voiced diva who may remind some of a club-minded Anita Baker. Smashing." Geir Rakvaag from Norwegian Dagsavisen praised it as "heavenly". Kendall Morgan from Dallas Morning News felt that "she's the most fun when she's belting out guidance to a lover". In his weekly UK chart commentary, James Masterton wrote that it "appears to be doing little more than recycling a formula, making for a hit that is doubtless well produced and immaculately performed yet is somehow rather tedious." Howard Cohen from The Miami Herald wrote, "Just try shaking the hook of the infectious first single, 'Open Up Your Heart', once its simple, call-to-the-dancefloor keyboard riff opens the drum- and bass-heavy tune." Pan-European magazine Music & Media said that Bizarre Fruit "is the album title, not forbidden fruit. So take a bite of it Continentals, there's no risk of being banned from paradise. Their best since 'Moving On Up'."

Tim Jeffery from Music Week's RM Dance Update deemed it "a rather bland album track", "but this is M People and the familiar vocal style and crisp production are certainly enough to carry this track up the club and pop charts." Another RM editor, James Hamilton, named it a "typically facile foghorn gurgled canterer". Johnny Dee from NME wrote, "It's impossible to see tracks as catchy as 'Open Your Heart' and 'Padlock' occupying any chart position other than Number One." People Magazine noted the "classic good hooks" of the track and Small's "booming alto [which] is hard to shake and, like her pineapple-shaped coif, impossible to ignore." Sarasota Herald-Tribune described it as "bass-bombing". Wayne Bledsoe from Scripps Howard felt it "has Small storming out of the mix with Patti LaBelle-like authority". Andrew Harrison from Select deemed it a "severe disco pounder". Mark Sutherland from Smash Hits gave it three out of five, writing, "And, sure enough, 'Open Your Heart' is an almighty disco stomper that widdles all over Loveland for the top of a ladder on the roof of the Empire State Building." Charles Aaron from Spin said about 'Open Your Heart'/'Search for the Hero', that "this British disco collective is just a more conventional version of Ten City, but their thumping anthems give you a lift over a scenic bridge to a homey chorus that opens up like a window shade on a sunny day."

== Chart performance ==
In the UK, the single entered the UK Singles Chart outside the top 10 at number 11, but ever growing airplay and the release of the exclusive second CD meant that sales surged from 63,000 copies in its first week to 78,000 copies in its second. The single climbed from number 11 into the top 10 at number nine where it peaked, providing the band with their seventh consecutive top-10 hit in just two years since the release of "How Can I Love You More". It spent in total four weeks in the top 10 and a total seven weeks on the Singles Chart.

The Bizarre Fruit album also underwent a resurgence in sales, re-entering the Album Chart top 10 at number eight, so the band once again recorded simultaneous single and album top 10s, being at numbers nine and eight, respectively in the first week of February 1995 like the last two singles. It also became M People's second single to top the US Billboard Dance Club Play chart in May 1995. In West Asia, it became a top-30 hit in Israel, peaking at number thirty on 14 February 1995. In Oceania, it also became a top-30 hit in both Australia and New Zealand, peaking at numbers 25 and 21, respectively.

== Airplay ==
Generally, radio support for the single grew relatively slowly, despite being serviced to radio in the first week of 1995, which is traditionally a very quiet time for single releases. Also predecessor "Sight for Sore Eyes" had remained in the airplay top 20 three months after entering. In the three weeks prior to airplay the single entered the chart at No. 195, scaling to number 35 and then moving to number 19. Only after physical release did the single enter the Airplay top 10 and peak at number five.

"Sight for Sore Eyes" re-entered the Airplay 20 at number 20 when "Open Your Heart" peaked, and so for the first and only time, M People had two singles in the UK Airplay top 20.

The single stayed in the chart for 13 weeks but peaked lower than any of the other Bizarre Fruit singles; "Sight for Sore Eyes": number two, "Search for the Hero": number one, "Love Rendezvous": number four and "Itchycoo Park": number three.

== Music video ==
The music video for "Open Your Heart" was filmed over two days: 25/26 November 1994, before the Bizarre Fruit tour kicked off and was the most expensive video done to that point. Directed by Jordan Feldman and produced by Matthew Amos, this more adventurous offering showed the band in an elevator moving between floors and watching clubbers come in and out of the sliding doors exiting onto another dancefloor. Band members Mike Pickering, Paul Heard, and Shovell are in amongst the crowd dancing while Heather stands still singing in a red Oriental-style dress on the other side of the viewing glass, as people dance around her and then leave or even disappear as quickly as they arrived. As the video continues, the camera is continuously panning from right to left encircling the body of the elevator moving from the front where people can be seen dancing to the back where the mechanisms in the lift shaft can be seen.

== Live performances ==
The band also performed this song in a stripped down acoustic version on various occasions, most notably when they performed their M People special with Jools Holland in March 1998.

== Other promotion ==
With two dance singles lifted off Bizarre Fruit and a European Tour beckoning, M People were nominated for the category Best British Dance Act at the 1995 Brit Awards for the second time. They won. They also performed with Best UK Male Artist winner Sting on his classic "If You Love Somebody Set Them Free". The band went on to promote the album in Switzerland, Denmark, Holland, Italy, Norway and Greece as well as Sweden and Germany for three months.

== Artwork ==
The artwork for the single is a heart shaped tin can that half opened against a caustic bronze background. Photographed by Jason Tozer, it continues the metal artwork theme as seen on the artwork of previous single "Sight for Sore Eyes" with the corrugated metal sheets and the barbed-wire pear on the artwork of the Bizarre Fruit album.

== Remixes ==
With four remixes in total across both CD singles, from the likes of Armand van Helden, Fire Island, Luv Dup and Brothers in Rhythm, "Open Your Heart" had a set of club versions. It also contained an exclusive re-mix of previous single "Sight for Sore Eyes" done bone by producers E-Smoove. For the first time, specifically for a remix, Heather went back into the recording studio for Brothers in Rhythm to re-sing both the verses and chorus in a different arrangement. The band had done all this during the promotion of "Sight for Sore Eyes" in the autumn of 1994.

== Track listings ==
=== UK release ===
- Cassette single – 74321 26153 4
1. "Open Your Heart" (Radio Mix) – 3:41
2. "Open Your Heart" (Check Yer Head Mix) – 8:19
- 12-inch single – 74321 26153 1
1. "Open Your Heart" (M People Master Mix) – 5:44
2. "Open Your Heart" (Check Yer Head Mix) – 8:19
3. "Open Your Heart" (Fire Island Mix) – 7:45
4. "Open Your Heart" (Roach Motel Dub) – 6:00
- CD single 1 – 74321 26153 2
1. "Open Your Heart" (Radio Mix) – 3:41
2. "Open Your Heart" (M People Master Mix) – 5:44
3. "Open Your Heart" (Check Yer Head Mix) – 8:19
4. "Open Your Heart" (Fire Island Mix) – 7:45
5. "Open Your Heart" (Armand's Indian Beat–Down Mix) – 7:47
- CD single 2 – 74321 26154 2
1. "Open Your Heart" (Radio Mix) – 3:41
2. "Open Your Heart" (Brothers in Rhythm Soundtrack) – 10:15
3. "Sight for Sore Eyes" (E-Smoove Mix) – 9:13

=== US release ===
- 7–inch single – 34 77884
1. "Open Your Heart" (M People Edit) – 3:41
2. "Moving On Up" (Master Edit) – 3:34
- Cassette single – 34T 77884
1. "Open Your Heart" (M People Edit) – 3:41
2. "Open Your Heart" (Vlado's Radio Edit) – 3:35
- 12–inch single – 49 77867
1. "Open Your Heart" (Fire Island Mix) – 7:45
2. "Open Your Heart" (M People Master Mix) – 5:44
3. "Open Your Heart" (Roach Motel Dub) – 6:00
4. "Open Your Heart" (Armand's Indian Beat–Down Mix) – 7:47
5. "Open Your Heart" (Luv Dup Dub) – 9:20
- CD single – 49K 77867
1. "Open Your Heart" (M People Edit) – 3:41
2. "Open Your Heart" (Vlado's Radio Edit) – 3:35
3. "Open Your Heart" (Fire Island Mix) – 7:45
4. "Open Your Heart" (Brothers in Rhythm Soundtrack) – 10:15
5. "Sight for Sore Eyes" (E-Smoove Mix) – 9:13

== Charts ==
=== Weekly charts ===
Chart (1995)	Peak position
Australia (ARIA)	25
Belgium (Ultratop 50 Flanders)	40
Belgium (VRT Top 30 Flanders)	30
Canada Dance/Urban (RPM)	21
Europe (Eurochart Hot 100)	24
Europe (European Dance Radio)	3
Europe (European Hit Radio)	8
Finland (Suomen virallinen lista)	7
Germany (Media Control)	54
Iceland (Íslenski Listinn Topp 40)	12
Ireland (IRMA)	15
Israel (Israeli Singles Chart)	30
New Zealand (RIANZ)	21
Scotland (OCC)	8
Switzerland (Schweizer Hitparade)	36
UK Singles (OCC)	9
UK Dance (OCC)	3
UK Airplay (Music Week)	5
UK Club Chart (Music Week)	15
UK Pop Tip Club Chart (Music Week)	2
US Dance Club Play (Billboard)	1
US Maxi-Singles Sales (Billboard)	15

=== Year-end charts ===
Chart (1995)	Position
UK Airplay (Music Week)	38
UK Pop Tip Club Chart (Music Week)	43
US Dance Club Play (Billboard)	9
