= The Living Soap =

- Genre: Reality
- Country of origin: United Kingdom
- Original language: English
- No. of series: 1
- No. of episodes: 22

Production
- Producer: Paul Watson
- Running time: 30 minutes

Original release
- Network: BBC
- Release: 15 October 1993 – 13 August 1994

The Living Soap was a BBC North fly on the wall documentary series broadcast in 1993, which set out to show the everyday lives of six students sharing a house in Parsonage Road, Withington, Manchester. The six chosen students gave up their privacy for one year in return for free rent and the chance to be on television. Out of the original six participants, four of them left the show and were replaced by other willing students, chosen by a public telephone vote. Although the series was groundbreaking, The Living Soap attracted the wrong kind of controversy and was taken off the air after about five months, though filming continued. The remaining housemates appeared in two specials broadcast in August 1994, featuring highlights from their summer term.

The Living Soap differs from most of today's reality shows because, to achieve the sense of currency suggested by the show's name, each episode was aired as soon as it was made. Therefore, the depiction of everyday life was inevitably distorted from episode two onwards by the fact that the subjects were on television every week (students outside the programme criticised it for being completely untrue compared to real life as a student).

The six original students living in the house were Karen Bishko, Emma Harris, Matthew Lappin, Simon McKeown, Vidya "Spider" Manickavasagar and Daniel Moore. Four students moved in later on in the series: Mark Hamilton, Colin Rothbart, Nadia Agar-Smith and Annika Kielland.

The programme's subjects complained about the way they were portrayed due to the editing carried out by the show's producers and directors, which included Spencer Campbell. In an episode of the 2008 Channel 4 documentary series How TV Changed Britain, former housemate Colin Rothbart explained that he took part in the show not to be famous, but for "a laugh" and to use as a stepping stone into a career in television. Also interviewed was Spencer Campbell, who claimed to have developed the concept of a "diary room", in which reality television participants talk privately to a camera.
