= Love Rendezvous =

1995 single by M People

Single by M People

from the album Bizarre Fruit II
- Released: 2 October 1995
- Genre: Disco-pop; house
- Length: 3:51
- Label: Deconstruction
- Songwriters: Mike Pickering; Paul Heard
- Producer: M People

M People singles chronology
"Search for the Hero" (1995)	"Love Rendezvous" (1995)	"Itchycoo Park" (1995)

Music video
- "Love Rendezvous" on YouTube

Alternative cover
- CD2 cover of "Love Rendezvous".

"Love Rendezvous" is a song by British band M People, released in October 1995 by Deconstruction Records as the fourth single from their third album, Bizarre Fruit/Bizarre Fruit II (1994). Written by Mike Pickering, Paul Heard and Heather Small, and produced by M People, the song was released on 14 October after the band's world tour. It peaked at number thirty two on the UK Singles Chart and number 59 on the Eurochart Hot 100. The music video for the song was directed by Matthew Amos and filmed in Rio de Janeiro, Brazil.

== Background ==
Since the release of "Search for the Hero" four months previously, the band had relentlessly continued a world tour, played to sell-out Summer festivals in the UK, Belgium and Sweden. They then created a new radio and master mix for "Love Rendezvous", the fourth single from the album and a new track (the band's live favourite), a cover of The Small Faces' "Itchycoo Park". Like "Search for the Hero", the band re-edited the funky Bizarre Fruit version of "Love Rendezvous" to create a more radio-friendly pop version with the additional trademark sax ad-lib. This would delay the release of the single, which was originally planned for a released on 18 September 1995 but pushed back two weeks. This gave them time to prepare for a re-release of the already double platinum album to a deluxe edition called Bizarre Fruit II, which would feature the same tracks as before, new artwork and the new radio edit of "Search for the Hero" and the new master mixes of "Love Rendezvous" and "Itchycoo Park" as well as an additional second Live and Remixed CD.

== Composition ==
The new version of the song became part of M People's signature dance sound and was more typical of their sound in contrast to the softer more serious side of the band as heard on "Search for the Hero"; dancey piano chords, house beats and layers of synths. Lyrically, Heather sings about the arranged meeting with a lover away from everything else. She also namechecks singers Patti Smith ("Patti sang horses") and Stevie Wonder ("Stevie got uptight"). The newer version of this single also features a funky saxophone break in the middle-eight and also during the choruses. What remains from the original are the underlying keyboard sequences in the bridges up to the choruses. The backing vocals use the insistent refrain "Uptight, outta sight" as mentioned on Stevie Wonder's 1966 song "Uptight (Everything's Alright)", adding to the song's spirit of fun. M People backing vocalist Paul Johnson also plays a role, singing alongside Snake Davis's funky sax ad-lib during the middle eight.

== Release ==
"Love Rendezvous" was the second M People single to be available on two CD formats following the success of "Open Your Heart" earlier that year. These CDs were released on 2 October 1995, along with a 12-inch single and a cassette single. The CDs all feature the radio and master mixes of the single. CD1 contains the 'Uno Clio Dub Mix' and the US Remix of "Search for the Hero" by 'Dave Jam' Hall which was released too late to make it onto the last single. CD2 has two further mixes by K-Klass the 'Klub Mix' and 'Pharmacy Dub'.

The artwork for the single on CD1 is of a bunch of colourful flowers wrapped in paper enscripted with the band's name and title of the single. CD2 is simply a close-up view of the wrapping paper for the flowers without them featured. Both are set against a purple background.

== Critical reception ==
Caroline Sullivan from The Guardian felt that lead vocalist Heather Small is best "when backed by gospel-esque singers", as she is on "Love Rendezvous", "who create a lush, regal ambience." Pan-European magazine Music & Media described it as a "craftily-arranged number featuring Heather Small's dramatic vocals soaring out over a head-bobbing track, geared to attract instant EHR/dance airplay." Music Week's RM Dance Update deemed it a "very classy tune". RM editor Brad Beatnik gave it three out of five, calling it "a typical M People pop soul track". Another RM editor, James Hamilton, viewed it as a "piano and sax-nagged catchy 126bpm inevitable crossover smash". Sylvia Patterson from NME wrote, "In which her with the washing basket on her head sounds even more like several pairs of stripey woollen leggings have broken free and lagged themselves around her tonsils. Frighteningly average disco-pop fare about love being uptight, outta sight drivel drone." Andrew Harrison from Select declared it as a "spry house bouncer with Wigan Casino tang".

== Chart performance ==
The song entered the UK Singles Chart at number 33 with sales of 21,000 copies in its first week and 23,000 copies in its second, causing it to climb one place to peak at number 32. Although it was the fourth consecutive M People single to climb the chart in its second week, it did break the band's eight consecutive Top 10 single run. In the third and fourth week it slid down the chart to number 52 and then to 70, spending just 4 weeks on the chart. This was the lowest selling single from the album Bizarre Fruit and the lowest chart position since "Colour My Life" charted at number 35 some three years prior, in 1992. On the Eurochart Hot 100, "Love Rendezvous" peaked at number 59 on 28 October 1995.

=== Airplay ===
Airplay for the song began on 25 September 1995, at which time "Search for the Hero" had become an airplay staple across Europe, but in The UK, it was still in the lower echelons of Top 75 some four months on. In the four weeks prior to airplay "Love Rendezvous" entered the chart at No. 75, scaling to number 36 and then moving to number 23 and then to 15. After its physical release, the single's airplay stalled and peaked at number 9, despite heavy support from Dance stations Kiss and Galaxy, who were heavily rotating the K-Klass Klub Mix (Radio Edit).

UK radio stations' indifference to the song was compounded by the lower sales chart placing which meant it spent another four weeks falling swiftly out of the chart. It however continued the band's run of nine consecutive top ten airplay hits.

== Music video ==
The accompanying music video for "Love Rendezvous" was filmed over two days on Friday 25 and Saturday 26 August 1995 while the band were on the South American leg of their World tour. Director Matthew Amos and producer Laura Kanerick and the 'Medialab' crew filmed their live show at Citibank Hall which was then known as the "Arena Metropolitan" in front of 6,500 fans. On the first and second days of shooting, the band were filmed amongst the Rio people. Mike, Paul and Shovell are photographed together in the sunshine and there are deliberate football references, with Heather singing separately by day and night amongst locations including the Rio Botanical Gardens. The general theme also features some couples kissing and others running across the city's streets to meet and embrace. There are also views of other great Rio landmarks including the bright yellow trams and Christ the Redeemer, the world's largest Art Deco statue.

== Live performances ==
The band have not performed this single since the Bizarre Fruit Tour and subsequent 'Summer M Parties' of 1996, this is the only single to have not been performed since its release and it was also the only single to not be performed at The Best of M People concert in 1998 despite appearing on the accompanying The Best of M People album release in the same year. When released on the second 'best of' compilation Ultimate Collection in 2005, the band still left it off the set list on that year's tour.

== Other promotion ==
After returning from their world tour which had followed a summer of performing at Festivals in Ireland, Scotland's T in the Park, Switzerland and then covering America, Australia and the Far East, the band returned home to work on the deluxe issue of the parent album Bizarre Fruit, which had already gone double platinum, selling in excess of 600,000 copies. Although the band gave the single limited promotion, support from music video channels was strong but the release date was pushed from 16 September 1995 back a whole month. The video was premiered exclusively and in full on ITV's The Chart Show on Saturday 30 September 1995.

== Track listings ==
- Cassette single – 74321 31928 4
1. "Love Rendezvous" (Radio Mix) – 3:51
2. "Love Rendezvous" (Master Mix) – 5:55
- CD single 1 – 74321 31928 2
1. "Love Rendezvous" (Radio Mix) – 3:51
2. "Love Rendezvous" (Master Mix) – 5:55
3. "Love Rendezvous" (Uno Clio Dub Vocal) – 8:14
4. "Search for the Hero" (US Remix by Dave Hall) – 4:15
- CD single 2 – 74321 31929 2
1. "Love Rendezvous" (Radio Mix) – 3:51
2. "Love Rendezvous" (Master Mix) – 5:55
3. "Love Rendezvous" (K-Klass Klub Mix) – 8:00
4. "Love Rendezvous" (Pharmacy Dub) – 7:40
- 12-inch single – 74321 31929 1
1. "Love Rendezvous" (Master Mix) – 5:55
2. "Love Rendezvous" (Uno Clio Dub Vocal) – 8:14
3. "Love Rendezvous" (K-Klass Klub Mix) – 8:00
4. "Love Rendezvous" (Pharmacy Dub) – 7:40

== Charts ==
Chart (1995)	Peak position
Australia (ARIA)	114
Europe (Eurochart Hot 100)	59
Germany (GfK)	75
Iceland (Íslenski Listinn Topp 40)	40
Scotland Singles (OCC)	32
UK Singles (OCC)	32
UK Airplay (Music Week)	4
