= Close to a Miracle =

Studio album by Heather Small
- Released: 24 July 2006
- Genre: Pop, urban contemporary
- Length: 49:42
- Label: P&C Records
- Producer: Ben "Jammin" Robbins

Heather Small chronology
Ultimate Collection (2005)	Close to a Miracle (2006)	Colour My Life (2022)

Singles from Close to a Miracle
- 1. "Radio On" Released: 17 July 2006; 2. "Close to a Miracle" Released: 25 September 2006

Close to a Miracle is the second solo album by Heather Small. It was released on 24 July 2006 and was preceded by the single for "Radio On" which featured remixes by Josh Harris.

== Track listing ==
No.	Title	Writer(s)	Length
1.	"Radio On"	Deborah Ffrench, Grant Black, Naomi Streimer, Michael Scherchen	4:18
2.	"Close to a Miracle"	Heather Small, Paul Meehan, Tim Woodcock	3:52
3.	"Rise Up"	Jim Diamond, Paul Birchall	3:33
4.	"Today"	Gregg Sutton, Beth Hart, John Herron	4:51
5.	"Everything's Alright"	Small, Peter-John Vettese	4:25
6.	"50 Ways to Leave Your Lover"	Paul Simon	4:27
7.	"Finally Found My Way"	Small, Ben Robbins	3:19
8.	"Better Way"	Small, Niclas Windahl, Robbins	3:56
9.	"Crazy for You"	Small, Robbins	4:04
10.	"Private Glory"	Small, Rod Gammons, Steven McClintock	4:33
11.	"Love is Always There"	Small, Robbins	3:19
12.	"Don't Give Up on Love"	Small, Steve DuBerry	5:06

== Charts ==
Chart (2006)	Peak position
UK Albums (OCC)	57
