= Fresco (M People album) =

Studio album by M People
- Released: 13 October 1997
- Studio: Ridge Farm (Capel, England), Strongroom (London, England), Chung King (New York City)
- Length: 61:31
- Label: M People Records
- Producer: M People

M People chronology
Bizarre Fruit II (1995)	Fresco (1997)	The Best of M People (1998)

Singles from Fresco
- 1. "Just for You" Released: 22 September 1997; 2. "Fantasy Island" Released: 24 November 1997; 3. "Angel St" Released: 16 March 1998

Professional ratings
Review scores
Source	Rating
AllMusic	link
Encyclopedia of Popular Music	2/5 stars
Music Week	5/5 stars
NME	5/10 stars
Q	3/5 stars
Select	1/5 stars
Uncut	4/5 stars

Fresco is the fourth studio album by the British dance band M People. It includes the Top 10 singles "Just for You" and "Angel St", the single "Fantasy Island", and a cover version of the Roxy Music song "Avalon". The album reached number 2 in the UK Albums Chart, and was supported by a large UK arena tour. The tour confirmed M People as one of the UK's most successful live acts of the 1990s. Fresco became M People's last studio album to date as the group has not released any new material since. Various hit collections followed as well as two solo albums from lead singer Heather Small. By the end of 1998, Fresco had sold over 750,000 copies in the UK.

== Track listing ==
All songs written by Mike Pickering, Paul Heard and Heather Small except where noted.

No.	Title	Writer(s)	Length
1.	"Just for You"		6:01
2.	"Fantasy Island"		5:40
3.	"Never Mind Love"		4:24
4.	"Last Night 10,000"		5:13
5.	"Smile"		6:04
6.	"Red Flower Sunset"		4:57
7.	"Angel St"		5:31
8.	"Lonely"		4:46
9.	"Rhythm and Blues"		4:17
10.	"Believe It"		5:08
11.	"Bohemia"		3:28
12.	"Avalon"	Ferry	6:02
Total length:			61:31

== Personnel ==
- Heather Small – lead vocals
- Mike Pickering – saxophone, backing vocals
- Paul Heard – bass guitar, keyboards
- Shovell – percussion
- M People – production
- Phil Bodger – engineering, mixing (tracks 1,3,4,5,8,9,10)
- Neil McLennan – engineering, mixing (track 12)
- Tim Weidner – engineering, mixing (track 7)
- David 'EQ3' Sussman – engineering, mixing (tracks 2,11)
- Warren Riker – engineering, mixing (track 6)
- James Reynolds – additional engineering (tracks 1,3,5)
- Steve Sidelnyk – drum programming (tracks 1,3,4,5,7,8,9)
- Gäetan Schurrer – drum programming (track 10)
- Joey Moskowitz – drum programming (tracks 2,11)
- Che Pope – drum programming (track 6)
- Richard T. Norris – additional keyboards (tracks 4,12)
- Simon Ellis – additional keyboards (track 9)
- Paul Taylor – additional keyboards (tracks 1,3,5)
- Gäetan Schurrer – additional keyboards (tracks 1,3,5)
- George Pearson – additional keyboards (track 6)
- Joey Moskowitz – additional keyboards (tracks 2,11)
- Terry Burrus – grand piano, keyboards (tracks 2,7,11)
- Pino Palladino – bass guitar (tracks 1,3,4,5)
- Freddie Thomson – bass guitar (track 9)
- Paul Dileo – bass guitar (track 6)
- Tim LaFavre – upright bass (track 11)
- Snake Davies (saxophone, flute, EWI) (tracks 1,3,4,7,8,12)
- Neil Sidwell – trombone (track 8)
- John Thirkell – trumpet (track 8)
- Brooklyn Funk Essential – brass (tracks 2,11)
- Johnny Marr – guitars (tracks 9,10)
- Dave Ital – guitars (tracks 5,7)
- Milton McDonald – guitars (tracks 1,3)
- Mike Delguidice – guitars (track 6)
- The London Session Orchestra, arranged by Will Malone – strings (tracks 1,3,5,8)
- Simon Hale – strings (track 7)
- Danny Madden – background vocal arrangements (tracks 2,6,11)
- Paul Johnson – background vocals (tracks 10,12)
- Carroll Thompson – background vocals (tracks 1,3,5,7,8,9,10)
- Claudia Fontaine – background vocals (tracks 1,3,5,8,9)
- Beverly Skeete – background vocals (tracks 1,3,5,8,9)
- Chris Balins – background vocals (track 10)
- Sophia Jones – background vocals (track 10)
- Sylvia Mason-James – background vocals (track 3)
- Audrey Wheeler – background vocals (tracks 2,6,11)
- Khadeja Bass – background vocals (tracks 2,6,11)
- Nicki Richards – background vocals (tracks 2,6,11)
- Will Downing – background vocals (track 2)
- Mark Ledford – background vocals (track 2)
- Steve Thomton – percussion (track 11)
- Matthew Rolston – photography
- Farrow Design – design

== Charts ==
=== Weekly charts ===
Chart (1997)	Peak position
Australian Albums (ARIA)	51
Austrian Albums (Ö3 Austria)	21
Dutch Albums (Album Top 100)	76
European Albums	7
German Albums (Offizielle Top 100)	11
Irish Albums (IRMA)	3
New Zealand Albums (RMNZ)	5
Norwegian Albums (VG-lista)	30
Scottish Albums (OCC)	2
Swedish Albums (Sverigetopplistan)	37
Swiss Albums (Schweizer Hitparade)	20
UK Albums (OCC)	2

=== Year-end charts ===
Chart (1997)	Position
UK Albums (OCC)	17
Chart (1998)	Position
UK Albums (OCC)	57
