= Search for the Hero =

1995 single by M People

Single by M People

from the album Bizarre Fruit
- Released: 12 June 1995
- Genre: Soul; pop; hip hop
- Length: 6:11 (album version); 4:12 (single version)
- Label: Deconstruction
- Songwriters: Mike Pickering; Paul Heard
- Producer: M People

M People singles chronology
"Open Your Heart" (1995)	"Search for the Hero" (1995)	"Love Rendezvous" (1995)

Music video
- "Search for the Hero" on YouTube

"Search for the Hero" is a song by British dance music band M People, released in June 1995 by Deconstruction Records as the third single from their third album, Bizarre Fruit (1994). The song was written by bandmembers Mike Pickering and Paul Heard, and produced by the band. It peaked at number nine on the UK Singles Chart, number 13 on the UK Dance Singles Chart and number three on the UK R&B Singles Chart. In the US, it was released as a double A-side with "Padlock", which had several remixes by Junior Vasquez. The accompanying music video was directed by Matthew Amos and filmed in and around Battersea Power Station in London.

== Background ==
There had been a four-and-a-half-month gap between their previous single "Open Your Heart" and this single's release. Originally planned to be the second single, but delayed for a more radio-friendly single remix, "Search for the Hero" became one of the most familiar M People songs, responsible for propelling the parent album Bizarre Fruit back into the top 10 in 1995 after having first charted at No. 4 in November 1994. The saxophone parts were played by session saxophonist Snake Davis, as he has done for many other M People songs.

== Critical reception ==
William Cooper from AllMusic described the song as "jazzy" and named it one of the highlights from the Bizarre Fruit album. Another editor, Jon O'Brien, called it an "uplifting" anthem. Larry Flick from Billboard magazine named it an "optimistic pop/hip-hop number" and stated that Heather Small "continues to be a uniquely enchanting front woman, while her partners, Mike Pickering and Paul Heard, prove their mettle as tunesmiths who require attention beyond the parameters of nightclubs". Jeremy Biser from The Day said the track can "cure whatever ails the soul." Pan-European magazine Music & Media concluded, "Water and fire can be friends after all. Musically big-voiced Ms Small does something inconceivable for many others, namely singing a soulful ballad on quite a heavy rhythm track."

A reviewer from Music Week rated it three out of five, adding that "this laid back effort from Bizarre Fruit lacks the guts of its predecessors. Probably a hit, but certainly not their biggest." An editor, Alan Jones, named it one of the album's "better tracks", complimenting it as "superior and stately". He found that "the slower tempo suits Heather Small much better and the loose feel of the track is pleasing." Johnny Dee from NME praised its "excellent songwriting". People Magazine noted its "feel-good mantra" and stated that Small's "booming alto is hard to shake and, like her pineapple-shaped coif, impossible to ignore." James Hamilton from the Record Mirror Dance Update called it a "change of pace attractive sultry swayer". Wayne Bledsoe from Scripps Howard commented that "the cavernous acoustics on the intro to 'Search for the Hero' sound like a chopper landing in a field." He also remarked that Small's "commanding tone matches the grandiosity" of the intro.

== Chart performance ==
In June 1995, "Search for the Hero" continued the band's unbroken run of eight consecutive Top 10 singles, entering the chart and peaking at number nine. It had been expected to chart higher due to strong radio support, but it stayed in the Top 20 for three weeks like predecessor single: "Open Your Heart". The single dropped out of the top 40 after just five weeks. The two Bizarre Fruit singles "Open Your Heart" and "Search for the Hero" had been swapped by the record company because of the demand for dance music in 1995, so "Search for the Hero" was pushed to be the middle single scheduled for the summer as a precursor to their world tour.

The single sold 88,700 copies in its first week, almost as much as "Renaissance", which a year previously had sold 89,000 in its first week after charting higher at number five in February 1994.

== Airplay ==
Airplay for the single began five weeks before retail release, entering at number 45 and moving to 31 to 23 to 18 and then to number 15 in its first retail week. Unlike its sales, "Search for the Hero"'s airplay peaked at number 5, where it stayed for two weeks and did not leave the Airplay Top 40 for 13 weeks.

In May 1996, almost a year after release "Search for the Hero" re-entered the airplay chart at number 33 and climbed for five consecutive weeks to peak at number 20. This is therefore one of two singles in the '90s apart from Robbie Williams's "Angels" and Ultra Naté's "Free" to do so, possibly prompted by the song's use in a Peugeot 406 advert that same year.

== Music video ==
The music video for "Search for the Hero" was directed by Matthew Amos. The video was shot in early May 1995 in and around the iconic Battersea Power Station in South London on the still disused site with special flame effects and Heather at the forefront with the band playing behind her. A triptych of images are detailed with DNA formulae, people in busy places and body statistics make up this image and foundation of life. Children are also seen running free and playing in the desecration and dilapidation of broken down cars, bricks, mortar, fire and flames.

The whole line up of the band are seen as well as, on drums Andy Gangadeen, Lynieve Austin and Paul Johnson performing on backing vocals within the shell of the Power Station drums. The other images seen are of exploding cars, kids playing on wasteland, smashing glasses bottles and CCTV footage. There are two poignant images in the video are the dolls head falling to the ground and the child swing from the hanging rope noose.

== Remixes ==
Unusually for an M People single, mixes of the single were heavily R&B and not dance-orientated and were provided by Smith & Mighty. They serviced two mixes of the single in the form of a laid back R&B groove, the "Searchin Mix" and a dub of the same remix. The other mix is from producers Blacksmith with their "Mellow Flava Mix". The final track on the single is a live performance recorded in Germany on the Bizarre Fruit Tour earlier in 1995.

== Track listings ==
The US release was a double A-side with "Padlock", which had several remixes by Junior Vasquez.

=== UK release ===
- Cassette single – 74321 28796 4
1. "Search for the Hero" (Radio Mix) – 4:13
2. "Search for the Hero" (Live Mix) – 5:40
- 12-inch single – 74321 28796 1
1. "Search for the Hero" (Smith & Mighty Searchin Mix) – 5:57
2. "Search for the Hero" (Smith & Mighty Dub) – 5:38
3. "Search for the Hero" (Blacksmith Mellow Flava Mix) – 6:59
4. "Search for the Hero" (M People Master Mix) – 6:12
- CD single – 74321 28796 2
1. "Search for the Hero" (Radio Mix) – 4:13
2. "Search for the Hero" (Smith & Mighty Searchin Mix) – 5:57
3. "Search for the Hero" (Smith & Mighty Dub) – 5:38
4. "Search for the Hero" (Blacksmith Mellow Flava Mix) – 6:59
5. "Search for the Hero" (M People Live Mix) – 5:40

=== US release (Search for the Hero / Padlock) ===
- 12-inch single – 49 78022
1. "Padlock" (Sound Factory Mix) – 10:06
2. "Padlock" (12" Club Mix) – 8:52
3. "Padlock" (Factory Dub) – 5:27
4. "Padlock" (12" Club Dub) – 6:59
5. "Search for the Hero" (Master Mix) – 6:12
- CD single – 49K 78022
1. "Search for the Hero" (Radio Mix) – 4:13
2. "Search for the Hero" (Dave Hall Remix) – 4:15
3. "Search for the Hero" (M People Live Mix) – 5:40
4. "Padlock" (Sound Factory Mix) – 10:06
5. "Padlock" (12" Club Mix) – 8:52

== Charts ==
=== Weekly charts ===
Chart (1995)	Peak Position
Australia (ARIA)	37
Europe (Eurochart Hot 100)	29
Europe (European Dance Radio)	12
Europe (European Hit Radio)	4
Germany (Official German Charts)	39
Iceland (Íslenski Listinn Topp 40)	18
Ireland (IRMA)	13
Israel (Israeli Singles Chart)	11
Scotland (OCC)	8
UK Singles (OCC)	9
UK Dance (OCC)	13
UK R&B (OCC)	3
UK Airplay (Music Week)	1
US Maxi-Singles Sales (Billboard)	17

=== Year-end charts ===
Chart (1995)	Position
Europe (European Hit Radio)	34
Latvia (Latvijas Top 50)	39
UK Airplay (Music Week)	14

== Release history ==
Region	Date	Format(s)	Label(s)	Ref.
United Kingdom	12 June 1995	12-inch vinyl; CD; cassette	Deconstruction	
Australia	10 July 1995	CD; cassette	Deconstruction	
United States	15 August 1995	Rhythmic contemporary radio	Epic	
United States	22 August 1995	Contemporary hit radio	Epic	

== In popular culture ==
In 1996, one year after its release, "Search for the Hero" was used as the background music in a Peugeot 406 television advert. The advert debuted during ITV’s News at Ten, taking up the entire three-minute commercial break. The commercial combined the song with a series of acts of heroism, including a person administering CPR and a child being saved from being hit by a jackknifing tanker truck. It also saw the brand replace its former tagline: "The lion goes from strength to strength" with "The drive of your life".

The song was heard briefly in the 2015 Aardman film Shaun the Sheep Movie and Father Ted series 3, episode 2 Chirpy Burpy Cheap Sheep.

During the 2020 Conservative Party Conference, Prime Minister Boris Johnson urged people to "search for the hero inside yourself" when discussing the need to maintain a healthy weight during the coronavirus pandemic.
