= Just for You (M People song) =

Single by M People

from the album Fresco
- Released: 22 September 1997
- Genre: Pop; soul
- Length: 4:01
- Label: M People
- Songwriters: Mike Pickering; Paul Heard; Heather Small
- Producer: M People

M People singles chronology
"Itchycoo Park" (1995)	"Just for You" (1997)	"Fantasy Island" (1997)

Music video
- "Just for You" on YouTube

"Just for You" is a song by British band M People. It is the lead single from their fourth album, Fresco (1997), and their fifteenth overall single. Written by band members Mike Pickering, Paul Heard and Heather Small, and produced by M People, it was released on 22 September 1997, by M People Records. The song peaked at number eight on the UK Singles Chart and was a top-10 hit also in Spain. The accompanying music video was filmed in Los Angeles, the US, featuring the band in a coolly-lit disused warehouse and surrounded by a large orchestra.

== Composition ==
The intro to the song is led by an orchestral string movement, soon combined with a slow strummy guitar and Heather's vocals.

"Just for You" is a love song with Heather singing about the exultations of love and the lengths that she would go to always be there; to support, to sacrifice and to guide singing the insistent refrain at the end of every line of the verses: "Just for You".

== Critical reception ==
AllMusic editor Stephen Thomas Erlewine described the song as "sweeping orchestrated pop" and named it one of the highlights of the Fresco album. Another AllMusic editor, Jon O'Brien named it a "quite lovely acoustic ballad". British magazine NME called it "luscious wallpaper with Small's elegantly unfussy voice sinking into a sumptuous bed of synthesised strings and house-lite beats."

== Music video ==
The music video for "Just for You" was shot overnight in Los Angeles over the weekend of 24/25 August 1997. The four main members of the band featured prominently in a coolly-lit disused warehouse. In the fore, is Heather Small, sat on a blue silk draped sofa on a round stage surrounded by cables on the floor and speakers either side, singing the camera up above wearing a black nightdress. Also on the subtly-lit raised stage, is Shovell on drums, Paul Heard on guitar and Mike Pickering on bass guitar. The band are surrounded by a large orchestra playing in front of them strings and flutes adding to the relaxed tempo of the song, with silhouettes of the backing singers.

While the band and orchestra play along to the music various creatures are also present: frogs sit on various instruments, crickets climb the face of the flutist, butterflies perch on the violins and worms move through the mixing desk controls adding to the organic nature of the song.

Heather is the focus of the video and her eye contact is very much enhanced by her unwavering gaze as she sings and repositions herself on the couch. The cameras, camera men, microphone booms and lighting are all also seen as the video progresses as well as sound monitors and tape recorders are all working away.

== Promotion ==
The video was premiered on 12 September 1997 on music channel The Box, a music show called Good Stuff on 23 September and Videotech on ITV on 25 September. The band themselves first performed the song live on Chris Evans's Channel 4 show TFI Friday on 19 September and GMTV on the day of release. They also made their fourteenth promotional appearance on Top of the Pops on 26 September and the video was played in full on The Chart Show the next day.

== Remixes ==
There were four main remixes that appeared on the single. Firstly by the legendary New York DJ Frankie Knuckles, a remix by Manchester boys Rae & Christian, London's own premiere producers C-Swing and Bristol's DJs and producers: Way Out West. Also included on the single are the radio edit and album versions.

== Live ==
When performed live, the song is always performed in the second half of the band's shows, where Heather normally dedicates this song to her son and all the children in the audience.

They never perform the album version of the song with the longer second verse, but they do extend the song by creating a "false" ending after what sounds like of the final chorus, only to launch back into the song with an exhilarating and soaring 60-second proclamation as the backing vocalists chant: "Highest mountain, reach the top. Highest mountain, never stop", and Heather belting out "People keep climbing!!"

Finally, Heather launches into a call and response: Heather – "I wanna take you..." Audience/backing vocalists – "...Higher!"

== Track listings ==
- Cassette single – 74321 52300 4
1. "Just for You" (Radio Mix) – 4:01
2. "Just for You" (Rae & Christian Remix) – 6:49
- CD single – 74321 52300 2
1. "Just for You" (Radio Mix) – 4:01
2. "Just for You" (Rae & Christian Remix) – 6:49
3. "Just for You" (C-Swing's Master Mix) – 6:45
4. "Just for You" (Knuckles Classic Gospel Mix) – 9:30
5. "Just for You" (Way Out West Remix) – 6:14
6. "Just for You" (Album version) – 6:00
- 12–inch single – 74321 52300 1
1. "Just for You" (Rae & Christian Remix) – 6:49
2. "Just for You" (C-Swing's Master Mix) – 6:45
3. "Just for You" (Way Out West Remix) – 6:14
4. "Just for You" (Knuckles Classic Gospel Mix) – 9:30

== Charts ==
=== Weekly charts ===
Chart (1997)	Peak position
Australia (ARIA)	110
Belgium (Ultratip Bubbling Under Flanders)	10
Europe (Eurochart Hot 100)	34
Germany (GfK)	76
Iceland (Íslenski Listinn Topp 40)	31
Ireland (IRMA)	11
Netherlands (Single Top 100)	95
New Zealand (Recorded Music NZ)	23
Scotland (OCC)	8
Spain (AFYVE)	9
UK Singles (Official Charts)	8
UK Dance (OCC)	20

=== Year-end charts ===
Chart (1997)	Position
UK Singles (OCC)	120
