= Heather Small =

British singer (born 1965)

Heather Small MBE
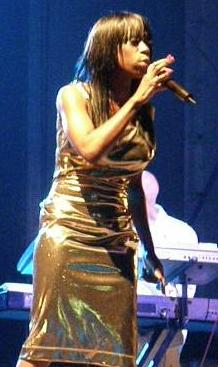
- Small performing in Southport, 2008

Background information
- Born: Heather Marguerita Small; 20 January 1965 (age 61)
- Origin: Ladbroke Grove, London, England
- Genres: R&B; dance; house; soul
- Occupation: Singer
- Years active: 1986–present
- Labels: BMG; Arista; P&C; East West
- Member of: M People
- Formerly of: Hot House
- Partner: Shaun Edwards (1990s)
- Website: heathersmall-mpeople.com
- Children: 1 (James Small-Edwards)

Heather Marguerita Small MBE (born 20 January 1965) is an English soul singer and lead vocalist of the band M People. Her subsequent debut solo studio album, Proud, was released in 2000. Her second and third studio albums, Close to a Miracle and Colour My Life, were released in 2006 and 2022, respectively.

== Early life ==
Heather Small was born in London to parents who came from Barbados in the early 1960s. She was brought up on a council estate in Ladbroke Grove, West London, and attended a local state school, where she excelled academically despite the lack of encouragement from teachers. She was a shy child and kept her passion for singing private, not even sharing it with her close family. At 18, she attended her first audition without telling anyone, reflecting the challenges of pursuing a creative career in a community with few role models in music.

== Career ==
=== 1987–1998: Hot House and M People ===
Small joined her first group, Hot House, as a singer while she was still a teenager. She was the studio singer voice of the re-recorded version of "Ride on Time" by Black Box. She had a chance meeting with Manchester DJ Mike Pickering, formerly of Quando Quango, which led to sales of more than 10 million albums worldwide with the group M People. They had considerable success with songs such as "Moving On Up", "One Night in Heaven" and "Search for the Hero".

In 1997, Small performed in "Perfect Day", the official 1997 Children in Need charity release, alongside a broad range of artists, including Tom Jones and Lou Reed. It sold more than a million copies and was the UK's number-one single for three weeks.

In 1998, Small and M People took some time off to pursue solo projects after The Best of M People was released.

=== 2000–2005: Proud ===
In 2000, Small released her debut solo album, Proud, and a single of the same name, closely affiliated with the British Olympic team of the time. The single, which was used for the first season and the last episode of the final season of Queer as Folk, is Small's signature song, with which she achieved international success. When Oprah Winfrey was looking for a song to sum up the work she had been striving to achieve over her twenty-year career, she contacted Small, and "Proud" became the theme song to The Oprah Winfrey Show; in 2005, Small made her American television debut on the show. Later the same year, "Proud" became the theme song for the American reality weight-loss show The Biggest Loser.

"Holding On" was released as the next single, followed in November 2000 by a duet single with Tom Jones, called "You Need Love Like I Do".

Small took time off to look after her newborn son, and record her second solo album. She occasionally appeared on various TV programmes such as Parkinson and Songs of Praise. She also sang three songs at the Tsunami Relief Concert at the Millennium Stadium in Cardiff.

In 2005, a second M People greatest hits collection, Ultimate Collection, was released. The record featured both the biggest M People hits and two of Small's solo singles. "Proud" was re-released from this album and reached number 33 on the UK singles chart. M People reunited and played together on an arena tour in 2005, and they have played a few times each year afterwards.

=== 2006–2008: Close to a Miracle ===
Small released a new single, "Radio On", in the UK on 17 July 2006. Her second solo album, Close to a Miracle, was released on 24 July, followed by a second single of the same name released digitally on 25 September 2006. It also includes a previously unreleased track, "Changes". The album was a commercial disappointment—it charted for one week at number 57, and both supporting singles failed to reach the Top 100—but a short UK solo tour later in the autumn was received well.

In 2007, Small collaborated with Icelandic tenor Garðar Thór Cortes on a song called "Luna". It was released as a single from his album Cortes and reached number two in the Icelandic online music charts. A new song was recorded to celebrate 200 years since the abolition of the slave trade, and Small performed at a concert in London to mark the anniversary on 10 November 2007. On 26 May 2008, Small performed alongside Stereophonics and Feeder at the Millennium Stadium in Cardiff as part of the celebrations of Wales's success at the 2008 Grand Slam. In addition, Small performed three nights at Ronnie Scott's in October as part of her 2008 tour, and headlined at Manchester Pride.

On 24 August 2008, she performed at the Visa London 2012 Party to celebrate the handover as host city of the Olympic Games from Beijing, China, to London. Small sang "Proud", which was the unofficial anthem of Team GB at the Athens Games in 2004, and was the official anthem of the London 2012 Games. In December 2008, she performed "Proud" again on the 2008 BBC Sports Personality of the Year programme, as a soundtrack to a montage of British Olympian achievements at Beijing.

=== Late 2008: Strictly Come Dancing ===
In 2008, Small was one of the sixteen celebrities in the sixth series of BBC's Strictly Come Dancing, in which she was partnered with newcomer Brian Fortuna. The couple were placed ninth overall in the series, and were in the bottom two on four occasions, in weeks 4, 5, 7, and 8. They were eventually voted off by the judges when they lost in the dance-off against Rachel Stevens. Small also appeared in an associated BBC Three series called Dancing on Wheels.

Week #	Dance	Judges' score					Result
Week #	Dance	Horwood	Phillips	Goodman	Tonioli	Total	Result
2	Salsa	5	6	8	7	26	Safe
4	Quickstep	6	5	6	6	23	Bottom Two/Saved
5	Samba	4	6	6	7	23	Bottom Two/Saved
6	Viennese Waltz	5	7	7	8	27	Safe
7	Cha-cha-cha	5	5	7	6	23	Bottom Two/Saved
8	Tango	6	7	7	7	27	Bottom Two/Eliminated

=== 2009–present ===
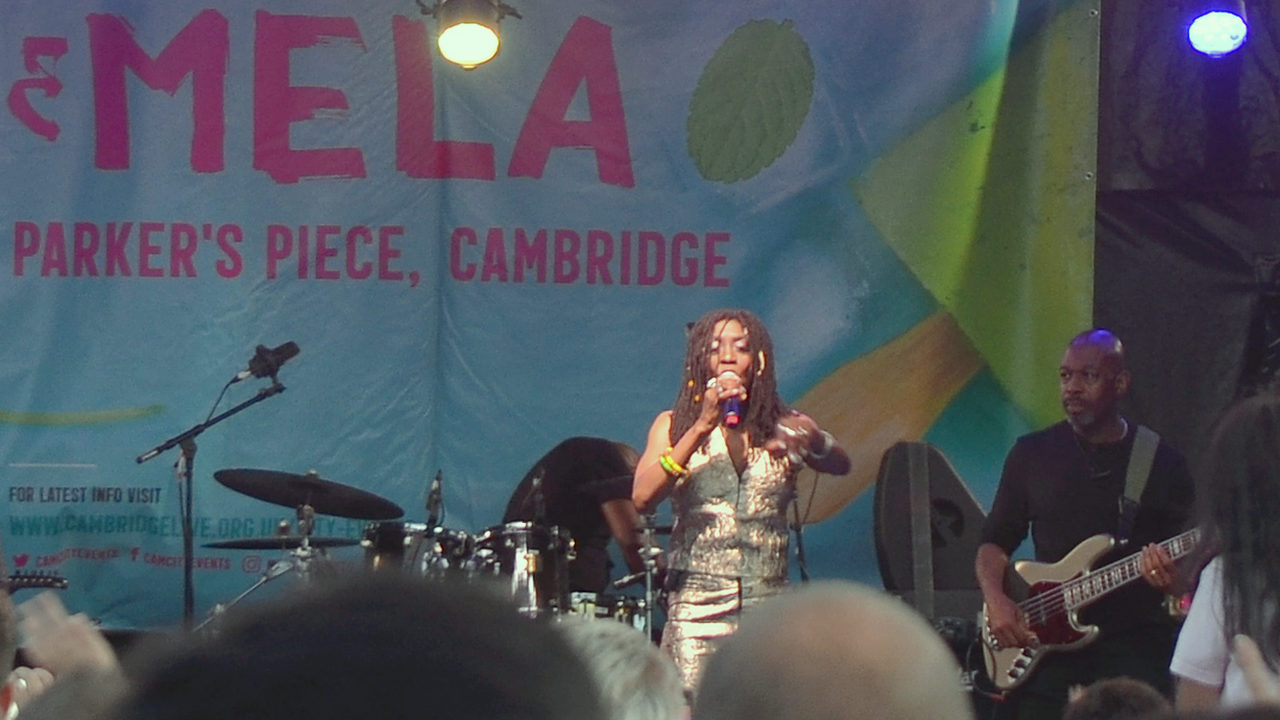
Heather Small at the Cambridge Big Weekend 2022

From late 2008 and throughout 2009, Small toured the UK. The setlist included Small's solo tracks, M People songs, and some jazz covers.

It was announced in July 2010 that Small would take Chaka Khan's place alongside Anastacia and Lulu for the second Here Come the Girls tour, which took place across the UK during November and December 2010. On 20 October 2010, she received a BASCA Gold Badge Award in recognition of her contribution to music.

In April 2011, Small performed as half-time entertainment at London's Twickenham Stadium for the annual St George's Day Premiership Rugby fixture hosted by Wasps. Performing with educational events company Pro-Excel, Small performed "Proud" and "Search for the Hero", and led a backing dance troupe of 546 UK students, becoming the Guinness World Record Holder for "The World's Biggest Ever Backing Dance Troupe for a Popstar".

On 29 October 2012, Small appeared at the 2012 Pride of Britain Awards, and sang "Proud" as a tribute to the athletes of the London 2012 Olympic Games.

During 2017, Small participated in the Camino de Santiago pilgrimage for the BBC, alongside Neil Morrissey, Debbie McGee, Ed Byrne, Kate Bottley, Raphael Rowe and JJ Chalmers. She commented on the experience afterwards: "I was a believer before I set off, but this trip made me realise my faith and beliefs were much stronger than I had realised."

In 2018, Small celebrated 25 years of singing. She toured around the UK, celebrating her and M People's music.

Alongside the tour, Small planned to release a new album, Heather Small: Orchestral Greatest Hits, in May 2018, but on 3 May, the project was declared as cancelled.

Small toured from 10 April to 26 April 2019.

In January 2022, Small appeared on the third series of The Masked Singer as "Chandelier". She was first to be unmasked.

== Charity work ==
Small actively supports several charities, such as BeatBullying, the Aiden Cox Foundation, Mencap (for which she had performed) and St Luke's Midnight Walk. She attended an anti-racism ceremony at 10 Downing Street for "Show Racism the Red Card", which was also attended by Sporting Elite, the prime minister and others. Small works regularly with Barnardo's; she has also become an ambassador of Asthma UK, as she suffered from asthma as a child. She has also said that she supports "a few charities" including the Rio Ferdinand Foundation and Greenhouse Sports.

== Personal life ==
Small lives in West London. In the 1990s, she had a long-term relationship with rugby league player and coach Shaun Edwards, with whom she has a son, Labour Party councillor and London Assembly member James Small-Edwards. Small lived in Standish, Greater Manchester, while cohabiting with Edwards.

Small was appointed Member of the Order of the British Empire (MBE) in the 2024 Birthday Honours for voluntary and charitable services.

== Discography ==
=== Albums ===
Title	Album details	Peak chart positions		Certifications
Title	Album details	UK	SWI	Certifications
Proud	Released: June 2000; Label: Arista; Formats: CD, cassette	12	81	BPI: Gold
Close to a Miracle	Released: 24 July 2006; Label: P&C; Formats: CD, digital download	57	—	
Colour My Life	Released: 29 July 2022; Label: East West; Formats: CD, LP, digital download	58	—	
"—" denotes releases that did not chart or were not released.

=== Singles ===
Year	Song	Peak chart positions			Certifications	Album
Year	Song	UK	GER	SWI	Certifications	Album
2000	"Proud"	16	92	83	BPI: Gold	Proud
2000	"Holding On"	58	—	—		Proud
2005	"Proud" (re-release)	33	—	—		Ultimate Collection
2006	"Radio On"	— (Note: "Radio On" did not enter the UK Singles Chart Top 100, but peaked at number 66 on the Physical Singles Chart and at number 11 on the Hip Hop & R&B Singles Chart.)	—	—		Close to a Miracle
2006	"Close to a Miracle"	—	—	—		Close to a Miracle
2019	"Proud" (remixes)	—	—	—		Non-album singles
2019	"Moving On Up" (remixes)	—	—	—		Non-album singles
2021	"United Together"	—	—	—		Non-album singles
2022	"Love Me or Not"	—	—	—		Colour My Life
2022	"Excited"	—	—	—		Colour My Life
As featured artist
1997	"Perfect Day" (with various artists)	1	54	37	BPI: 2× Platinum	Non-album single
2000	"You Need Love Like I Do" (with Tom Jones)	24	100	56		Reload
2007	"Luna" (with Garðar Thór Cortes)	—	—	—		Cortes
"—" denotes releases that did not chart or were not released.
