= Sharleen Spiteri discography =

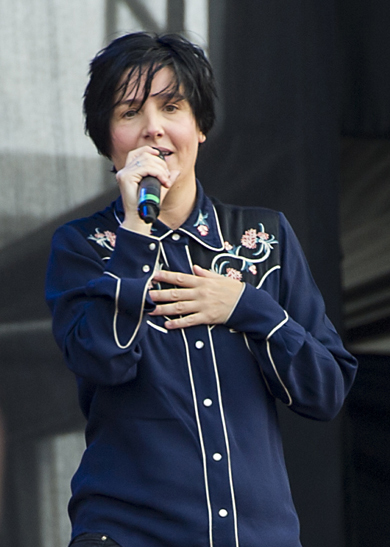
- Spiteri performing live with Texas in 2013
- Studio albums: 2
- Singles: 5
- B-sides: 8
- Music videos: 5
- Other charted songs: 2

This is the solo discography of Scottish singer–songwriter Sharleen Spiteri. Following the release of Texas' seventh studio album Red Book (2005), Texas began a hiatus which lead Spiteri to embark on a solo career. Her debut solo album, Melody, was released in 2008 to critical and commercial success. It reached number three on the UK Albums Chart, and spawned the successful single "All the Times I Cried". Subsequent single releases from the album, "Stop, I Don't Love You Anymore" and "It Was You" were less successful. A promotional single, "Don't Keep Me Waiting" was released exclusively in Switzerland, where it reached number seventy-eight on the Swiss Singles Hot 100 Charts.

Her second solo album, The Movie Songbook, was released on 1 March 2010. Whilst commercially less successful than Melody, it still charted strongly in the United Kingdom, France and Belgium, where it reached number thirteen, twenty-eight and twenty-seven (Flanders) and fifty-seven (Wallonia) respectively. It spawned one single, a cover of the 1980 song by Olivia Newton-John and Electric Light Orchestra "Xanadu", which reached number seventy one on the UK Singles Charts.

For the discography of the band Texas, in which Spiteri is the band's lead singer, see Texas discography.

== Studio albums ==
Year	Details	Peak chart positions							Certifications (sales thresholds)
Year	Details	SCO	UK	BEL (Fl)	BEL (Wa)	FRA	IRL	SWI	Certifications (sales thresholds)
2008	Melody: Released: 14 July 2008; Label: Mercury; Format: CD, digital download	2	3	15	13	13	28	19	UK: Gold
2010	The Movie Songbook: Released: 1 March 2010; Label: Mercury; Format: CD, digital download	4	13	27	67	28	—	—	

== Singles ==
=== As lead artist ===
Year	Title	Peak chart positions						Album
Year	Title	SCO	UK	BEL (Fl)	BEL (Wa)	EUR	SWI	Album
2008	"All the Times I Cried"	5	26	47	35	80	69	Melody
2008	"Don't Keep Me Waiting" (released in Switzerland only)	—	—	—	—	—	78	Melody
2008	"Stop, I Don't Love You Anymore"	—	—	—	—	—	—	Melody
2008	"It Was You"	—	—	—	—	—	—	Melody
2010	"Xanadu"	—	71	—	—	—	—	The Movie Songbook

=== As featured artist ===
- "Nothing 2 Prove" (Roger Sanchez featuring Sharleen Spiteri) (2002)
- "Stirb nicht vor mir (Don't Die Before I Do) " (Rammstein featuring Sharleen Spiteri) (2005)

=== Other appearances ===
- Gun – Taking on the World (1989) – backing vocals on tracks "The Feeling Within" and "I Will Be Waiting"

== See also ==
- Sharleen Spiteri
- Texas
