= Texas 25 =

Compilation album by Texas
- Released: 16 February 2015
- Label: PIAS
- Producer: Johnny McElhone; Leon Michels; Jeffrey Scott

Texas chronology
The Conversation (2013)	Texas 25 (2015)	Jump on Board (2017)

Singles from Texas 25
- 1. "Start a Family" Released: 6 January 2015; 2. "Are You Ready" Released: 25 May 2015

Professional ratings
Review scores
Source	Rating
AllMusic	3.5/5 stars

Texas 25 is a compilation album by Scottish rock band Texas, released on 16 February 2015. The album was released to celebrate the band's 25th anniversary and features eight reworked Texas tracks along with four new songs. A 2-disc deluxe edition of the album was also released, with disc 1 featuring the same track listing as the standard version of the album and disc 2 including the original versions of 15 of the band's biggest hits.

In 2016, it was awarded a gold certification from the Independent Music Companies Association, indicating sales of at least 75,000 copies throughout Europe.

== Track listing ==
=== Single disc standard version ===
1. "Start a Family" (new song)
2. "Black Eyed Boy" (Truth & Soul Mix)
3. "Say What You Want" (Truth & Soul Mix)
4. "Supafly Boy" (new song)
5. "Halo" (Truth & Soul Mix)
6. "Inner Smile" (Truth & Soul Mix)
7. "The Conversation" (Truth & Soul Mix)
8. "Say Goodbye" (new song)
9. "When We Are Together" (Truth & Soul Mix)
10. "Are You Ready" (new song)
11. "I Don't Want a Lover" (Truth & Soul Mix)
12. "Summer Son" (Truth & Soul Mix)

=== 2-disc deluxe edition ===
CD1

1. "Start a Family"
2. "Black Eyed Boy" (Truth & Soul Mix)
3. "Say What You Want" (Truth & Soul Mix)
4. "Supafly Boy"
5. "Halo" (Truth & Soul Mix)
6. "Inner Smile" (Truth & Soul Mix)
7. "The Conversation" (Truth & Soul Mix)
8. "Say Goodbye"
9. "When We Are Together" (Truth & Soul Mix)
10. "Are You Ready"
11. "I Don't Want a Lover" (Truth & Soul Mix)
12. "Summer Son" (Truth & Soul Mix)

CD2

1. "I Don't Want a Lover" (from Southside)
2. "Everyday Now" (from Southside)
3. "Say What You Want" (from White on Blonde)
4. "Halo" (from White on Blonde)
5. "Black Eyed Boy" (from White on Blonde)
6. "Put Your Arms Around Me" (from White on Blonde)
7. "Summer Son" (from The Hush)
8. "When We Are Together" (from The Hush)
9. "In Our Lifetime" (from The Hush)
10. "In Demand" (from The Greatest Hits)
11. "Inner Smile" (from The Greatest Hits)
12. "Sleep" (from Red Book)
13. "Say What You Want (All Day, Every Day)" (featuring the Wu-Tang Clan) (non-album single)
14. "The Conversation" (from The Conversation)
15. "Detroit City" (from The Conversation)

== Personnel ==
Adapted from AllMusic.

- Michael Bannister – keyboards, mixing
- Thomas Brenneck – guitar
- Julian Broad – cover photo
- Mike Buckley – baritone sax
- Barrie Cadogan – guitar
- Eddie Campbell – keyboards
- Alecia Chakour – background vocals
- Collin Dupuis – mixing
- Tom Elmhirst – mixing
- Dave Guy – trumpet
- Joe Harrison – assistant engineer
- Vincent John – guitar, keyboards
- Johnny McElhone – bass guitar, mixing, producer
- Ally McErlaine – guitar
- Ross McFarlane – percussion
- Tony McGovern – guitar
- Leon Michels – additional production, guitar, keyboards, producer, tenor sax
- Nick Movshon – bass, drums
- Luke O'Malley – guitar
- Lenesha Randolph – background vocals
- Ray Mason – trombone
- Jeffrey Scott – additional production, engineer, producer
- Sharleen Spiteri – composer, guitar, vocals
- Homer Steinweiss – drums
- Texas – primary artist
- Joe Visciano – mixing assistant

== Charts ==
=== Weekly charts ===
Chart (2015)	Peak position
Belgian Albums (Ultratop Flanders)	27
Belgian Albums (Ultratop Wallonia)	15
Dutch Albums (Album Top 100)	72
French Albums (SNEP)	7
Irish Albums (IRMA)	97
Scottish Albums (OCC)	2
Spanish Albums (PROMUSICAE)	47
Swiss Albums (Schweizer Hitparade)	32
UK Albums (OCC)	5

=== Year-end charts ===
Chart (2015)	Position
Belgian Albums (Ultratop Wallonia)	117
French Albums (SNEP)	73

== Certifications ==
Region	Certification	Certified units/sales
United Kingdom (BPI)	Silver	60,000^{‡}
^{‡} Sales+streaming figures based on certification alone.
