= The Conversation (Texas album) =

2013 studio album by Texas

Studio album by Texas
- Released: 20 May 2013
- Recorded: 2013 Glasgow, London; Richard Hawley's studio, Sheffield
- Genre: Alternative rock
- Length: 1:18:01
- Label: PIAS Recordings
- Producer: Johnny McElhone except "Big World" - Bernard Butler

Texas chronology
The BBC Sessions (2007)	The Conversation (2013)	Texas 25 (2015)

Singles from The Conversation
- 1. "The Conversation" Released: 25 March 2013; 2. "Detroit City" Released: 12 August 2013; 3. "Dry Your Eyes" Released: 18 November 2013

Professional ratings
Review scores
Source	Rating
Liverpool Sound and Vision	4.5/5 stars

The Conversation is the eighth album from Scottish rock band Texas. It was released on 20 May 2013. Tracks are written mainly by Sharleen Spiteri and Johnny McElhone, with Richard Hawley and Bernard Butler as collaborators. The Conversation is the group's first studio album of new material since Red Book in 2005. The title track "The Conversation" was released as the first single from the album in April 2013, followed by up-beat Pop Rock "Detroit City", both of which received a decent amount of UK airplay, including on BBC Radio 2's playlist.

Their third single from the album "Dry Your Eyes", was released in November 2013.

== Background ==
On 8 September 2009, band member Ally McErlaine was hospitalized after he collapsed with a massive brain aneurysm at the age of 40. By February 2010, he was recovering well as reported by bandmate Sharleen Spiteri in The Sunday Mail: "Ally is the most stubborn person I have ever come across, and I think his sheer pigheadedness is the reason he's still here! When he asked what was happening with Texas, I said it was up to him. He told me he wanted to get back into the studio".

After McErlaine survived his collapse - which kills in 80% of cases - Texas reunited for the first time since 2005. The band embarked on a tour in the summer of 2011 and lead singer Spiteri appeared on Popstar to Operastar on 12 June 2011 singing a version of the band's hit "Say What You Want". Prior to this, Texas had played at the Den Fynske Landsby Festival in Denmark. At the festival, they debuted a new track "The Conversation" which marked the first time the track has been played outside their native Glasgow.

Spiteri was also invited to make a series of cameo appearances at different events, all of which involved film scores. She sang Yvonne Elliman's "If I Can't Have You" for a Saturday Night Fever tribute concert and duetted with Italian singer Mauro Gioia on the "Love Theme from The Godfather".

== Writing and release ==
Karen Overton, who co-wrote five songs, is better known as Karen Anne, singer of the defunct band, Girl Called Johnny, which was the opening act on Texas' "The Conversation Tour". She released the song "Tell that Girl" before Texas published it on their album Jump on Board. She also released an earlier version of the song "Detroit City" originally named "New York City", with her former band Ramona.

In February 2013, Music Week announced the band had signed to PIAS Recordings; the album The Conversation was released in May 2013. The deluxe edition includes a second disc of a selection of hits recorded live at the Belladrum Tartan Heart Festival in 2011.

== Track listing ==
No.	Title	Writer(s)	Length
1.	"The Conversation"	Sharleen Spiteri, Johnny McElhone, Karen Overton, Amanda Ghost, Ian Dench	2:44
2.	"Dry Your Eyes"	Spiteri, McElhone, Richard Hawley	2:41
3.	"If This isn't Real"	Spiteri, McElhone, Overton, Jack McElhone	3:17
4.	"Detroit City"	Spiteri, McElhone, Overton, Robert Hodgens	3:42
5.	"I Will Always"	Spiteri, McElhone, Hawley	2:26
6.	"Talk About Love"	Spiteri, McElhone, Hawley	3:28
7.	"Hid From the Light"	Spiteri, McElhone, Hawley	3:32
8.	"Be True"	Spiteri, McElhone, Hawley	3:15
9.	"Maybe I"	Spiteri, McElhone, Hawley	2:38
10.	"Hearts Are Made to Stray"	Spiteri, McElhone, Overton	2:45
11.	"Big World"	Spiteri, McElhone, Bernard Butler, Overton	3:21
12.	"I Need Time"	Spiteri, McElhone, Hawley	3:20

iTunes bonus track
No.	Title	Length
13.	"Where Do You Go"	3:43

Deluxe edition bonus disc – Live in Scotland
No.	Title	Length
1.	"I Don't Want a Lover"	5:33
2.	"Summer Son"	4:09
3.	"Halo"	3:53
4.	"In Demand"	4:22
5.	"The Conversation"	3:06
6.	"When We Are Together"	3:55
7.	"In Our Lifetime"	4:06
8.	"Say What You Want"	3:45
9.	"Black Eyed Boy"	4:03
10.	"Inner Smile"	4:22

== Charts ==
=== Weekly charts ===
Chart (2013)	Peak position
Belgian Albums (Ultratop Flanders)	5
Belgian Albums (Ultratop Wallonia)	7
French Albums (SNEP)	8
Dutch Albums (Album Top 100)	46
German Albums (Offizielle Top 100)	38
Norwegian Albums (VG-lista)	27
Scottish Albums (OCC)	3
Spanish Albums (Promusicae)	21
Swedish Albums (Sverigetopplistan)	51
Swiss Albums (Schweizer Hitparade)	7
UK Albums (OCC)	4
UK Album Downloads (OCC)	13
UK Independent Albums (OCC)	2

=== Year-end charts ===
Chart (2013)	Position
Belgian Albums (Ultratop Flanders)	89
Belgian Albums (Ultratop Wallonia)	35
French Albums (SNEP)	51
UK Albums (OCC)	129

Chart (2014)	Position
French Albums (SNEP)	124

== Certifications ==
Region	Certification	Certified units/sales
France (SNEP)	Platinum	130,000
United Kingdom (BPI)	Gold	100,000^{‡}
^{‡} Sales+streaming figures based on certification alone.

In 2016, it was awarded a diamond certification from the Independent Music Companies Association, which indicated sales of at least 200,000 copies+ throughout Europe.
