= The Conversation (Texas song) =

Single by Texas

from the album The Conversation
- B-side: "The Conversation" (instrumental)
- Released: 25 March 2013
- Recorded: 2012–2013
- Length: 2:46
- Label: PIAS
- Songwriter(s): Sharleen Spiteri; Johnny McElhone; Amanda Ghost; Ian Dench
- Producer(s): Johnny McElhone

Texas singles chronology
"Sleep" (2006)	"The Conversation" (2013)	"Detroit City" (2013)

"The Conversation" is a 2013 song by Scottish alternative rock band Texas from their album of the same name. The single was released in March 2013 through PIAS and marked the comeback for the band following a seven-year hiatus following the release of their previous single "Sleep" in 2006.

== Release and promotion ==
"The Conversation" was added to the BBC Radio 2 playlist in the United Kingdom and receiving heavy circulation on the radio station prior to the release of the single and album.

== Commercial performance ==
The release of "The Conversation" marked the first appearance of Texas on the UK Singles Chart since the release of "Sleep" in 2006. "The Conversation" debuted at number 73 on the UK Singles Chart, remaining on the chart for one week.

In France, the release of the single fared better commercially, where it reached number 22 on the French Singles Chart.

== Music video ==
A music video for the single release was recorded in Paris, France. The accompanying music video features lead singer Sharleen Spiteri and actor Peter Mullan, best known for his roles in Trainspotting (1996) and the Harry Potter film series. Spiteri explained to The Guardian "Basically, I'm supposed to be an art thief and Peter Mullan is supposed to be the boss of me, but someone's got wind of our game and tries to intercept that. And I'm thinking he will get caught".

=== Spiteri accident ===
During filming for the video, Spiteri was hospitalised following a fall she sustained during the shooting for the video, when she tripped over a kerb in Paris. Spiteri slipped when turning a corner and was taken to hospital suffering from a concussion and also sustained grazes to her face. Spiteri was kept in for observation and missed the rest of the video shoot.

After Spiteri was discharged from hospital, the shoot was rescheduled and new dates arranged for the music video to be filmed in London.

== Track listing ==
1. "The Conversation" – 2:46
2. "The Conversation" (Instrumental) – 2:46

== Charts ==
=== Weekly charts ===
Weekly chart performance for "The Conversation"
Chart (2013)	Peak position
Belgium (Ultratip Bubbling Under Flanders)	3
Belgium (Ultratop 50 Wallonia)	14
France (SNEP)	22
Switzerland (Schweizer Hitparade)	14
UK Singles (OCC)	73

=== Year-end charts ===
Year-end chart performance for "The Conversation"
Chart (2013)	Position
Belgium (Ultratop Wallonia)	85
France (SNEP)	70
