= Start a Family =

Single by Texas

from the album Texas 25
- Released: 6 January 2015
- Recorded: 2014, Glasgow and New York City
- Genre: Alternative rock
- Length: 3:31
- Label: Pias
- Songwriter(s): Sharleen Spiteri; Johnny McElhone; Karen Overton; Jack McElhone
- Producer(s): Johnny McElhone

Texas singles chronology
"Dry Your Eyes" (2013)	"Start a Family" (2015)	"Let's Work It Out" (2017)

"Start a Family" is a 2015 single released by Scottish alternative rock band Texas, as the lead single from their compilation album Texas 25 (2015). The song was written by Sharleen Spiteri, Johnny McElhone, Karen Overton, Jack McElhone and produced by Johnny McElhone.

== Background and recording ==
The song was written and recorded during sessions in 2014 in Glasgow and New York to serve as one of two original tracks for the bands upcoming compilation album Texas 25. The song includes a spoken-word performance by actor Alan Rickman, who appeared in the music video for the band's 2000 single "In Demand" where he danced with lead singer Sharleen Spiteri. Speaking about the song and the partnership with Rickman, Spiteri said "We did the original in New York and then we came back and we were like, it would be really interesting to do something... I mean, it's such a delicate song and it's quite emotional", further explaining: "The song is all about roads and paths and choices and to know that there's someone who's always got your back although some people don't ever want to accept that, so it would probably be stronger if a man sang the second verse. I was like, 'What about if we got Alan to sing it?' I have always been mesmerized by Alan's voice. We did the 'In Demand' video in 2000 and we've remained friends ever since. So I phoned him up and was like, 'Do you fancy singing on a record?' He just burst out laughing and said, 'Darling, what do you mean? Sing? I could try."

== Release ==
The single was released on 6 January 2015 as the lead single from their compilation album Texas 25.

== Commercial performance ==
The single release had moderate success in European markets, making chart appearances in France and Belgium. The song charted at number 151 in France and number 28 on the Ultratip Wallonia charts and number 24 on the Ultratip Flanders charts in Belgium.

== Chart performance ==
Chart performance for "Start a Family"
Chart (2015)	Peak position
Belgium (Ultratip Bubbling Under Flanders)	24
Belgium (Ultratip Bubbling Under Wallonia)	28
France (SNEP)	151
