= Texas (band) =

Scottish alternative rock band

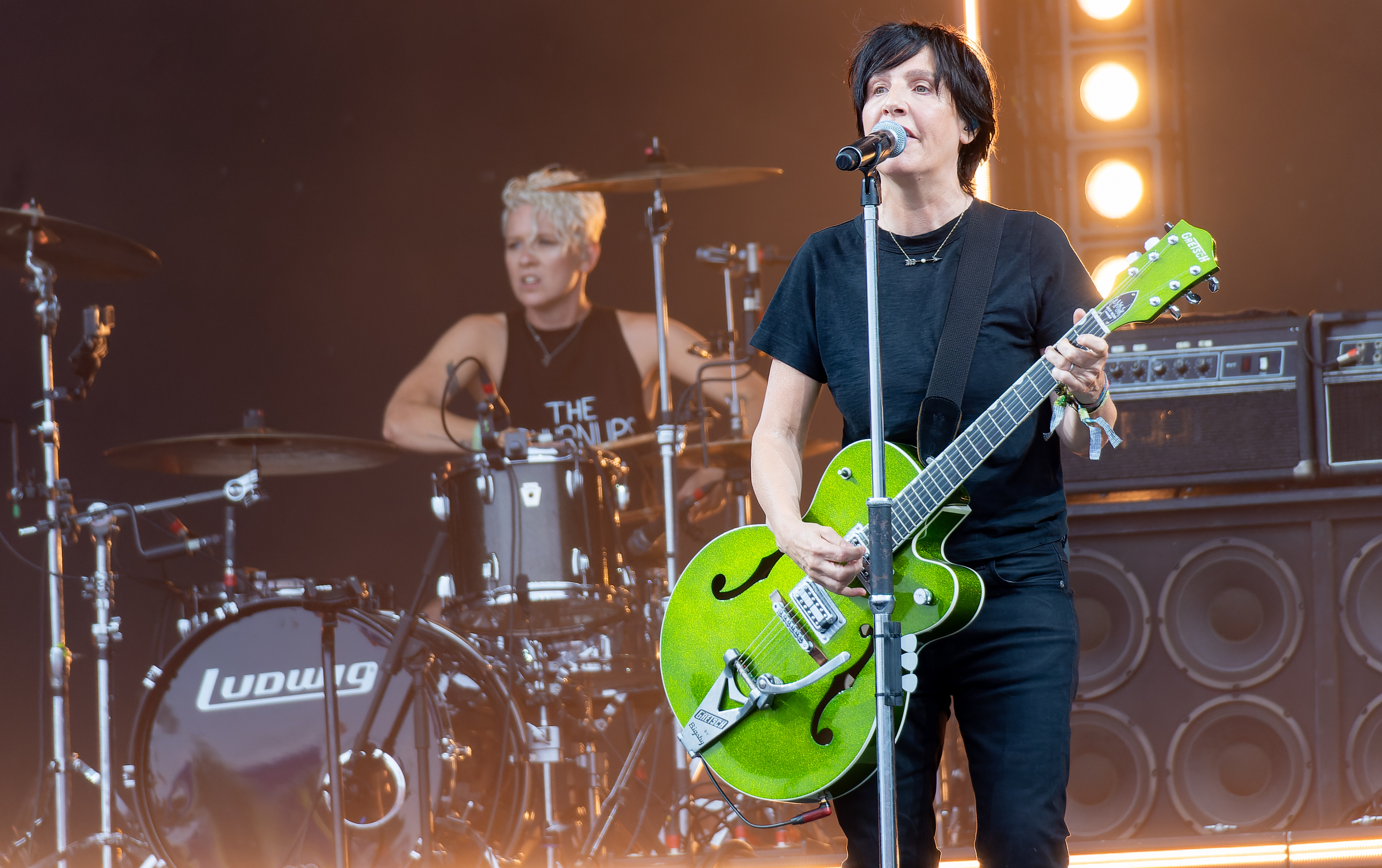
- Texas performing at Glastonbury Festival 2023

Background information
- Origin: Glasgow, Scotland
- Genres: Alternative rock; pop rock; soft rock
- Years active: 1986–2005; 2013–present
- Labels: Mercury; Vertigo; PIAS; BMG
- Members: Sharleen Spiteri; Johnny McElhone; Eddie Campbell; Tony McGovern; Cat Myers
- Past members: Stuart Kerr; Richard Hynd; Neil Payne; Ross McFarlane; Tony O'Boyle; Michael Bannister; Ally McErlaine
- Website: texas.uk.com

Texas are a Scottish rock band from Glasgow, founded in 1986 by Johnny McElhone, Ally McErlaine, Tony O'Boyle, and Sharleen Spiteri. They made their performing debut in March 1988 at the University of Dundee, and released their debut album Southside in 1989, along with their debut single "I Don't Want a Lover". Southside entered at number three on the UK Albums Chart and number 88 on the Billboard 200 album chart in the United States, and sold over two million copies worldwide. Despite the success of Southside, the follow-up albums Mothers Heaven (1991) and Ricks Road (1993) were less successful, but achieved moderate success on various European markets.

Their fourth album, White on Blonde (1997), debuted atop the albums charts in their native Scotland and in the United Kingdom and became their biggest seller, being certified six times platinum in the United Kingdom. Follow up album The Hush (1999) achieved similar commercial success which continued in 2000 with the release of The Greatest Hits. They released another studio album, Careful What You Wish For (2003), and in October 2005, Sharleen Spiteri was featured in Rammstein's song 'Stirb nicht vor mir (Don't Die Before I Do)' (2005) from their 2005 'Rosenrot' album, and released Red Book (2005), the month after Sharleen's feature before beginning an "indefinite hiatus" in 2005. During their hiatus, lead singer, Sharleen Spiteri, launched a solo career, releasing her debut solo album, Melody, in 2008.

Their hiatus ended in 2013 with the release of their eighth album, The Conversation. In February 2017, they released "Let's Work It Out" as the lead single from their ninth album, Jump on Board (2017), which peaked within the top ten of the album charts in Belgium and France. Their tenth album, Hi (2021), became their highest-charting album in the UK since The Hush, debuting at number three on the official UK albums chart, number one on the UK independent albums chart, and entering at number one in their native Scotland. As of 2017, Texas's worldwide sales were 40 million records

== History ==
=== 1989–1997: Southside and breakthrough ===
Texas were formed in 1986 by singer Sharleen Spiteri, bass guitarist Johnny McElhone and guitarist Ally McErlaine. At the time, Spiteri was working at Irvine and Rita Rusk's salon as a hairdresser in Glasgow. The band's debut single, "I Don't Want a Lover", was released in January 1989. It peaked at number eight on the UK Singles Chart and No. 77 on the US Billboard Hot 100 chart, as well as top-40 positions in various countries worldwide. The band released their debut album, Southside, in March 1989, which peaked at number three on the UK Albums Chart and was certified Gold by the BPI. However, three further singles from the album all failed to make the UK top 40, with "Thrill Has Gone" reaching No. 60, "Everyday Now" faring little better at No. 44 (though reaching the Top 30 in France), and "Prayer for You" stalling at No. 73.

The band's second album, Mothers Heaven, was released in September 1991. It was preceded by the single "Why Believe in You", but this failed to reach the UK top 40 stalling at No. 66 on the UK Singles Chart. This did not bode well for the album, which itself peaked at No. 32 in the UK. A second single, "In My Heart", fared worse and became Texas's lowest-charting single in the UK, reaching No. 74, making it their fifth single in a row to failed to break the top 40. A third single from the album, "Alone with You", was released in January 1992 and reached No. 32, giving them their second top-40 entry. Ironically, immediately following the disappointing performance of the album and its singles, Texas released a new cover version of the Al Green classic "Tired of Being Alone" in April 1992. The single, which was not included on the album, was more successful and returned the band to the UK top 20, peaking at No. 19.

Texas released their third album, Ricks Road in November 1993. It was preceded by two more top-40 singles, "So Called Friend" (UK No. 30) and "You Owe It All to Me" (UK No. 39). The album peaked at No. 18 on the UK Albums Chart. The music video for "You Owe It All to Me" was directed by Dani Jacobs, and was filmed in Arizona and features Spiteri and McErlaine filmed in the style of a road movie with the pair encountering another version of themselves along the way. A third single from the album, "So In Love With You", reached No. 28 in the UK in February 1994.

=== 1997–1998: Resurgence and White on Blonde ===
Texas perform at the 1998 Brit Awards with the Wu-Tang Clan

Following an endorsement by then Radio 1 presenter Chris Evans on his Channel 4 show TFI Friday in 1997, Texas came back to the music scene with the international hit "Say What You Want". The song was released internationally on 6 January 1997 and became the band's highest-peaking single to date on the UK Singles Chart, reaching No. 3 in its second week of release. In February, Texas released their fourth album, White on Blonde, which went on to become the band's most successful album to date. The album debuted at No. 1 on the UK Albums Chart and returned to the top spot again six months later. It remained in the UK top 75 for 91 weeks. A total of five singles were taken from the album, all of which were top-ten hits in the UK. "Halo", released in April 1997, peaked at No. 10, "Black Eyed Boy", released in July 1997, peaked at No. 5, and "Put Your Arms Around Me", released in November 1997, also peaked at No. 10. In 1998, the song was featured in the film Ever After: A Cinderella Story, starring Drew Barrymore. The band then released a double A-sided single of "Insane" along with "Say What You Want (All Day, Every Day)"—a new version of the first hit from the album but now with additional rap vocals from the Wu-Tang Clan. The single peaked at No. 4 in the UK.

White on Blonde became the pinnacle of the band's success, and was certified 6 × Platinum by the BPI for UK sales in excess of 1.8 million copies. It was included in Q magazine's "50 Best Albums of 1997", and voted the 86th-best album of all time by Q readers in 1998. It also ranked No. 34 in Q's "Best 50 Albums of Q's Lifetime", as well being included in Q's "90 Best Albums of the 1990s". In 2010, it was nominated for the BRIT Awards "Best Album in the Past 25 Years".

=== 1999–2001: The Hush and commercial prominence ===
In April 1999, Texas released the first single from their forthcoming fifth studio album. "In Our Lifetime" peaked at No. 4 on the UK Singles Chart and was also included on the Notting Hill film soundtrack that year. The band's fifth album, The Hush, was released in May 1999 and charted at No. 1 on the UK Albums Chart in its first week of release. A second single, "Summer Son", was released in August 1999, reaching No. 5, the band's seventh UK top-ten single at that point. A third and final single, "When We Are Together", was released in November 1999 and narrowly missed the UK top ten (peaking at 12). The album was certified 3 x Platinum by the BPI for UK sales in excess of 900,000 copies.

In October 2000, Texas released their first compilation album, The Greatest Hits. The album featured tracks spanning their career, from their 1989 debut to the current day and included three new songs. A new single, "In Demand" was released on 2 October 2000 and reached No. 6 in the UK, with a video that featured the actor Alan Rickman. When The Greatest Hits was released, it became the band's third consecutive album to debut at No. 1 in the UK. A second new single from the collection, "Inner Smile", was released at the end of 2000, also reaching No. 6 on the UK Singles Chart. The video for "Inner Smile" featured a homage to Elvis Presley (and specifically his '68 Comeback Special shows) with lead singer Spiteri dressed and made up to look like Elvis in his famous black leather suit. In July 2001, a remix of "I Don't Want A Lover" was released which made the UK top 20. By this time, The Greatest Hits album had become a huge success and was eventually certified 6 × Platinum by the BPI for UK sales in excess of 1.8 million copies.

The single "Like Lovers (Holding On)" was featured during the closing credits of the 2000 animated feature film Titan A.E. and also appears briefly in one scene as background music. The song was included on the Titan A.E. soundtrack as well.

=== 2003–2006: Careful What You Wish For and Red Book ===
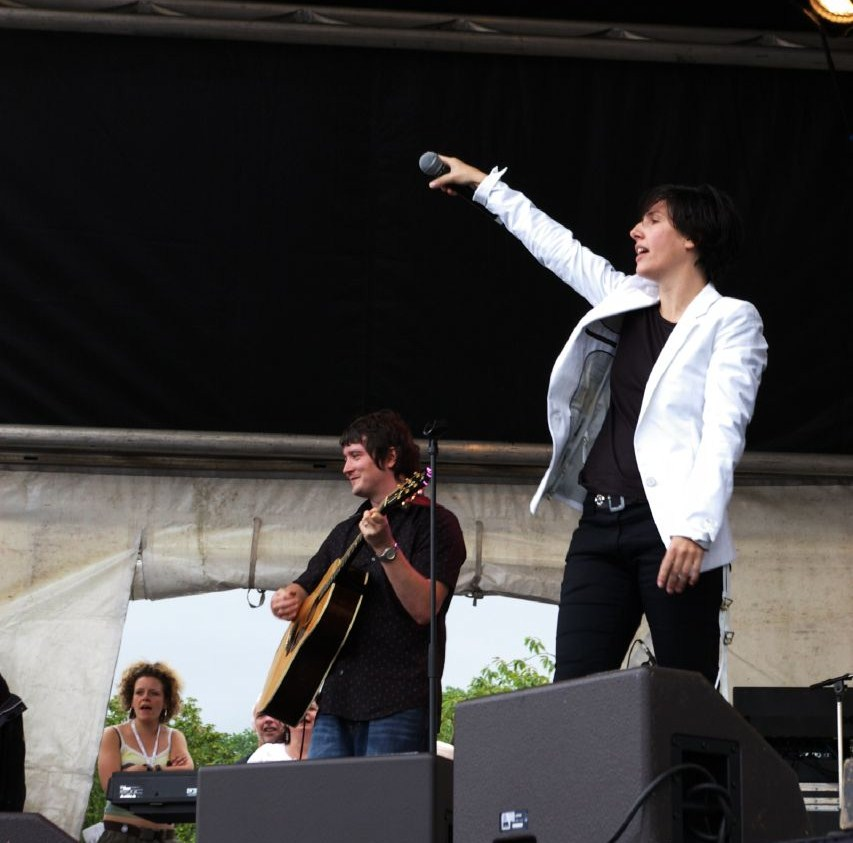
Spiteri and Ally McErlaine performing live in 2004

In September 2002, Spiteri gave birth to her daughter, Misty Kyd, although motherhood did not prevent her from working on another album. In October 2003, Texas released the first single from their upcoming sixth album titled "Carnival Girl" which featured rapping vocals by Canadian artist Kardinal Offishall. The song reached No. 9 on the UK Singles Chart. Later that month, the album Careful What You Wish For was released. The album peaked at No. 5 on the UK Albums Chart and was certified Gold by the BPI for sales of over 100,000 copies in the United Kingdom. In December 2003, a second and final single was released from the album entitled "I'll See It Through", though this peaked at a lowly No. 40 on the UK Singles Chart.

The band returned in August 2005 with a new single "Getaway", which peaked at No. 6, becoming the band's tenth UK top-ten single. It was followed by another new single, "Can't Resist", released in October 2005. The song reached No. 13 in the UK, and was followed by the band's seventh studio album, Red Book, released in November 2005. The album reached No. 16 in the UK Albums Chart, ending their run of top-10 albums though was certified Gold by the BPI for sales of over 100,000 copies in the United Kingdom. A third and final single from the album, "Sleep", was released in January 2006 and peaked at No. 6 on the UK Singles Chart. The song featured vocals from Paul Buchannan from the Scottish band the Blue Nile and the video featured comedian Peter Kay. On 21 February 2006, a promo-only single, "What About Us", was released.

=== 2007–2011: Hiatus ===
On 24 September 2007, the band released The BBC Sessions, which included radio sessions spanning from 1989 to 2005, with extensive liner notes and interviews with Spiteri. Cover songs include Elmore James's "It Hurts Me Too", the Beatles' "I've Got a Feeling", and Ashford & Simpson's "You're All I Need to Get By." In 2008, Spiteri embarked on a solo career. Her debut album Melody was released in July 2008 and debuted at No. 3 in the UK. Spiteri's second solo studio album The Movie Songbook was released on 1 March 2010, and peaked at No. 13 in the UK.

On 8 September 2009, bandmember Ally McErlaine was hospitalised after he collapsed with a massive brain aneurysm at the age of 40. By February 2010, he was recovering well as reported by bandmate Spiteri in The Sunday Mail: "Ally is the most stubborn person I have ever come across, and I think his sheer pigheadedness is the reason he's still here! When he asked what was happening with Texas, I said it was up to him. He told me he wanted to get back into the studio".

==== Hiatus projects ====
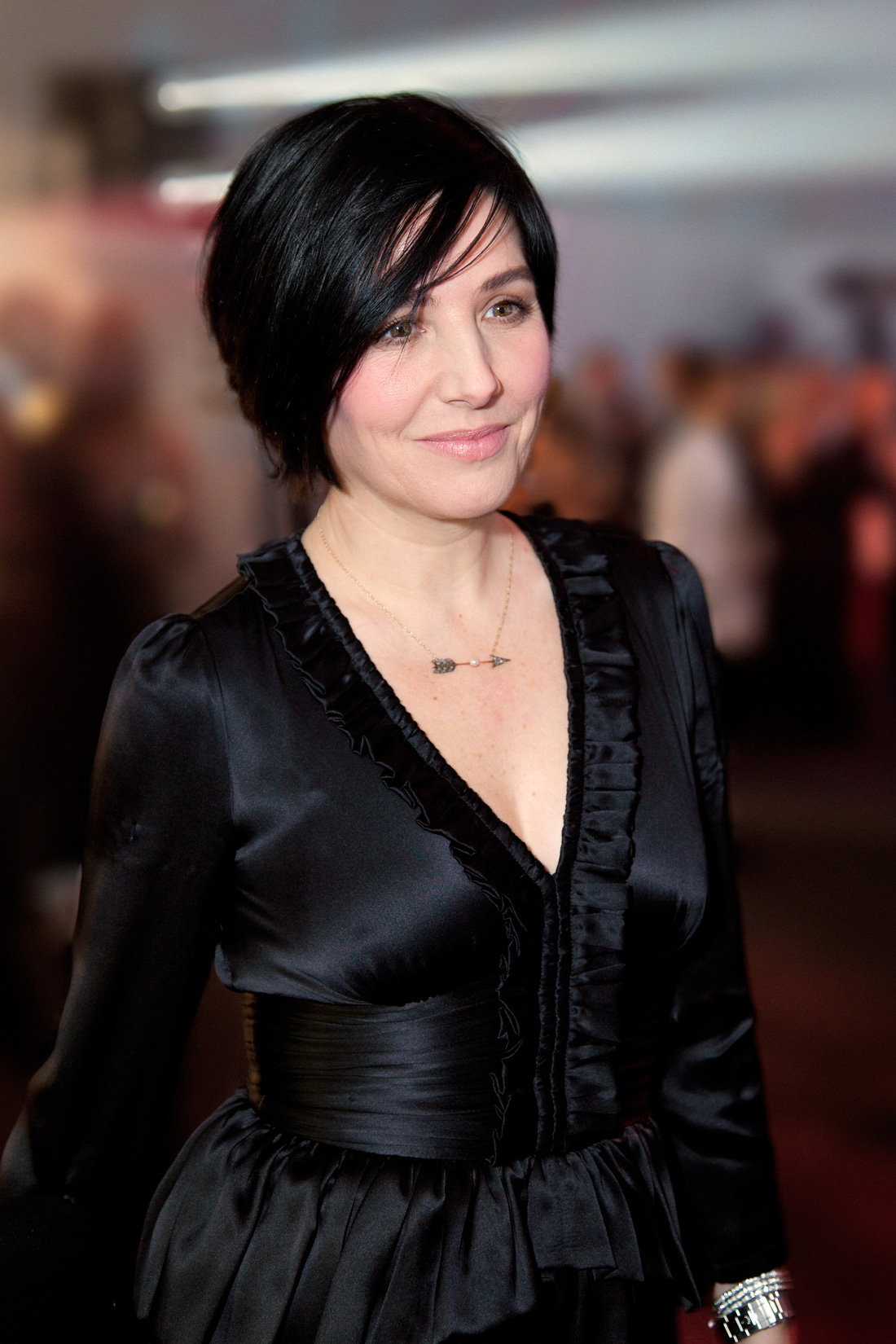
Lead singer Spiteri on 20 February 2011

After the release of Texas's 2005 album Red Book the band members confirmed that they would enter a hiatus. Spiteri performed as guest vocalist on Rammstein's "Rosenrot" album. She began work on her debut solo album, working with some of her former bandmates. She wrote the vast majority of the tracks on the album. She released her debut solo album Melody on 14 July 2008 with "All the Times I Cried" serving as the album's lead single, with a further two singles were released worldwide, "Stop, I Don't Love You Anymore" and "It Was You". By 2009, Melody has been certified Gold by the BPI (United Kingdom) with sales of over 100,000.

Spiteri released her second solo studio album The Movie Songbook which consists of movie covers chosen by Spiteri herself was released on 1 March 2010. The album's lead single "Xanadu" was released in February 2010. To promote the album, she performed in front of 55,000 fans supporting Paul McCartney on his Up and Coming Tour at Glasgow's Hampden Park. In 2010, Spiteri was a judge on the Sky 1 reality show Must Be the Music.

=== 2011–2017: Reunion and The Conversation ===
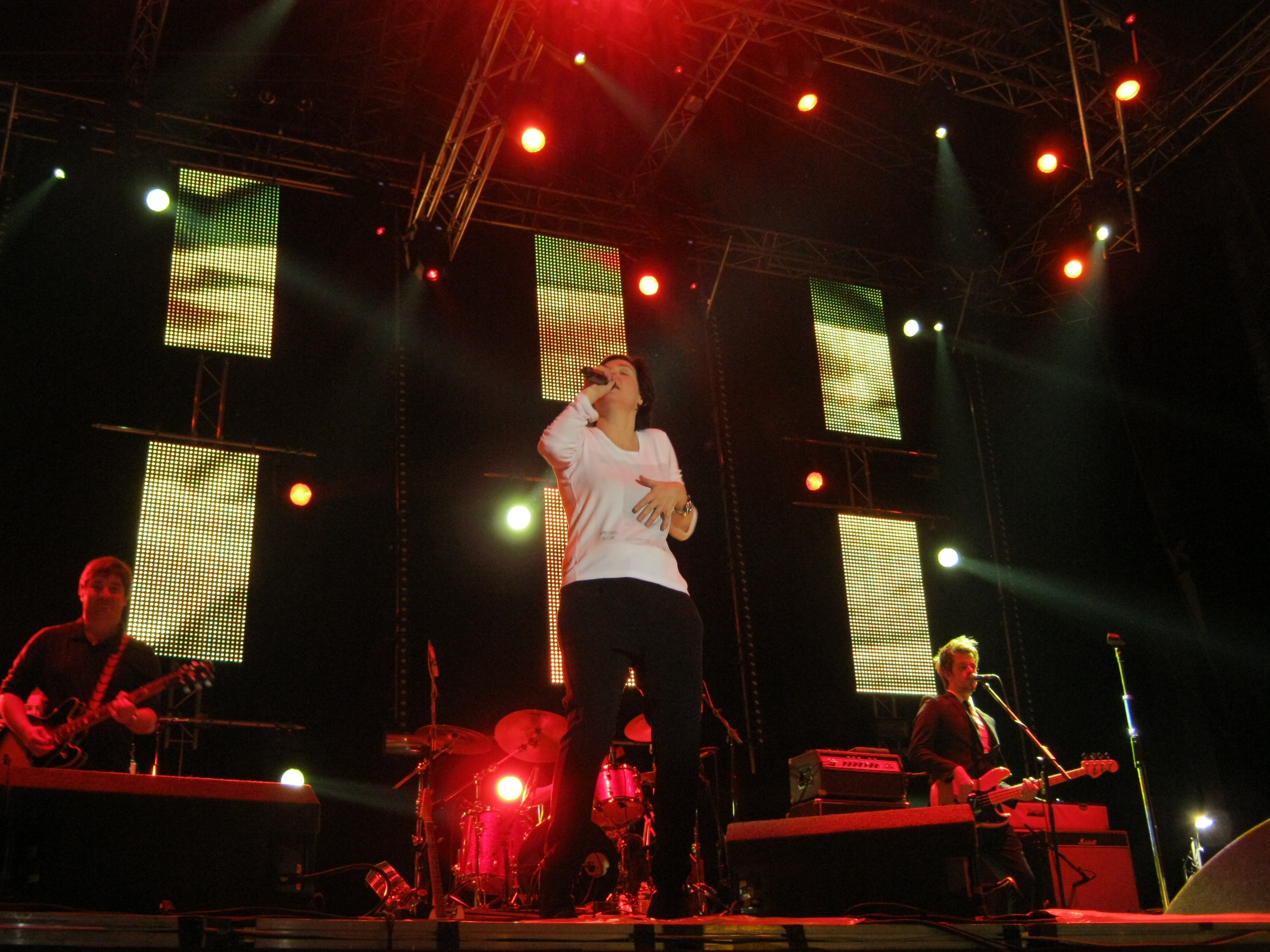
Texas performing live in July 2011

After McErlaine survived his collapse—which kills in 80% of cases—Texas reunited for the first time since 2005. The band embarked on a tour in 2011 and lead singer Spiteri appeared on Popstar to Operastar on 12 June 2011 singing a version of the band's hit "Say What You Want". Prior to this, Texas had played at the Den Fynske Landsby Festival in Denmark. At the festival, they debuted a new track "The Conversation" which marked the first time the track has been played outside their native Glasgow.

Spiteri was also invited to make a series of cameo appearances at different events, all of which involved film scores. She sang Yvonne Elliman's "If I Can't Have You" for a Saturday Night Fever tribute concert and duetted with Italian singer Mauro Gioia on the "Love Theme from The Godfather".

In February 2013, Music Week announced the band had signed a new record deal with PIAS Recordings and were to release their first new album since reuniting. The Conversation was released on 20 May 2013. Physical formats included a single disc and double-disc deluxe edition. The latter featured a bonus disc entitled Live in Scotland. Also in 2013, a UK tour was announced and the album launched at two gigs, one at King Tut's Wah Wah Hut in Glasgow and the other at the 100 Club in London. Spiteri performed a cover of "River Deep – Mountain High" at these gigs as well as a selection of new tracks from The Conversation. Tracks are written mainly by Spiteri and McElhone, with Richard Hawley and Bernard Butler as collaborators. The album's lead single of the same name joined BBC Radio 2's playlist in April 2013 with two more singles, "Detroit City" and "Dry Your Eyes", following later that year. The album is certified Platinum in France and peaked at No. 4 on the UK Albums Chart. In November 2014, Texas contributed to BBC Radio 2's Sounds of the 80s album with a cover of "Don't Talk to Me About Love" by Altered Images, a band which also included current Texas member Johnny McElhone in its lineup.

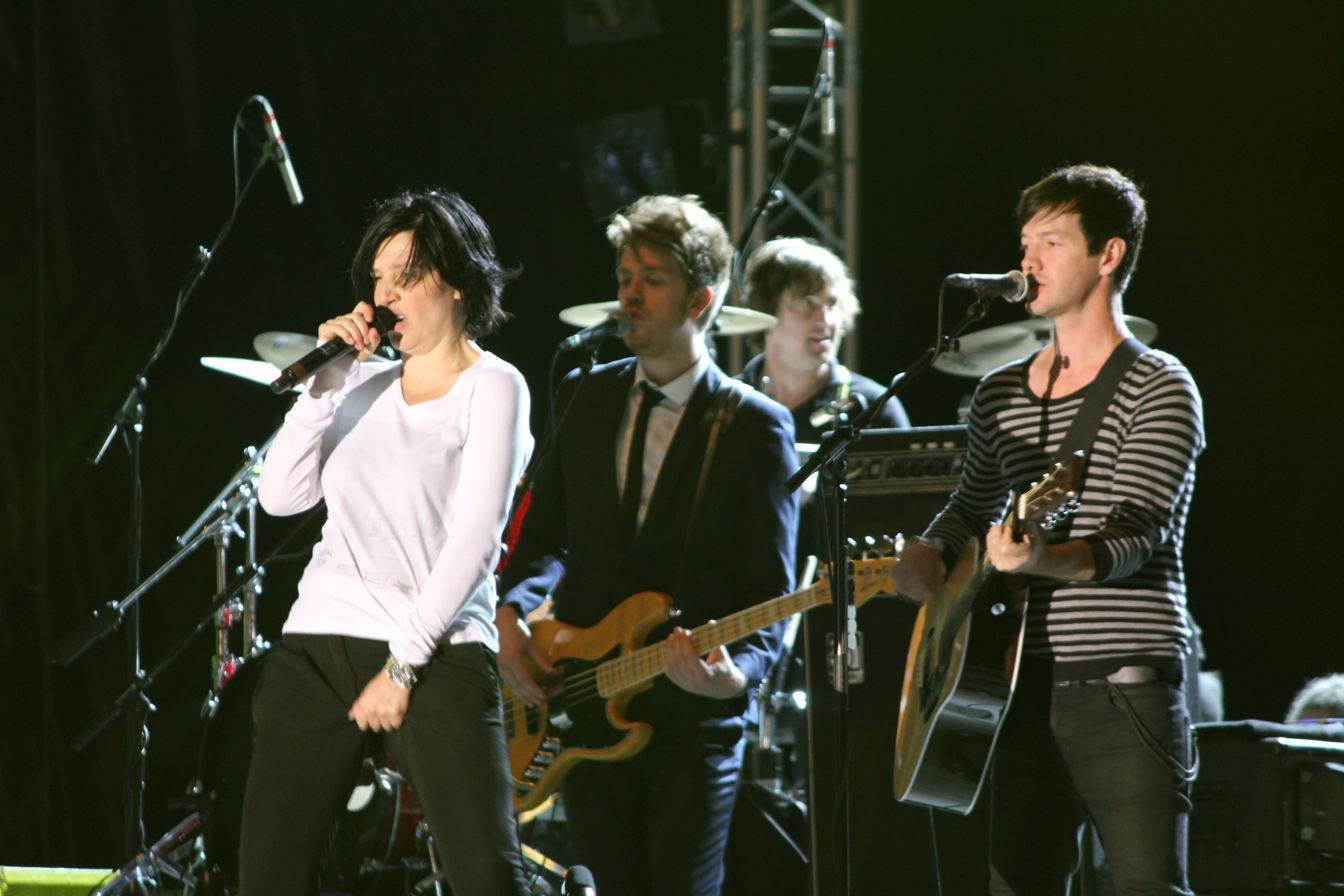
Texas at Festival Interceltique Lorient, 2011

To celebrate the band's 25th anniversary, it was announced that some of their biggest hits would be re-recorded for a new album entitled Texas 25. The collection features eight songs from the band's back catalogue completely reworked with the help of New York production team Truth & Soul, as well as four brand new songs, and was released on 16 February 2015. Deluxe packages include a second disc of the hits in their original form. The lead single, "Start a Family", premiered online on 6 January 2015. A music video followed, once again starring Alan Rickman who was previously featured in the video for "In Demand".

The band also embarked on a new UK tour throughout April and May 2015. An Evening with Texas was a more intimate arrangement than previous shows and featured stories told by Spiteri from the band's 25 years together.

=== 2017–present: Jump on Board and Hi ===
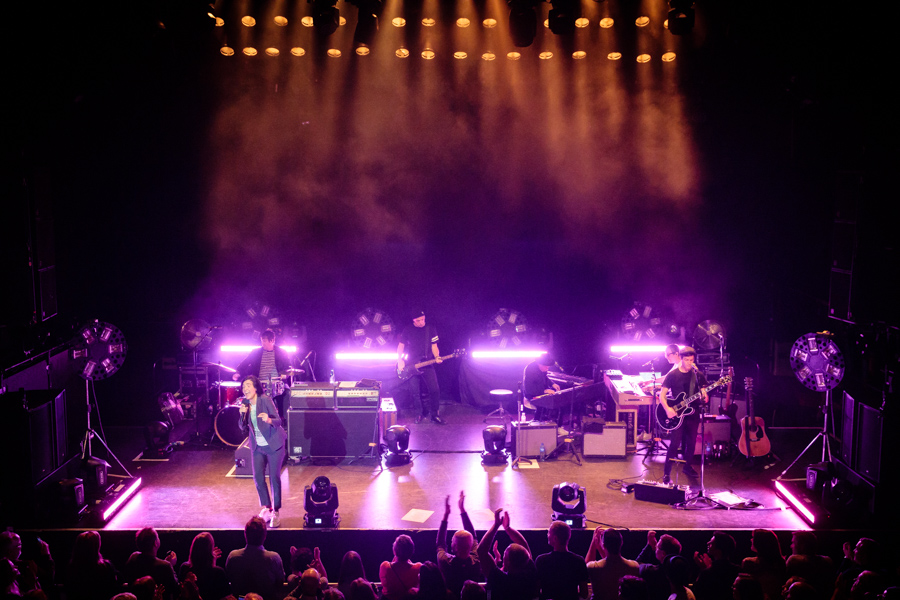
Texas performing on stage at Rockefeller Music Hall, 2018

The band released their ninth studio album, Jump on Board in May 2017 to critical acclaim, with "Let's Work it Out" serving as the lead single from the new album. Jump on Board performed well commercially in the band's native Scotland, debuting at number one on the Scottish Albums Chart. The album reached number one in France and performed well in the UK chart. In support of the album, the band embarked on the Jump on Board Live Tour world tour.

On 28 February 2020, the band announced on Twitter that its next album was called Hi, which was released on BMG on 28 May 2021. A single, also called "Hi", was released in December 2020 and reunited the band with the Wu-Tang Clan after 22 years. A video was released for the song with Small Axe actor Kadeem Ramsay, a promo video that also includes footage of Texas, RZA and Method Man performing "Say What You Want" at the BRIT Awards in 1998.

In April 2021, the second single from Hi was released. Called "Mr Haze", the track sampled the melody from "Love's Unkind" (which was a top-5 hit for Donna Summer in the late 1970s) and was performed on The One Show on BBC One. Hi is the tenth album released by Texas and includes collaborations with Richard Hawley and Altered Images' Clare Grogan, the latter duetting with Spiteri on the song "Look What You’ve Done".

Another career-spanning greatest hits collection, The Very Best of 1989–2023, was released on 16 June 2023. On 8 June 2023 Texas recorded a video documentary in association with ARTE at the Chateau d'Herouville. On 23 June 2023, the band played the Pyramid Stage at Glastonbury Festival, UK.

== Membership ==
Current members

- Sharleen Spiteri – lead vocals, guitar, keyboards (1988–present)
- Johnny McElhone – bass, guitar, keyboards (1988–present)
- Eddie Campbell – keyboards (1991–present)
- Tony McGovern – guitar, backing vocals (1999–present)
- Cat Myers – drums (2021–present)

Former members

- Ally McErlaine – guitar (1988–2022)
- Stuart Kerr – drums, backing vocals (1989–1991)
- Richard Hynd – drums (1991–1999)
- Mike Wilson – drums (1999–2001)
- Steve Washington – drums (2001–2003)
- Neil Payne – drums (2003–2006)
- Michael Bannister – keyboards (2005–2019)
- Ross McFarlane – drums (2011–2019)

== Discography ==
- Southside (1989)
- Mothers Heaven (1991)
- Ricks Road (1993)
- White on Blonde (1997)
- The Hush (1999)
- Careful What You Wish For (2003)
- Red Book (2005)
- The Conversation (2013)
- Jump on Board (2017)
- Hi (2021)

== Awards and nominations ==
=== Industry awards ===
BT Digital Music Awards

Year	Nominee / work	Award	Result	Ref.
2002	www.texasindemand.com	People's Choice Award	Nominated	

Brit Awards

Year	Nominee / work	Award	Result
1998	White on Blonde	MasterCard British Album	Nominated
1998	"Say What You Want"	Best British Single	Nominated
1998	Themselves	Best British Group	Nominated
2000	Themselves	Best British Group	Nominated
2001	"In Demand"	Best British Video	Nominated

Ivor Novello Awards

Year	Nominee / work	Award	Result
1998	"Say What You Want"	Most Performed Work	Nominated
1998	"Black Eyed Boy"	Most Performed Work	Nominated
1998	Themselves	Outstanding Song Collection	Won

MTV Europe Music Awards

Year	Nominee / work	Award	Result
1999	Themselves	Best UK & Ireland Act	Nominated

Music & Media Year-End Awards

Year	Nominee / work	Award	Result	Ref.
1989	Southside	Debut Album of the Year	2nd place	

Music Week Women in Music Awards

Year	Nominee / work	Award	Result
2017	Sharleen Spiteri	Inspirational Artist	Won

NME Awards

Year	Nominee / work	Award	Result
2003	Sharleen Spiteri	Sexiest Woman	Nominated
2005	Sharleen Spiteri	Sexiest Woman	Nominated

NRJ Music Awards

Year	Nominee / work	Award	Result	Ref.
2000	Themselves	International Duo/Group of the Year	Won	
2000	The Hush	International Album of the Year	Nominated	

Q Awards

Year	Nominee / work	Award	Result
1999	The Hush	Best Album	Nominated

Silver Clef Awards

Year	Nominee / work	Award	Result	Ref.
2024	Themselves	Outstanding Achievement	Won	

=== Public awards ===
Smash Hits Poll Winners Party

Year	Nominee / work	Award	Result
1989	Themselves	Most Promising New Group	Nominated
2000	Themselves	Best British Band	Nominated
