= Rusk (disambiguation) =

Rusk is a dry biscuit. It may also refer to:

== People ==
- Claude Ewing Rusk (1871-1931), author and mountaineer
- Dean Rusk (1909–1994), United States Secretary of State (1961–1969)
- Harry W. Rusk (1852–1926), American politician
- Jeremiah M. Rusk (1830–1893), American politician and U.S. Secretary of Agriculture (1889–1893)
- Lycurgus J. Rusk (1851-1928), American politician
- Rita Rusk (1947–2022), Scottish hairdresser
- Simon Rusk (born 1981), Scottish footballer
- Thomas Jefferson Rusk (1803–1857), Republic of Texas military officer and politician, U.S. Senator (1846–1857)

== Places in the United States ==
- Rusk, Indiana, an unincorporated community
- Rusk, Texas, a city
  - Rusk Independent School District
- Rusk, West Virginia, an unincorporated community
- Rusk, Burnett County, Wisconsin, a town
- Rusk, Dunn County, Wisconsin, an unincorporated community
- Rusk, Rusk County, Wisconsin, a town
- Rusk County, Texas
- Rusk County, Wisconsin
- Rusk Mountain, a peak in the Catskill Mountains, New York

== Other uses ==
- Rusk Incorporated, a maker of hair care products and devices
- Rusk Institute of Rehabilitation Medicine, part of New York University Medical Center; named for Dr. Howard A. Rusk
- Dell Rusk, U.S. Secretary of Defense, an alias of Red Skull, a Marvel Comics villain

== See also ==
- Rusk documents, diplomatic documents exchanged by the U.S. and Korea in the 1940s and 1950s
- Afroyim v. Rusk, a 1967 U.S. Supreme Court case
