= The BBC Sessions (Texas album) =

Studio album by Texas
- Released: 27 August 2007
- Recorded: 1989–2003
- Genre: Pop
- Length: 1:29:17
- Label: Universal

Texas chronology
Red Book (2005)	The BBC Sessions (2007)	The Conversation (2013)

The BBC Sessions by Texas was released on 24 September 2007. It contains 24 tracks recorded at the BBC studios in London.

Between 12 March 1989 and 18 October 2003, Texas recorded ten sessions for the BBC Radio network, selected highlights of which are featured on this collection.

Professional ratings
Review scores
Source	Rating
AllMusic	link

A Universal double CD exists from an earlier stage in the compilation process. It containing all the tracks on the final album and some additional tracks that were omitted from the final selection. On one known copy of the CDs, some but not all of these additional tracks are crossed out. The additional tracks were from taken from the same 10 sessions.

== Track listing ==
=== Disc 1 ===
No.	Title	Writer(s)	Recorded at (show/date)	Length
1.	"Thrill Has Gone"	Johnny McElhone, Sharleen Spiteri	Richard Skinner 12/3/89	4:16
2.	"Everyday Now"	McElhone, Spiteri	Richard Skinner 12/3/89	4:31
3.	"Future Is Promises"	McElhone, Spiteri, Alistair Manson McErlaine	Richard Skinner 12/3/89	3:43
4.	"Prayer for You"	McElhone, Spiteri	Richard Skinner 12/3/89	3:28
5.	"It Hurts Me Too"	Hudson Whitaker	Mark Goodier 8/4/89	2:49
6.	"Dream Hotel"	McElhone, Spiteri	Johnnie Walker 19/10/91	3:14
7.	"Alone with You"	McElhone, Spiteri	Johnnie Walker 19/10/91	3:03
8.	"Fade Away"	McElhone, Spiteri	Johnnie Walker 11/12/93	3:28
9.	"You Owe It All to Me"	McElhone, Spiteri	Johnnie Walker 11/12/93	3:25
10.	"I Want to Go to Heaven"	McElhone, Spiteri	Johnnie Walker 11/12/93	3:17
11.	"I've Got a Feeling"	John Lennon, Paul McCartney	Johnnie Walker 11/12/93	4:09
12.	"I Don't Want a Lover"	McElhone, Spiteri	Live Session 1/1/94	4:50
13.	"So in Love with You"	McElhone, Spiteri	Live Session 1/1/94	4:19
14.	"Tired of Being Alone"	Al Green	Live Session 1/1/94	3:04

=== Disc 2 ===
No.	Title	Writer(s)	Recorded at (show/date)	Length
1.	"Insane"	McElhone, Spiteri	Mary Anne Hobbs 7/5/97	4:51
2.	"Say What You Want"	McElhone, Spiteri	Mary Anne Hobbs 7/5/97	3:52
3.	"You're All I Need to Get By"	Valerie Simpson, Nickolas Ashford	Mary Anne Hobbs 7/5/97	4:12
4.	"Black Eyed Boy"	McElhone, Spiteri, Eddie Campbell, Richard Hynd, Robert Hodgens	Jo Whiley 19/12/97	3:29
5.	"Halo"	McElhone, Spiteri	Jo Whiley 19/12/97	3:54
6.	"Tell Me the Answer"	McElhone, Spiteri, Hodgens	Simon Mayo 13/4/99	3:22
7.	"In Our Lifetime"	McElhone, Spiteri	Simon Mayo 13/4/99	3:36
8.	"Carnival Girl"	McElhone, Spiteri, Jason Harrow	Chris Moyles 7/10/03	3:47
9.	"Say What You Want"	McElhone, Spiteri	Chris Moyles 7/10/03	3:21
10.	"I'll See It Through"	McElhone, Spiteri, Guy Chambers	Jonathan Ross 18/10/03	3:17

== Track listing for Universal work in progress CD ==
=== Disc 1 ===
No.	Title	Writer(s)	Recorded at (show/date)	Length
1.	"Thrill Has Gone"	Johnny McElhone, Sharleen Spiteri	Richard Skinner 12/3/89	4:16
2.	"Everyday Now"	McElhone, Spiteri	Richard Skinner 12/3/89	4:31
3.	"Future Is Promised"	McElhone, Spiteri, Alistair Manson McErlaine	Richard Skinner 12/3/89	3:43
4.	"Prayer for You"	McElhone, Spiteri	Richard Skinner 12/3/89	3:28
5.	"Everyday Now"	McElhone, Spiteri	Mark Goodier 8/4/89	4:45
6.	"The Truth Is Gone"	McElhone, Spiteri	Mark Goodier 8/4/89	4:03
7.	"A Prayer For You"	McElhone, Spiteri	Mark Goodier 8/4/89	3:40
8.	"It Hurts Me Too"	Hudson Whitaker	Mark Goodier 8/4/89	2:49
9.	"Dream Hotel"	McElhone, Spiteri	Johnnie Walker 19/10/91	3:14
10.	"Alone with You"	McElhone, Spiteri	Johnnie Walker 19/10/91	3:03
11.	"Fade Away"	McElhone, Spiteri	Johnnie Walker 11/12/93	3:28
12.	"You Owe It All to Me"	McElhone, Spiteri	Johnnie Walker 11/12/93	3:25
13.	"I Want to Go to Heaven"	McElhone, Spiteri	Johnnie Walker 11/12/93	3:17
14.	"I've Got a Feeling"	John Lennon, Paul McCartney	Johnnie Walker 11/12/93	4:09

=== Disc 2 ===
No.	Title	Writer(s)	Recorded at (show/date)	Length
1.	"I Don't Want a Lover"	McElhone, Spiteri	Texas Live Session 01/01/1994	4:50
2.	"So in Love with You"	McElhone, Spiteri	Texas Live Session 01/01/1994	4:19
3.	"Tired of Being Alone"	Al Green	Texas Live Session 01/01/1994	3:04
4.	"You Owe It All to Me"	McElhone, Spiteri	Texas Live Session 01/01/1994	3:37
5.	"Black Eyed Boy"	McElhone, Spiteri, Eddie Campbell, Richard Hynd, Robert Hodgens	Mary Anne Hobbs 7/5/97	3:24
6.	"Insane"	McElhone, Spiteri	Mary Anne Hobbs 7/5/97	4:51
7.	"Say What You Want"	McElhone, Spiteri	Mary Anne Hobbs 7/5/97	3:52
8.	"You're All I Need to Get By"	Valerie Simpson, Nickolas Ashford	Mary Anne Hobbs 7/5/97	4:12
9.	"Say What You Want"	McElhone, Spiteri	Jo Whiley 19/12/97	4:01
10.	"Black Eyed Boy"	McElhone, Spiteri, Eddie Campbell, Richard Hynd, Robert Hodgens	Jo Whiley 19/12/97	3:29
11.	"Halo"	McElhone, Spiteri	Jo Whiley 19/12/97	3:54
12.	"Tell Me the Answer"	McElhone, Spiteri, Hodgens	Simon Mayo 13/04/1999	3:22
13.	"Black Eyed Boy"	McElhone, Spiteri, Eddie Campbell, Richard Hynd, Robert Hodgens	Simon Mayo 13/04/1999	3:29
14.	"In Our Lifetime"	McElhone, Spiteri	Simon Mayo 13/04/1999	3:36
15.	"Carnival Girl"	McElhone, Spiteri, Jason Harrow	Chris Moyles 07/10/2003	3:47
16.	"Say What You Want"	McElhone, Spiteri	Chris Moyles 07/10/2003	3:21
17.	"I'll See It Through"	McElhone, Spiteri, Guy Chambers	Jonathan Ross 18/10/2003	3:17

On the CD sleeve for CD1, the following tracks were crossed out, track 5, "Every Day Now" and track 7, "A Prayer For You". There were also some spelling errors, "Future Is Promises" being titled "Future Is Promised" and "The Thrill Has Gone" being titled "The Truth Is Gone" on track 6 but correctly titled for track 1.

On the CD sleeve for CD2, the following tracks were crossed out, track 5, "You Owe It All To Me"; track 6, "Black Eyed Boy"; track 10, "Say What You Want" and track 13, "Black Eyed Boy". On CD2, in-between track 10, "Blacked Eyed Boy" and track 11, "Halo", was listed "River". This however was not on the CD. The Simon Mayo Session was listed twice in error but only appears on the CD once.
