= Rita Rusk =

Scottish hairdresser (1947–2022)

Rita Rusk (22 June 1947 – 28 December 2022) was a Scottish hairdresser. She began her training at the age of 16 and bought her own salon in the 1970s which she operated with her husband, Irvine Rusk. Rita grew the business to four salons and a training school as well as developing new hairdressing scissors and hair straighteners (the design for which she sold to Babyliss). In 1987 Rusk became the first woman to be awarded the title of British Hairdresser of the Year. She separated from Irvine in the late 1980s and in 2009 three of her salons were closed due to financial difficulties.

== Life and career ==
Rusk was born in the Gorbals, Glasgow, on 22 June 1947. She was the daughter of Peggy and Francis Murphy, a car salesman, and had nine siblings. As a child Rusk aspired to become an air stewardess so she could travel the world but her first paid employment was on a fruit and vegetable market stall. The family moved from the tenements of the Gorbals to the Castlemilk housing estate, built in the 1950s, and Rusk was educated at the Holyrood Secondary School.

Rusk trained as a hairdresser from the age of 16 in a salon owned by a cousin on Bath Street in Blythswood Hill, central Glasgow. She married fellow hairdresser Irvine Rusk in 1969, with whom she bought a salon in Hamilton, South Lanarkshire in the 1970s. The couple's only child was born in 1975. The Rusks were keen to expand their business and to further this aim appeared at London hairdressing shows such as the 1976 Salon International where they exhibited a style they named the butterfly. They went on to open other salons in Glasgow, East Kilbride and Clarkston.

In 1984 she developed waving scissors with "alpha, beta, gamma and delta blades". In 1986 she developed a smaller version of hair straighteners with flat irons, designed as a more user-friendly product for home use, and sold the design to Babyliss. Rusk became the first woman to win the title of British Hairdresser of the Year in 1987, jointly awarded with her husband, the pair were also the first Scots to win the title. The couple separated in the late 1980s with Irvine moving to the United States where he founded the Rusk hair care brand.

Rusk's clients included Katharine, Duchess of Kent and the actress Greta Scacchi. Sharleen Spiteri worked as a trainee in one of Rusk's salons before pursuing a music career as lead singer of the rock band Texas; who went on to employ Rusk as her hair stylist. Rusk was named the world's best hairdresser four times by the French magazine Metamorphose. She a married lawyer in the 1990s.

Rusk's business, Rita Rusk International, operated the salons in Hamilton, East Kilbride, and Clarkston as well as a hairdressing school that attracted international students. She and her husband had lent the business £500,000 but it was in difficulties by 2009, owing HM Revenue and Customs (HMRC) £80,000 in unpaid tax. HMRC submitted a winding-up petition that was granted by the Glasgow Sheriff Court and the company was liquidated in 2010. The salon and trading name were purchased by a local couple, Rusk's remaining salon, in Glasgow, was owned by a separate company and continued to operate.

Rusk's husband died in 2014 and she afterwards moved to the West End of Glasgow. She died in Glasgow on 28 December 2022, having suffered from kidney disease for a long time. Following Rusk's death the Fellowship for British Hairdressing described her as a "legend" and a "true innovator".
