= Melody (Sharleen Spiteri album) =

Studio album by Sharleen Spiteri
- Released: 14 July 2008
- Recorded: 2007–2008
- Genre: Pop, soul
- Length: 36:57
- Label: Mercury, Universal Music
- Producer: Sharleen Spiteri, Bernard Butler, George Miller

Sharleen Spiteri chronology
Melody (2008)	The Movie Songbook (2010)

Singles from Melody
- 1. "All the Times I Cried" Released: 7 July 2008; 2. "Stop, I Don't Love You Anymore" Released: 6 October 2008; 3. "It Was You" Released: 1 December 2008

Melody is the debut solo album by Scottish singer Sharleen Spiteri, lead singer of the band Texas. It was released on 14 July 2008 and was preceded by the release of its lead single "All the Times I Cried", which was released on 7 July 2008. The album is heavily influenced by 1960s era style music, and draws influences from Nancy Sinatra and Johnny Cash. Despite being considered a risky genre to launch her solo career, the album was a commercial success, debuting at number two on the albums charts in her native Scotland, number three in the United Kingdom and reaching the top twenty in France, Belgium and Ireland.

It was supported by the release of a further two singles – "Stop, I Don't Love You Anymore" and "It Was You", and was eventually certified Gold in the United Kingdom for sales in excess of 100,000 copies. It became the 87th best selling album of 2008 in the United Kingdom.

== Background and reception ==
Sharleen Spiteri is the lead vocalist for Scottish rock band Texas, who, following the release of their seventh studio album Red Book in 2005, announced they would begin an "indefinite hiatus". The album is influenced by artists including Nancy Sinatra and Johnny Cash, as well as Motown genre style influences. As a result, this marked a new musical direction for Spiteri and from the alternative rock sound she had recorded with Texas. Spiteri said that being away from the commitments of being the lead vocalist for Texas allowed her to "make the album I always dreamed of making". The lyrical composition throughout Melody was heavily influenced by the breakdown of her relationship with Ashley Heath, the father of her daughter.

Spiteri described the album as her "ultimate personal fantasy record", in which Digital Spy claimed that Spiteri must have "been dreaming about "lush, melodramatic pop music from the fifties and sixties". Her decision to record an album heavily influenced by 1960s era music was considered risky by a commercial point of view, but was considered to have "lots in common" with Back to Black by Amy Winehouse and Rockferry by Duffy, both of which were major commercial successes. Michael Quinn from the BBC praised Spiteri's vocals on Melody and highly commended her "distinctive burnt caramel carapace pulling at the heartstrings as effectively as ever". Quinn drew comparisons between "It Was You" and Welsh singer Duffy's "Mercy" which was also released in 2008.

== Release and promotion ==
The lead single from Melody, "All The Times I Cried" was released on 7 July 2008 in the United Kingdom and debuted on the UK Singles Chart at number 47, before rising to 26 with the physical release. Melody was released the following week on 14 July, and debuted at number two on the albums charts in her native Scotland and number three in the United Kingdom. The album was certified Gold in the United Kingdom by the British Phonographic Industry (BPI) for sales of over 100,000 copies. The second single to be released from the album, "Stop, I Don't Love You Anymore" was released on 6 October 2008 - and failed to match the moderate commercial success of the lead single. The third and final single, "It Was You", was released on 1 December 2008.

"Don't Keep Me Waiting" was only released in Switzerland and charted at number 78. The song featured on the soundtrack for The L Word, an American television series. In 2008, she announced a debut solo tour to promote Melody which began in 2009, and appeared on television productions including Later with Jools Holland, The Charlotte Church Show and Transmission to promote the album. Additionally, Spiteri also performed radio sessions on BBC Radio 2 and Virgin Radio, and in 2009, played the main stage of Scottish music festival T in the Park.

== Track listing ==
No.	Title	Writer(s)	Producer(s)	Length
1.	"It Was You"	Sharleen Spiteri, Johnny McElhone, Bernard Butler	Bernard Butler, Sharleen Spiteri	3:15
2.	"All the Times I Cried"	Spiteri, McElhone	Sharleen Spiteri	3:24
3.	"Stop, I Don't Love You Anymore"	Spiteri, McElhone	Sharleen Spiteri	3:04
4.	"Melody"	Serge Gainsbourg, Spiteri	Sharleen Spiteri	3:51
5.	"I Wonder"	Spiteri, McElhone	Sharleen Spiteri	3:46
6.	"I'm Going to Haunt You"	Spiteri, George Miller	Sharleen Spiteri, George Miller	2:33
7.	"Don't Keep Me Waiting"	Spiteri, McElhone, Dante Gizzi, Giulano Gizzi	Sharleen Spiteri	3:14
8.	"You Let Me Down"	Spiteri, Miller	Sharleen Spiteri, George Miller	3:07
9.	"Where Did It Go Wrong"	Spiteri	Sharleen Spiteri	3:07
10.	"Day Tripping"	Spiteri, McElhone, Jack McElhone	Sharleen Spiteri	4:12
11.	"Françoise"	Spiteri	Sharleen Spiteri	3:32

- "Melody" contains a sample from the recording "Jane B" performed by Jane Birkin and Serge Gainsbourg (taken from the album Jane Birkin/Serge Gainsbourg) written by Serge Gainsbourg.
- A non-CD track called "That Was a Lie" was recorded and made available for early download from Spiteri's website but did not make the final track listing.

== Personnel ==
- Sharleen Spiteri - vocals, guitar, piano, percussion, backing vocals
- Johnny McElhone - bass
- Michael Bannister - drums, keyboards, piano, programming
- Ross Hamilton - bass, guitar, piano, backing vocals
- Tom MacNiven - trumpet
- Bogus Kostecki, Chris Tombling, David Woodcock, Emlyn Singleton, Everton Nelson, Jonathan Rees, Julian Leaper, Patrick Kiernan, Peter Hanson, Steve Morris, Tom Pigott-Smith, Warren Zielinski - violin
- Bruce White, Katie Wilkinson, Peter Lale - viola
- Anthony Pleeth, Caroline Dale, Ian Burdge - cello
- Paul Leonard Morgan - string arrangements

with:

- Bernard Butler - guitar, piano
- Makoto Sakamoto - drums, percussion
- David McAlmont - harmony vocals
- Leon Michels - saxophone, piano
- Allon Beauvoisin - baritone saxophone
- Jim Hunt - saxophone
- Dominic Glover, Michael Leonhart - trumpet
- Nichol Thomson - trombone
- Sally Herbert - string arrangement, violin
- Louisa Fuller - violin

Technical

- Aboud Creative - art direction, design
- Julian Broad - photography

== Charts ==
=== Weekly charts ===
Chart (2008)	Peak position
Belgian Albums (Ultratop Flanders)	15
Belgian Albums (Ultratop Wallonia)	18
French Albums (SNEP)	13
Irish Albums (IRMA)	19
Scottish Albums (OCC)	2
Swiss Albums (Schweizer Hitparade)	19
UK Albums (OCC)	3
Scottish Albums (OCC)	2

=== Year-end charts ===
Chart (2008)	Position
French Albums (SNEP)	191
UK Albums (OCC)	87

== Certifications ==
Certifications for Melody
Region	Certification	Certified units/sales
United Kingdom (BPI)	Gold	100,000^{^}
^{^} Shipments figures based on certification alone.
