= Inner Smile =

2001 single by Texas

- UK CD2 artwork

Single by Texas

from the album The Greatest Hits
- B-side: "Across the Universe"
- Released: 8 January 2001
- Length: 3:52
- Label: Mercury
- Songwriters: Johnny McElhone; Sharleen Spiteri; Gregg Alexander; Rick Nowels
- Producers: Johnny Mac; Gregg Alexander

Texas singles chronology
"In Demand" (2000)	"Inner Smile" (2001)	"I Don't Want a Lover" (2001)

Music video
- "Inner Smile" on YouTube

"Inner Smile" is a song by Scottish alternative rock band Texas, originally released on their greatest hits album, The Greatest Hits (2000). Written by Gregg Alexander and Rick Nowels and arranged by Texas, the song is based on Alexander's unreleased demo "Inner Child", which was written and performed between 1995 and 1998.

"Inner Smile" was scheduled to be released on 25 December 2000, but it was delayed to 8 January 2001, when it was issued as the second single from The Greatest Hits. The song peaked at No. 6 on the UK Singles Chart, reached No. 8 in Spain, and charted within the top 20 in Ireland, Italy, and the Netherlands.

== Music video ==
The video, directed by Vaughan Arnell, is an homage to Elvis Presley (and specifically his '68 Comeback Special) with lead singer Sharleen Spiteri dressed as Elvis in his famous black leather suit and using prosthetics to resemble Elvis. It begins with Sharleen/Elvis turning on a TV (probably to see "the show", i.e. the video clip), then she/he begins to sing. It had some black and white stills showing her in distinct situations (in one of them, Sharleen/Elvis proudly holds a belt with the word "SHAR" instead of "ELVIS", formed with diamonds). In some scenes, she switches from her Elvis costume to another black leather outfit (without prosthetics). The video clip was shot in London in November 2000 with a live audience and with the band members playing different roles as musicians and/or audience members (with Spiteri portraying various groupies). In one of the scenes, Sharleen (as Elvis) sings along with Sharleen. It is often assumed this scene represents Elvis and Priscilla Presley.

== Track listings ==
UK CD1

1. "Inner Smile" – 3:49
2. "Inner Smile" (extended 12-inch) – 9:47
3. "Across the Universe" – 4:13
4. "Inner Smile" (video)

UK CD2

1. "Inner Smile" – 3:49
2. "Inner Smile" (Jules' Club Radio Mix) – 4:35
3. "Inner Smile" (Stonebridge Classic House Mix) – 6:31
4. "Inner Smile" (Rae & Christian Basement Mix) – 4:57

UK cassette single

A1. "Inner Smile" – 3:49
A2. "Inner Smile" (Moody Mix) – 4:36
B1. "Inner Smile" (Stonebridge Classic House Mix) – 7:20

European CD single

1. "Inner Smile" – 3:49
2. "I Don't Want a Lover" (live) – 5:30

Australian CD single

1. "Inner Smile" – 3:49
2. "Inner Smile" (Stonebridge Classic House Mix) – 7:21
3. "Tired of Being Alone" – 3:27
4. "Across the Universe" – 4:13
5. "Inner Smile" (video)

== Personnel ==
Personnel are lifted from The Greatest Hits album booklet.

- Johnny McElhone – writing, keyboards, production (as Johnny Mac)
- Sharleen Spiteri – writing, backing vocals
- Gregg Alexander – writing, production
- Rick Nowels – writing, backing vocals, keyboards
- Eddie Campbell – backing vocals, keyboards
- Ally McErlaine – guitars
- Wayne Rodrigues – drum programming
- Ash Howes – mixing

== Charts ==
=== Weekly charts ===
Chart (2000–2001)	Peak position
Australia (ARIA)	93
Austria (Ö3 Austria Top 40)	57
Belgium (Ultratop 50 Flanders)	47
Belgium (Ultratop 50 Wallonia)	37
Croatia International Airplay (HRT)	1
Europe (Eurochart Hot 100)	29
France (SNEP)	37
Germany (GfK)	36
Ireland (IRMA)	17
Italy (FIMI)	17
Netherlands (Dutch Top 40)	14
Netherlands (Single Top 100)	27
Romania (Romanian Top 100)	6
Scottish Singles Sales (Official Charts)	5
Spain (Promusicae)	8
Sweden (Sverigetopplistan)	26
Switzerland (Schweizer Hitparade)	27
UK Singles (Official Charts)	6

=== Year-end charts ===
Chart (2001)	Position
Romania (Romanian Top 100)	83
UK Singles (OCC)	174

== Certifications ==
Region	Certification	Certified units/sales
United Kingdom (BPI)	Gold	400,000^{‡}
^{‡} Sales+streaming figures based on certification alone.
