= Sleep (Texas song) =

2006 single by Texas

Single by Texas

from the album Red Book
- B-side: "Pass You By"; "Take Your Mama" (live)
- Released: 9 January 2006
- Length: 4:09
- Label: Mercury
- Songwriters: Johnny McElhone; Sharleen Spiteri
- Producer: Johnny Mac

Texas singles chronology
"Can't Resist" (2005)	"Sleep" (2006)	"The Conversation" (2013)

"Sleep" is a song by Scottish band Texas, released as the third and final single from their seventh studio album, Red Book (2005), on 9 January 2006. The male vocals on the song were performed by Paul Buchanan from fellow Scottish musical group the Blue Nile. "Sleep" was released on 9 January 2006 in three different formats: two audio CD singles and a DVD single. The song peaked at number six on the UK Singles Chart, and as of 2026, it remains their last UK top-40 hit.

"Take Your Mama" from CD2 is a cover version of the song by Scissor Sisters. A free, limited-edition slip-case was made available by mail to house all three formats.

== Music video ==
The music video was directed by Peter Kay and featured him as Marc Park (which he previously portrayed in two episodes of That Peter Kay Thing). The video also features Sian Gibson. The scenes, which are set in a school, were filmed at Harper Green School, in Farnworth, Bolton. The video features spoofs of the clay-sculpting moment from the 1984 Lionel Richie music video for "Hello", the pottery scene from the 1990 film Ghost, and the ending of the 1982 film An Officer and a Gentleman, where Richard Gere picks up Debra Winger.

== Track listings ==
UK CD1

1. "Sleep"
2. "Sleep" (Bimbo Jones Remix)

UK CD2

1. "Sleep"
2. "Pass You By"
3. "Take Your Mama" (live)

UK DVD single

1. "Sleep" (video)
2. "Here We Stay"
3. Making of the video—picture gallery

== Charts ==
=== Weekly charts ===
Chart (2006)	Peak position
Ireland (IRMA)	37
Scotland Singles (OCC)	4
UK Singles (OCC)	6

=== Year-end charts ===
Chart (2006)	Position
UK Singles (OCC)	171
