= The Movie Songbook =

Studio album by Sharleen Spiteri
- Released: 1 March 2010
- Recorded: 2009
- Genres: Pop, soul, country, disco, bossa nova, folk, rockabilly, jazz
- Length: 43:03
- Labels: Mercury, Universal Music
- Producers: Phil Ramone, Sharleen Spiteri, Johnny McElhone

Sharleen Spiteri chronology
Melody (2008)	The Movie Songbook (2010)

Singles from The Movie Songbook
- 1. "Xanadu" Released: February 2010

Professional ratings
Review scores
Source	Rating
Allmusic	2/5 stars
Digital Spy	2/5 stars
Daily Express	4/5
Record Collector	3/5 stars

The Movie Songbook is the second studio album by Scottish singer-songwriter Sharleen Spiteri. It was released on 1 March 2010. The album consists of film song covers, chosen and recorded by Spiteri in 2009.

== Overview ==
Spiteri had not intended to record another solo album following her debut, but instead return to working with her band Texas. On preparing to write however, she found it difficult to return to their soft rock style. At her record company's suggestion, she agreed to do a cover version album. The songs selected were Spiteri's own choices and she was happy with the outcome of the recordings.

On release however, the album met with a poor critical reception. Digitalspy.co.uk said of the album that: "A fair chunk of the song selection is so pedestrian it deserves its own crossing" and that the songs are "completely undone by their horrific arrangements". Allmusic said the album sounded "half-hearted" and like "karaoke" in a mostly negative review, but did comment on her "unquestionable singing talents".

The album failed to capture the success of her previous album, but still managed to hit the UK top 20 at number 13. "Xanadu" was released as the lead single.

== Track listing ==
Standard release
No.	Title	Writer(s)	Original artist	Length
1.	"Xanadu" (originally featured on Xanadu)	Jeff Lynne	Electric Light Orchestra and Olivia Newton-John	3:31
2.	"If I Can't Have You" (originally featured on Saturday Night Fever)	Barry Gibb, Robin Gibb, Maurice Gibb	Yvonne Elliman / The Bee Gees	2:38
3.	"God Bless the Child" (song used in Schindler's List)	Billie Holiday, Arthur Herzog Jr.	Billie Holiday	3:47
4.	"Between the Bars" (originally featured on Good Will Hunting)	Elliott Smith	Elliott Smith	2:45
5.	"The Sound of Silence" (song used in The Graduate)	Paul Simon	Simon & Garfunkel	3:21
6.	"What's New Pussycat?" (originally featured on What's New Pussycat?)	Burt Bacharach, Hal David	Tom Jones	2:41
7.	"The Windmills of Your Mind" (originally featured on The Thomas Crown Affair)	Michel Legrand, Alan and Marilyn Bergman	Noel Harrison	4:46
8.	"Take Me with You" (originally featured on Purple Rain)	Prince	Prince and Apollonia Kotero	2:57
9.	"Cat People (Putting Out Fire)" (originally featured on Cat People)	Giorgio Moroder, David Bowie	David Bowie	3:21
10.	"Many Rivers to Cross" (originally featured on The Harder They Come)	Jimmy Cliff	Jimmy Cliff	3:55
11.	"Oh, Pretty Woman" (song used in Pretty Woman)	Roy Orbison, Bill Dees	Roy Orbison	2:18
12.	"This One's from the Heart" (originally featured on One from the Heart)	Tom Waits, Crystal Gayle	Tom Waits and Crystal Gayle	3:33
13.	"Take My Breath Away" (originally featured on Top Gun)	Giorgio Moroder, Tom Whitlock	Berlin	3:30
Total length:				43:03

== Chart performance ==
Chart (2010)	Peak position
Scottish Albums Charts	4
UK Albums Chart	13
French Albums Chart	28
Belgium Albums Chart (Vl)	27
Belgium Albums Chart (Wa)	57

== Personnel ==
- Produced by Phil Ramone, Sharleen Spiteri and Johnny McElhone
- Recorded by Al Schmitt
- Mixed by Johnny McElhone, except tracks 1 and 2 mixed by Tom Elmhirst
