= All the Times I Cried =

Single by Sharleen Spiteri

from the album Melody
- B-side: "When Did You Leave Heaven"
- Released: 7 July 2008 (United Kingdom)
- Recorded: 2008
- Genre: Pop rock, soul
- Length: 3:27
- Label: Mercury Universal Music
- Songwriter(s): Sharleen Spiteri; Johnny McElhone
- Producer(s): Sharleen Spiteri

Sharleen Spiteri singles chronology
"All the Times I Cried" (2008)	"Stop, I Don't Love You Anymore" (2008)

"All the Times I Cried" is the debut solo single by Scottish singer Sharleen Spiteri, lead singer of the band Texas. It was released as the lead single from her debut solo album, Melody (2008). It was digitally released in the UK on 30 June 2008 and physically released on 7 July 2008. The song received a Neilson award for gaining more than 10,000 plays on radio stations throughout the United Kingdom, and was "A–listed" by BBC Radio 2.

== Release and promotion ==
The song was recorded during the sessions for Spiteri's debut solo album which began following the announcement of an "indefinite hiatus" by her band Texas which was confirmed following the release and promotional schedule for their seventh album Red Book in 2005. The song was written by both Spiteri and her Texas band mate Johnny McElhone. Released in July 2008, one week prior to the release of Melody, it achieved moderate commercial success, reaching number five on the singles charts in her native Scotland. In the United Kingdom, it reached number twenty–six on the official singles charts, whilst it reached number twenty-eight on the UK Singles Downloads Chart and number nine on the UK Physical Singles Charts.

To promote the release of "All the Times I Cried" and Melody, Spiteri appeared on television productions including Later with Jools Holland, The Charlotte Church Show and Transmission to promote the album. Additionally, Spiteri also performed radio sessions on BBC Radio 2 and Virgin Radio, and in 2009, played the main stage of Scottish music festival T in the Park.

== Track listing ==
1. "All the Times I Cried"
2. "When Did You Leave Heaven"

== Music video ==
The music video shows Spiteri having a conversation with a lover over the telephone, potentially breaking up with her. She is heard saying, "I just can't do it anymore". Following this, viewers see two other girls auditioning for a singing role in French Theatre, while Spiteri snoops around looking sad, and then performs - impressing the judges.

== Charts ==
Chart (2008)	Peak position
Scotland (OCC)	5
United Kingdom (OCC)	26
United Kingdom Singles Download (OCC)	28
United Kingdom Physical Singles (OCC)	9
Belgium (Ultratop 50 Flanders)	47
Belgium (Ultratop 50 Wallonia)	35
Switzerland (Schweizer Hitparade)	69
Europe Hot 100 Singles (Billboard)	80
