= In Our Lifetime (Texas song) =

1999 single by Texas

Single by Texas

from the album The Hush
- B-side: "Love Dream #2"
- Released: 12 April 1999
- Studio: Shar's house, Park Lane (Glasgow, Scotland)
- Genre: Pop rock; swingbeat
- Length: 4:10
- Label: Mercury
- Songwriters: Johnny McElhone; Sharleen Spiteri
- Producer: Johnny Mac

Texas singles chronology
"Say What You Want (All Day, Every Day)" / "Insane" (1998)	"In Our Lifetime" (1999)	"Summer Son" (1999)

Music video
- "In Our Lifetime" on YouTube

"In Our Lifetime" is a song by Scottish pop rock band Texas. The first single from their fifth studio album, The Hush (1999), it was released on 12 April 1999 in Europe and on 19 April in the United Kingdom. The song peaked at number four on the UK Singles Chart and became the band's second number one on the Scottish Singles Chart. It was also included on the soundtrack of the 1999 romantic comedy Notting Hill.

== Background ==
Texas lead singer Sharleen Spiteri commented on the song:

"I think it's pretty important to say, 'Once in a lifetime, you have seen what I've seen/You will always swim for shore.' To me, that's a personally important lyric and that's how I write. I'm talking about a relationship where, for the first time, I've met someone who's the same as me. You don't find that often: this person who challenges the thoughts I challenge other people with. That's why I refer to it being once in a lifetime."

— Sharleen Spiteri,

== Critical reception ==
A reviewer from Daily Record viewed the song as "brilliant". In his review of The Hush, Stephen Dalton from NME wrote that "these 12 tracks perform their ear-soothing job with ruthless efficiency", noting the "opulent swingbeat trundle" of "In Our Lifetime". Sunday Mercury described it as a "great Hong Kong Garden pastiche".

== Track listings ==
- UK CD1
1. "In Our Lifetime"
2. "In Our Lifetime" (Jules' Disco Trip Mix)
3. "In Our Lifetime" (Return To Tha Dub Mix)
- UK CD2
1. "In Our Lifetime" (enhanced version)
2. "Love Dream #2"
3. "In Our Lifetime" (Aim Mix)
4. "In Our Lifetime" (enhanced version video)
- UK cassette single
1. "In Our Lifetime"
2. "Love Dream #2"
- European and Australian CD single
1. "In Our Lifetime"
2. "Love Dream #2"
3. "In Our Lifetime" (Jules' Disco Trip Mix)
4. "In Our Lifetime" (Return To Tha Dub Mix)
- German CD single
1. "In Our Lifetime" – 4:10
2. "In Our Lifetime" (Jules' Disco Trip Mix) – 6:32
3. "Say What You Want" – 3:50
4. "I Don't Want a Lover" – 5:00

== Credits and personnel ==
Credits are lifted from The Hush album booklet.

Studios

- Recorded at Shar's house and Park Lane (Glasgow, Scotland)
- Mixed at the Mix Suite, Olympic Studios (London, England)

Personnel

- Texas – all instruments, programming
  - Johnny McElhone – writing, production (as Johnny Mac)
  - Sharleen Spiteri – writing
  - Eddie Campbell
  - Ally McErlaine
- Kenny MacDonald – additional programming
- Mark "Spike" Stent – mixing

== Charts ==
=== Weekly charts ===
Chart (1999)	Peak position
Australia (ARIA)	79
Belgium (Ultratip Bubbling Under Flanders)	4
Canada Adult Contemporary (RPM)	55
Czech Republic (IFPI)	1
Europe (Eurochart Hot 100)	14
France (SNEP)	23
Germany (GfK)	68
Hungary (Mahasz)	6
Iceland (Íslenski Listinn Topp 40)	14
Ireland (IRMA)	14
Italy (Musica e dischi)	42
Italy Airplay (Music & Media)	10
Netherlands (Single Top 100)	72
New Zealand (Recorded Music NZ)	31
Scottish Singles Sales (Official Charts)	1
Spain (Promusicae)	4
Sweden (Sverigetopplistan)	40
Switzerland (Schweizer Hitparade)	33
UK Singles (Official Charts)	4

=== Year-end charts ===
Chart (1999)	Position
Romania (Romanian Top 100)	12
UK Singles (OCC)	100
UK Airplay (Music Week)	9

== Certifications ==
Region	Certification	Certified units/sales
United Kingdom (BPI)	Silver	200,000^{^}
^{^} Shipments figures based on certification alone.

== Release history ==
Region	Date	Format(s)	Label(s)	Ref.
United Kingdom	16 March 1999	Radio	Mercury	
Europe	12 April 1999	CD	Mercury	
United Kingdom	19 April 1999	CD; cassette	Mercury	
United States	20 April 1999	Contemporary hit radio	Universal	
Japan	1 August 1999	CD	Mercury	
