= Mauro Gioia =

Italian singer (born 1966)

Mauro Gioia (born 4 May 1966) is a Neapolitan singer and director.

== Songs ==
His last album was “Rendez-vous Chez Nino Rota”, in which he performed the legendary Milanese composer's duets with Ute Lemper, Catherine Ringer, Sharleen Spiteri, Maria de Medeiros, Adriana Calcanhotto, Martirio, and Susana Rinaldi.

== Documentary ==
While working on the Nino Rota recordings, Gioia made his first documentary, La visita meravigliosa (The Wonderful Visit). The film follows a road trip in which the protagonist—Nino Rota’s nephew—explores the Italian peninsula in an old camper in search of his uncle's friends, and in the process pieces together a personal portrait of the great composer.
