= Rusk, West Virginia =

Rusk
- Unincorporated community
- Location within the state of West Virginia Rusk (the United States)
- Coordinates: 39°9′18″N 80°15′14″W
- Country: United States
- State: West Virginia
- County: Ritchie
- Elevation: 659 ft (201 m)
- Time zone: UTC-5 (Eastern (EST))
  - Summer (DST): UTC-4 (EDT)
- GNIS ID: 1555542

Rusk is an unincorporated community in Ritchie County, West Virginia, United States.

Rusk was laid out circa 1880, and the name taken from the maiden name of a settler's wife.
