= Sharleen Spiteri =

Scottish singer (born 1967)

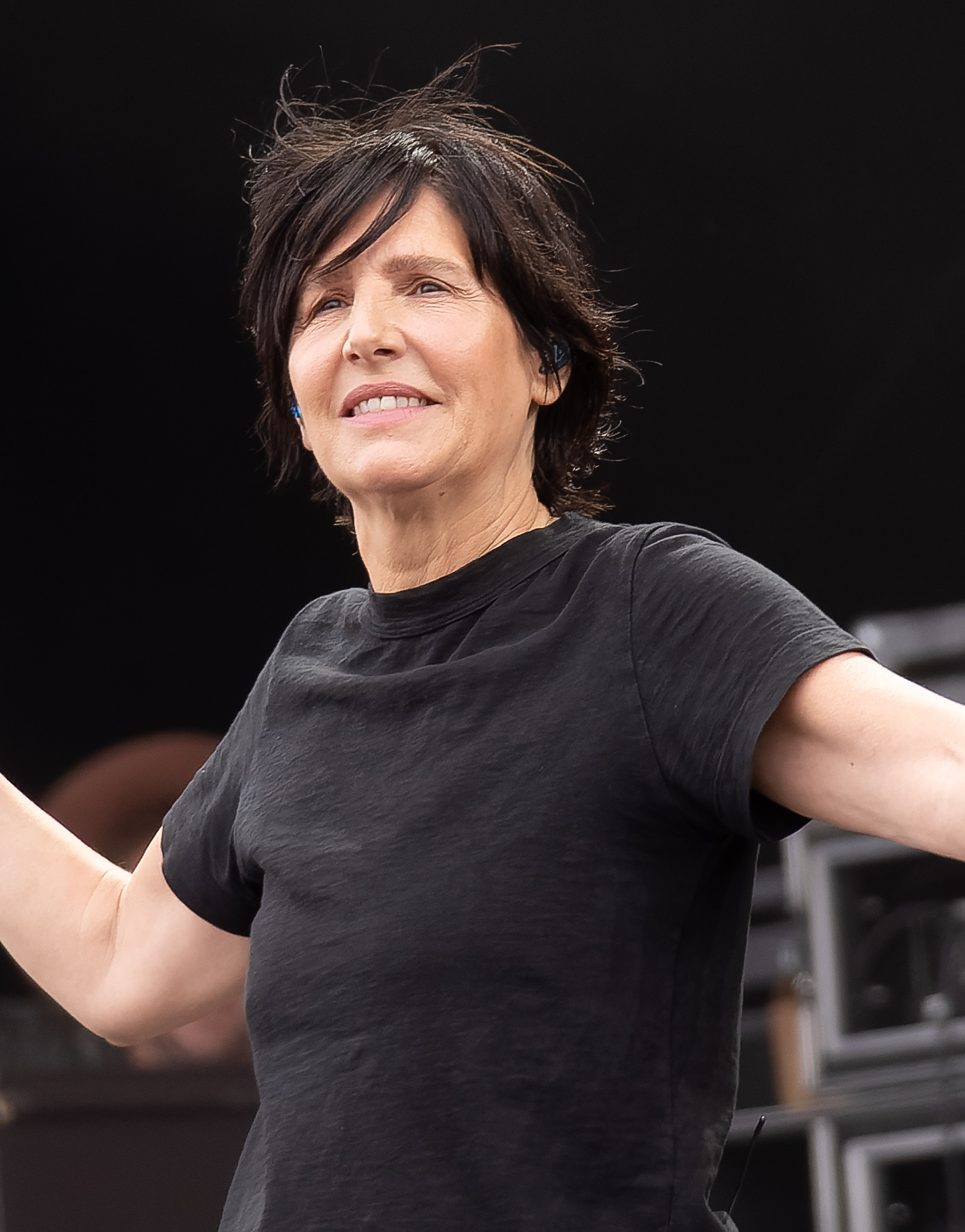
- Spiteri at the Glastonbury Festival, 2023
- Born: Sharleen Eugene Spiteri; 7 November 1967 (age 58); Bellshill, Lanarkshire, Scotland
- Education: University of Glasgow (Honorary Doctorate)
- Occupations: Singer; musician; songwriter
- Years active: 1988–present
- Works: Discography
- Spouse: Bryn Williams (m. 2018)
- Awards: Full list
- Musical career
- Origin: Balloch, Dunbartonshire, Scotland
- Genres: Alternative rock; pop; rock; jazz; soul
- Instruments: Vocals; guitar
- Labels: Mercury, BMG, Pias, Vertigo
- Member of: Texas

Sharleen Eugene Spiteri (born 7 November 1967) is a Scottish singer-songwriter and guitarist who has a contralto vocal range, best known as the lead singer of the rock band Texas, who rose to prominence in 1989 with the release of their debut single "I Don't Want a Lover". Their debut album, Southside (1989) was a commercial success, selling over two million copies. Follow up albums were less successful; however, the release of their fourth album White on Blonde (1997) returned the band to prominence, spawning the internationally successful singles "Say What You Want", "Halo", "Black Eyed Boy" and "Put Your Arms Around Me". Their commercial success continued during the late 1990s and into the early 2000s, with singles "In Our Lifetime", "Summer Son", "In Demand" and "Inner Smile". Following the release of their seventh album Red Book (2005), the band began a hiatus. In 2013, Texas's worldwide album sales were counted at 40 million records.

Texas returned from their hiatus in 2013 with The Conversation, which debuted at No. 4 on the UK Album Chart, No. 3 on their native Scottish Album Charts as well as No. 8 in France. A 25th-anniversary album followed in 2015 entitled Texas 25, followed by the band's ninth studio album, Jump on Board (2017), which achieved mainstream chart success, topping the albums charts in Scotland and debuting within the top ten in France, the United Kingdom and Belgium. Their tenth studio album, Hi was released in May 2021 and became their highest-charting album in the UK since 1999's The Hush, reaching number three on the official UK Albums Chart, number one on the UK Independent Albums Charts and debuting at number one in their native Scotland.

During the period Texas were on hiatus during 2005–2013, Spiteri released her debut solo album Melody which was released in 2008, followed by a second solo album, The Movie Songbook, in March 2010. During this time, Spiteri was a judge on the Sky music talent show, Must Be the Music. In 2022, Spiteri's estimated net worth was $15 million.

== Early life ==
Spiteri was born in Bellshill Maternity Hospital in Bellshill, Scotland, to father Eddie, a guitar-playing merchant seaman, and mother Vilma, a singing window-dresser. Spiteri is of Maltese and Italian descent through her father and of French, Irish and German descent through her mother. When she was young, the family moved from the Glaswegian suburbs to nearby Balloch, close to the shores of Loch Lomond, and she went to Vale of Leven Academy school there.

As a teenager, she was interested in pop culture. Music was her escape: "I used to love going to the record shop on a Saturday and I'd buy a single and a plastic sleeve. I'd go back to my bedroom where [singer] Siouxsie Sioux was painted on my bedroom wall". She later stated: "I guess what people never realise is that real bands and musicians are geeks, we spend our youth as geeks and we turn into these rock stars."

While a student at Vale of Leven Academy, her nickname was 'Spit the Dog', after the character on the TV show Tiswas.

Spiteri worked as a hairdresser in Muirhead, North Lanarkshire, until Texas became her sole priority in 1988.

== Career ==
=== Breakthrough with Texas (1989–1997) ===
Spiteri co-founded the band while working at Irvine and Rita Rusk's salon as a hairdresser in Glasgow. The band, composed of Spiteri, Johnny McElhone, Ally McErlaine, Tony McGovern, Eddie Campbell, Michael Bannister and Neil Payne, first released an EP titled Everyday Now before releasing their debut album Southside in July 1989. The band gained international success with their debut single "I Don't Want a Lover" which reached No. 8 in the UK Singles Chart, and No. 77 on the US Billboard Hot 100. Later singles released from Southside were not as successful, "Thrill Has Gone" which charted at No. 60 on the UK Singles Chart, "Everyday Now" at No. 44 and "Prayer for You" at No. 73. Only four singles were released from Southside before going on a tour and return to the studio to start work on their second album Mothers Heaven. Around the same time as Southside was being recorded, Spiteri's cousin Mark Rankin was founding his own band, the hard rock band Gun, and Spiteri contributed backing vocals to two tracks from their debut album Taking on the World, also released in 1989.

In 1991, Texas's second studio album Mothers Heaven was released, soon after the band released an extended play to help promote the album; Extracts from Mothers Heaven was released in 1991. The album was released on 23 September 1991 and was not as successful as Southside. Their third album, Ricks Road, was released in 1993 and charted at No. 18 on the UK Album Charts. The album's lead single "So Called Friend" charted at No. 30 on the UK Singles Chart and the second "You Owe It All To Me" charted at No. 39. The further three singles released, "So in Love with You" charted at No. 28 in the United Kingdom. The further two singles "You've Got To Give a Little" and "Fade Away" did not chart in the United Kingdom.

=== White on Blonde and increased popularity (1997–2001) ===
In 1997, Texas released "Say What You Want" and became the band's highest-charting single to date on the UK Singles Chart, peaking at No. 3. In February, Texas released their fourth album, White on Blonde, which went on to become the band's most successful album to date. The album charted at No. 1 on the UK Album Charts and returned to the top spot in the United Kingdom three times (including its debut peak at number one). The album managed 91 weeks on the UK Album Charts. After the success of "Say What You Want", Texas released the track "Halo" on 7 April 1997. "Halo" became one of the band's biggest charting UK singles (the band's third UK Top 10 single at that point) charting at No. 10 on the UK Singles Chart. Like "Say What You Want", "Halo" received strong airplay on British radio stations and received fairly positive reviews from music critics. The song stayed on the UK Singles Charts for a total of seven weeks. Texas went on to release a third single from the album; "Black Eyed Boy" was released on 28 July 1997 and became the band's fourth UK top-ten single at the time of its release.

The album's fourth single; "Put Your Arms Around Me" was released on 3 November 1997. In 1999, Texas released their first single from their new fifth studio album. "In Our Lifetime" was released in April 1999 and became the band's second highest-charting single in the United Kingdom, debuting at No. 4 on the UK Singles Chart. With the success of "In Our Lifetime", Texas continued to go ahead with the released of their fifth studio album; The Hush was released in May 1999, and like its predecessor White on Blonde, charted at No. 1 on the UK Album Charts in its first week of release. In 2000, Texas released their first Greatest Hits album on 23 October 2000. The album's lead single "In Demand" was released 2 October 2000.

=== Careful What You Wish For and hiatus (2001–2008) ===
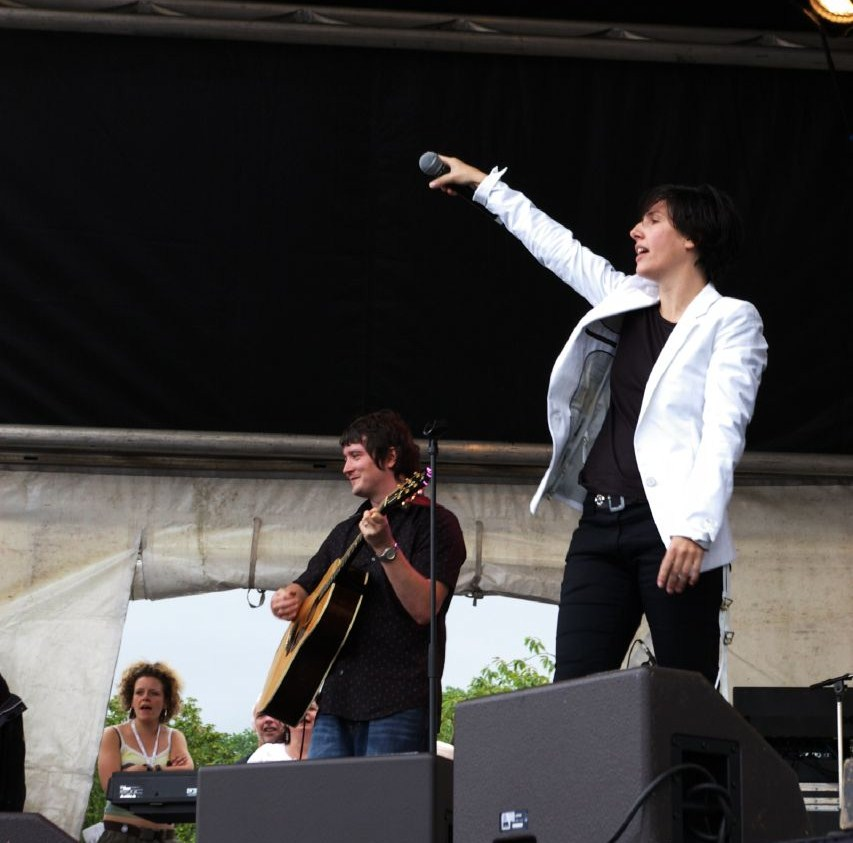
Spiteri and Ally McErlaine performing live with Texas, 2004

In 2001, Spiteri collaborated with American DJ Roger Sanchez on the track "Nothing 2 Prove", which featured on his debut album, First Contact (2001). In September 2002, Spiteri gave birth to her daughter Mysty Kyd, although this did not prevent her from working on another album. On 6 October 2003, Texas released their first single from their upcoming sixth album titled "Carnival Girl", which featured rapping vocals by Canadian artist Kardinal Offishall. On 30 October 2003, Texas released their long-awaited sixth studio album, Careful What You Wish For. The album did not make No. 1 in the United Kingdom like the past three albums (two studio releases and one Greatest Hits) but however, made No. 5 on the UK Album Charts and only managed Gold status awarded by the BPI for sales of over 100,000 copies in the United Kingdom. A second and final single, "I'll See It Through", was released on 8 December 2003. The single became the band's lowest charting single in the UK since "In My Heart" in 1991. The song only managed to make it to No. 40 on the UK Singles Chart and remained in the UK Top 100 for another two weeks.

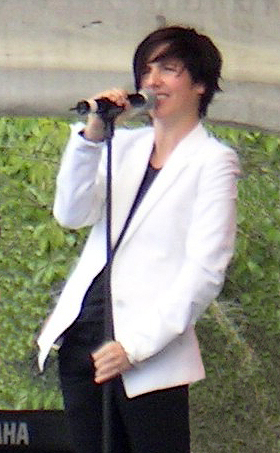
Spiteri performing with Texas in 2006

The band returned in mid-2005 with the single "Getaway", which entered the UK Singles Chart at No. 6, becoming the band's tenth UK top-ten single. "Can't Resist" was released as the second single on 31 October 2005. The band's seventh studio album, Red Book, followed on 7 November 2005 and reached No. 16 in the UK albums chart. The band's third and final single "Sleep" from the album was released on 9 January 2006. The song was the band's eleventh UK Top 10 single, peaking at No. 6 on the UK Singles Chart as well as making No. 37 on the Irish Singles Charts. The song featured vocals from Paul Buchannan from the Scottish band, the Blue Nile. On 21 February 2006, a promo-only single, "What About Us", was released. On 24 September 2007 the band released The BBC Sessions, including radio sessions spanning from 1989 to 2005, with extensive liner notes and interviews with Spiteri. Cover songs include Elmore James's "It Hurts Me Too", the Beatles' "I've Got a Feeling", and Ashford & Simpson's "You're All I Need to Get By."

On 11 September 2009, Ally McErlaine was hospitalised after he collapsed with a massive brain aneurysm at age 41. As of February 2010, he is on the road to recovery, as reported by Spiteri in The Sunday Mail: "Ally is the most stubborn person I have ever come across, and I think his sheer pigheadedness is the reason he's still here. When he asked what was happening with Texas, I said it was up to him. He told me he wanted to get back into the studio."

=== Solo career and Melody (2008–2013) ===
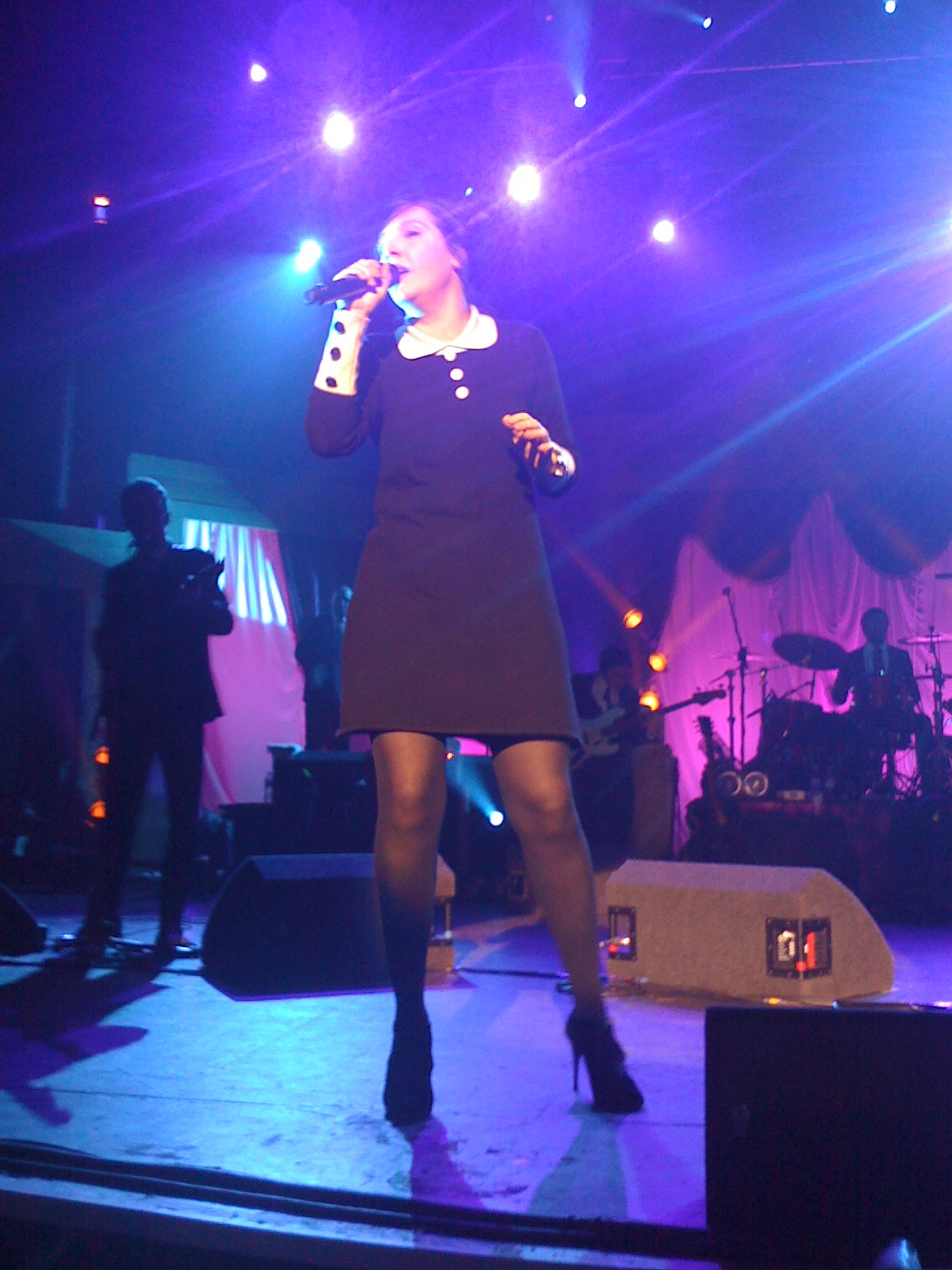
Spiteri performing during her solo tour in support of Melody, 2009

After Texas released Red Book in 2005, the band members confirmed that they would enter a hiatus. Spiteri performed as guest vocalist on Rammstein's Rosenrot album. She began work on her debut solo album, working with some of her former bandmates. She wrote the vast majority of the tracks on the album. She released her debut solo album Melody on 14 July 2008 with "All The Times I Cried" serving as the album's lead single. The song charted at No. 26 on the UK Singles Chart. Melody was proven popular in the United Kingdom, debuting at a high No. 3 on the UK Album Charts. In other European countries where Texas were popular like in Belgium, the album charted at No. 15 on the Belgium Flanders Charts and No. 13 on the Belgium Wallonia Charts. The song "Don't Keep Me Waiting" was released as a single in Switzerland only, in which it charted at No. 78 on the singles charts there. A further two singles were released worldwide, "Stop, I Don't Love You Anymore" and "It Was You" which were both unpopular in the United Kingdom, missing the UK top 100, with "Stop, I Don't Love You Anymore" charting at No. 107 and "It Was You" at No. 178. By 2009, Melody has been certified Gold by the BPI (UK) with sales of over 100,000.

Spiteri released her second solo studio album The Movie Songbook which consists of film covers chosen by Spiteri herself was released on 1 March 2010. The album's lead single "Xanadu" was released in February 2010, and charted at No. 71 on the UK Singles Chart in March 2010. As for the album, it charted at No. 13 on the UK Album Charts on 7 March 2010, thus becoming Spiteri's second UK top-40 album as a soloist, and her seventh UK top-40 album both as a soloist and a member of Texas. To promote the album, she performed in front of 55,000 fans supporting Paul McCartney on his Up and Coming Tour at Hampden Park in Glasgow.

In 2010, Spiteri appeared as a judge on the Sky 1 reality show Must Be the Music.

=== Texas reunion and resurgence (2013–present) ===
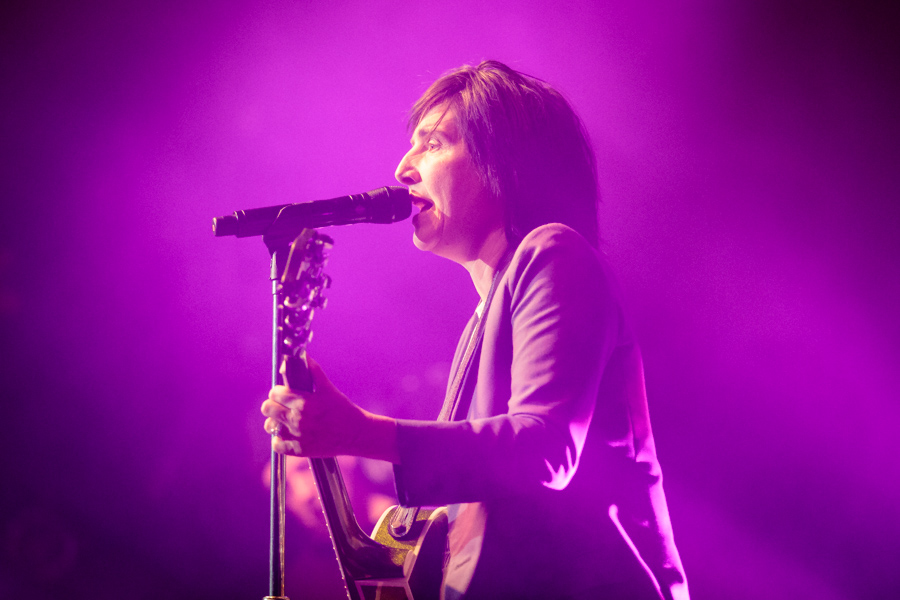
Spiteri with Texas live on stage at Rockefeller Music Hall, 2018

In February 2013, Music Week announced the band had signed a new record deal with PIAS Recordings and were to release their first new album since reuniting. The Conversation was released on 20 May 2013. Physical formats included a single disc and double-disc deluxe edition. The latter featured a bonus disc entitled Live in Scotland. Also in 2013, a UK tour was announced and the album launched at two gigs, one at King Tut's Wah Wah Hut in Glasgow and the other at the 100 Club in London. To celebrate the band's 25th anniversary, it was announced that some of their biggest hits would be re-recorded for a new album entitled Texas 25. The collection features eight songs from the band's back catalogue completely reworked with the help of New York production team Truth & Soul, as well as four brand new songs, and was released on 16 February 2015. Deluxe packages include a second disc of the hits in their original form. The lead single, "Start a Family", premiered online on 6 January 2015. The band embarked on a UK tour throughout April and May 2015.

The band released their ninth studio album, Jump on Board in May 2017 to critical acclaim, with "Let's Work it Out" serving as the lead single from the new album. Jump on Board performed well commercially in the band's native Scotland, debuting at number one on the Scottish Albums Chart. The album reached number one in France and performed well in the UK chart. In support of the album, the band embarked on the Jump on Board Live Tour world tour.

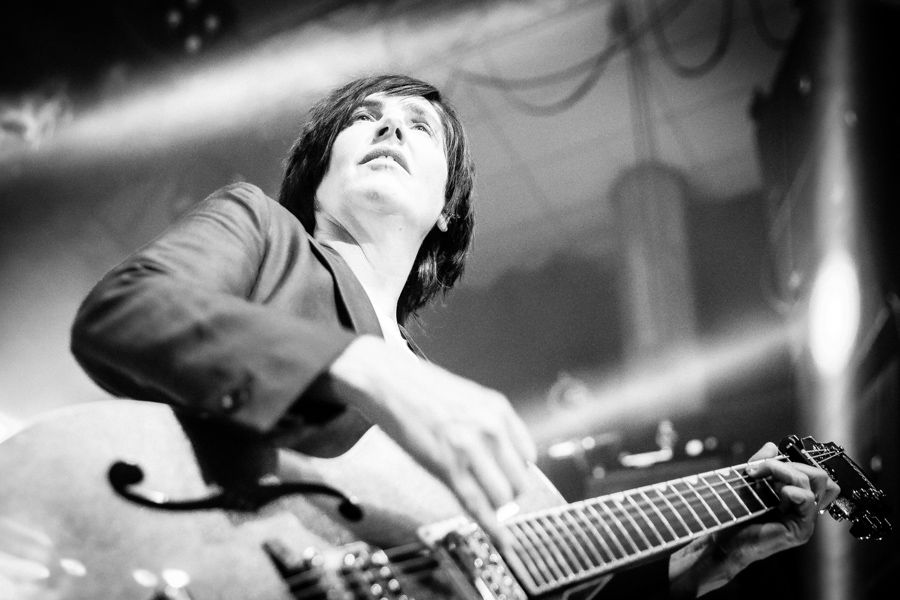
Spiteri performing live, 2018

On 28 February 2020, the band announced on Twitter that its next album was called Hi, which was released on BMG on 28 May 2021. A single, also called "Hi", was released in December 2020 and reunited the band with the Wu-Tang Clan after 22 years. A video was released for the song with Small Axe actor Kadeem Ramsay, a promo video that also includes footage of Texas, RZA and Method Man performing "Say What You Want" at the BRIT Awards in 1998. In April 2021, the second single from Hi was released. Called "Mr Haze", the track sampled the melody from "Love's Unkind" (a Giorgio Moroder production which was a Top 10 hit for Donna Summer in the late 1970s) and was performed on The One Show on BBC One. Hi is the tenth album released by Texas and includes collaborations with Richard Hawley and Altered Images' Clare Grogan, the latter duetting with Spiteri on the song "Look What You've Done".

In 2023, Texas released another career-spanning greatest hits collection, The Very Best of 1989–2023, was released on 16 June 2023. On 8 June 2023 Texas recorded a video documentary in association with ARTE at the Chateau d'Herouville. On 23 June 2023, the band played the Pyramid Stage at Glastonbury Festival, UK.

== Artistry ==
Spiteri's musical influences include the Clash (the main reason she plays a black Fender Telecaster), Blondie, Marvin Gaye and Prince. She is also a dedicated Diana Ross fan. Spiteri has a large lesbian fanbase, although she is heterosexual. Since emerging as lead singer of Texas, she has since become known for her jet black, short hair, as well as her "strong contralto vocal range".

== Filmography ==
Spiteri landed the part of a detective opposite Edward Furlong in the thriller 3 Blind Mice, but backed out due to pregnancy. She was also cast in Moulin Rouge! starring Nicole Kidman and Ewan McGregor, but she told Jonathan Ross on his show on 4 November 2005 that she declined because she did not want to move to Australia for a year. In 2011, she appeared in the French version of The X Factor with Henri Padovani who was managing groups for the competition. In 2016, she appeared on the British programme Top Gear, along with Seasick Steve and Tinie Tempah in a South African SUV challenge.

== Personal life ==
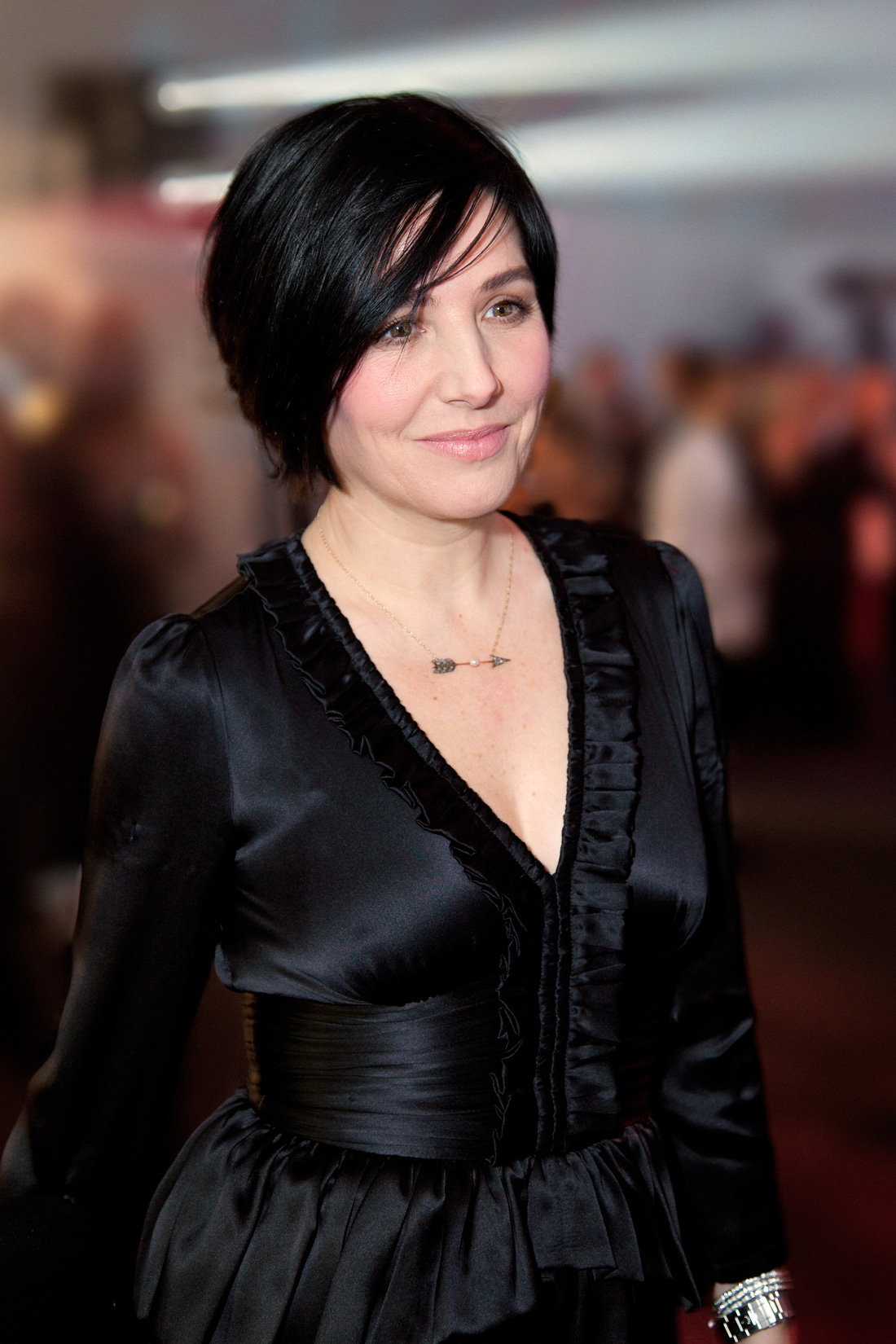
Spiteri in 2011

Spiteri had a long-term relationship with the editor of Arena magazine, Ashley Heath. The couple has a daughter, Misty Kyd (named after Misty, referenced in the Clint Eastwood film Play Misty for Me, and Wild West outlaw Billy the Kid), born on 9 September 2002. The birth prompted her close friend Thierry Henry to dedicate a goal to her daughter by revealing the slogan "For the new born Kyd" beneath his shirt later that day. The couple separated in 2005.

Spiteri married celebrity chef Bryn Williams in September 2018 at the 15th-century church of St. Tyrnog in Llandyrnog, North Wales. She wore a dress designed by her friend Stella McCartney. Despite being married to a chef, Spiteri does the cooking in their home, as she revealed on the Fuelling Around podcast in 2021.

At Hogmanay on 31 December 2022, she joined Dame Judi Dench in an impromptu performance of Abba's "Waterloo" at the Fife Arms hotel in Braemar, where they were both staying.

=== Political views ===
In the run-up to the 2014 Scottish independence referendum, Spiteri expressed support for Scotland remaining in the Union, stating "As far as I'm concerned, I'm British. And, yeah, I'm Scottish but I feel I'm part of the UK." In September 2021, Texas announced that Spiteri and all her bandmates now supported Scottish independence after Brexit.

=== Other interests ===
In September 2021, Spiteri appeared on BBC's RHS Chelsea Flower Show to showcase her garden in North Wales in which she grows produce for use in her husband's restaurant.

She is a patron of children's cancer charity Young Lives vs Cancer (formerly known as CLIC Sargent. She is also a supporter of Arsenal and is a season-ticket holder at the Emirates Stadium.

Spiteri is a car enthusiast.

== Discography ==
=== As solo artist ===
- Melody (2008)
- The Movie Songbook (2010)

=== with Texas ===
- Southside (1989)
- Mothers Heaven (1991)
- Ricks Road (1993)
- White on Blonde (1997)
- The Hush (1999)
- Careful What You Wish For (2003)
- Red Book (2005)
- The Conversation (2013)
- Texas 25 (2015)
- Jump on Board (2017)
- Hi (2021)
