= Stop, I Don't Love You Anymore =

Single by Sharleen Spiteri

from the album Melody
- Released: (United Kingdom) 6 October 2008
- Recorded: London, U.K.
- Genre: Soul
- Length: 3:06
- Label: Mercury, Universal Music
- Songwriter(s): Sharleen Spiteri/Johnny McElhone
- Producer(s): Sharleen Spiteri

Sharleen Spiteri singles chronology
"All the Times I Cried" (2008)	"Stop, I Don't Love You Anymore" (2008)	"It Was You" (2008)

"Stop I Don't Love You Anymore" is the second single from Sharleen Spiteri's first solo album Melody. It was slated for release on 29 September 2008 but for unknown reasons this was pushed back to 6 October 2008 as a digital download only single. The song failed to chart in the top 100 UK singles, peaking only at number 107.

== Background ==
Speaking in August 2008 to noted UK soul/R&B writer Pete Lewis of the award-winning 'Blues & Soul', Spiteri explained how the song and track first came about: "It was funny, because my daughter inspired me to write that title! She loves music, and we were upstairs singing away when she suddenly started going 'Stop, baby - I don't love you!'! And I was like 'That's IT! Stop, I don't love you anymore!'! You know, as a five-year-old she said in such a simple way exactly what I'd been trying to get across, but hadn't quite managed to come up with. And for the track's actual production, I was inspired by how - with a band like The Supremes - they'd have that big, vast orchestration and then put those beautiful, sweet vocals on top of it."

== Music video ==
The music video premiered on Spiteri's YouTube channel on 1 September 2008.

It begins with the title of the single appearing on a TV, then you see that a woman is watching the TV, as the camera pulls close to the TV Spiteri is seen singing. While she is singing, clips of couples are shown. While singing the word Stop, the word also goes across the screen followed by the words I Don't Love You Anymore. This repeats itself through the end of the video.
