= It Was You =

Single by Sharleen Spiteri

from the album Melody
- Released: (United Kingdom) 1 December 2008
- Recorded: 2008
- Label: Mercury, Universal Music
- Songwriter: Bernard Butler/Johnny McElhone/Sharleen Spiteri
- Producer: Sharleen Spiteri

Sharleen Spiteri singles chronology
"Stop, I Don't Love You Anymore" (2008)	"It Was You" (2008)	"Xanadu" (2010)

"It Was You" is the third single released off Sharleen Spiteri's first solo album Melody. It was originally rumoured to be the second single due to it being on the albums sticker but it turned out to be "Stop, I Don't Love You Anymore", it was later announced to be the third single on Sharleen Spiteri's official website, it was released as digital download on 1 December 2008, following the single "Stop, I Don't Love You Anymore".

== Commercial performance ==
Digital Spy commented on It Was You, saying "having threatened to give Paris Hilton a "Glaswegian kiss" earlier this year, it's clear that Sharleen Spiteri is no shrinking violet. Rather than falling back on the tried-and-tested Texas sound, she went all sixties on her debut solo album and, as its third single shows, it certainly paid off. "It Was You" sees Spiteri team up with producer Bernard Butler – the man responsible for much of Duffy's Rockferry album. With its soulful vocals, tooting trumpets and punchy chorus, this could almost have been a contender for the recent Bond theme. Spiteri, meanwhile, adopts the same no-nonsense approach she took with the world's most famous heiress, singing, "Something inside just died - it was you". To Spiteri's ex, it's the lyrical equivalent of a Glaswegian kiss.

== Live performance ==
Sharleen Spiteri has uploaded a live acoustic version of "It Was You" onto YouTube on 28 September 2008; it has currently been viewed 4,724 times. On 17 May 2008 a version of her performing it on Later With Jools Holland appeared, this version has been viewed 36,254 times.

== Chart performance ==
Chart	Peak position
UK Singles Charts	178
