= Ally McErlaine =

Scottish guitarist

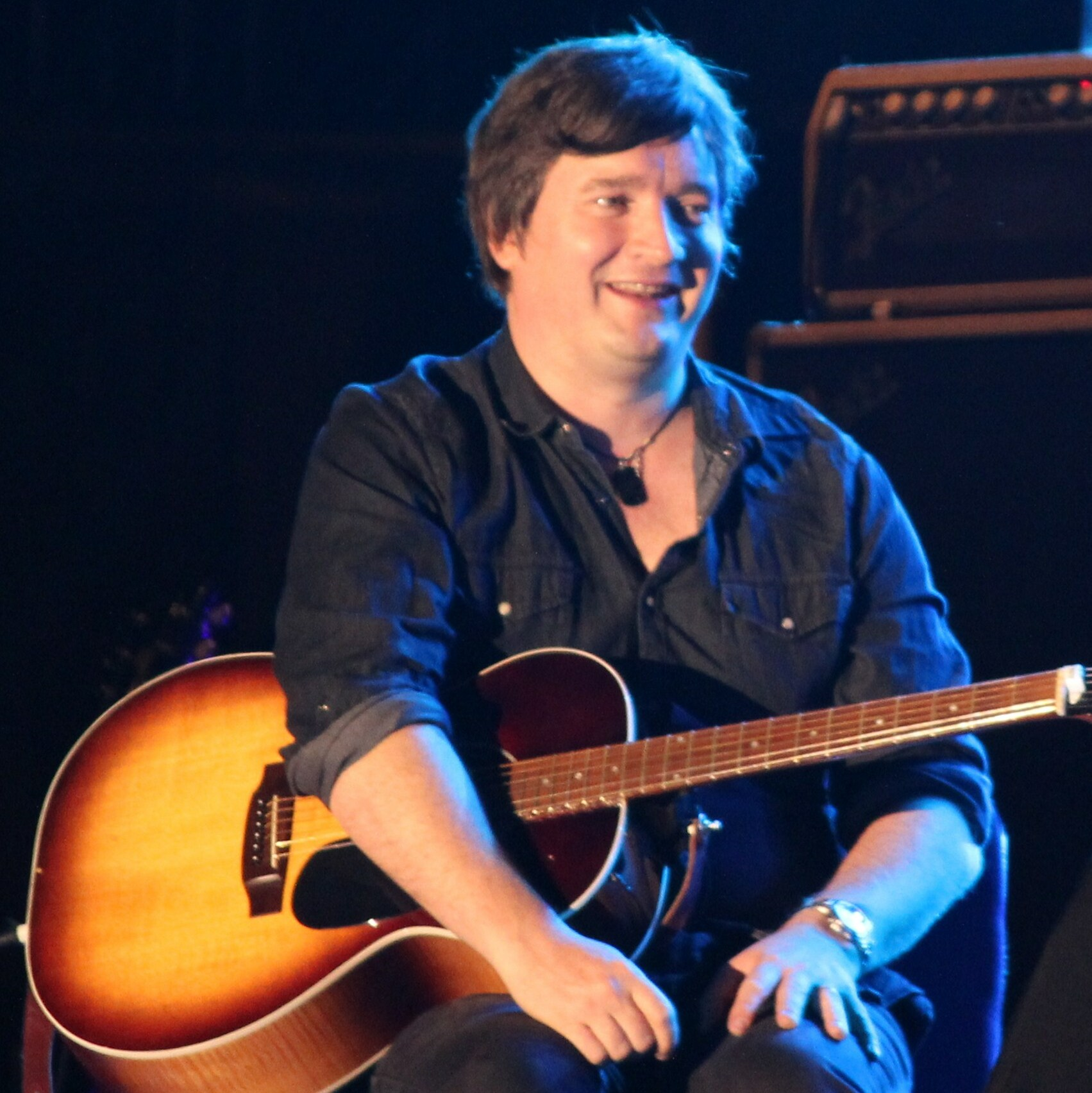
- McErlaine performing live with Texas in 2011

Background information
- Born: Alistair Manson McErlaine; 31 October 1968 (age 57); Glasgow, Scotland
- Genres: Alternative rock; country rock; pop; rock
- Occupation: Guitarist
- Years active: 1988−present
- Member of: Texas; Red Sky July
- Spouse: Shelly Poole (m. 2001)

Alistair Manson McErlaine (born 31 October 1968), known as Ally McErlaine, is a Scottish guitarist, best known for his work with the band Texas, of which he was a member from 1988 to 2022. He is a member of Red Sky July, who released their self-titled debut album on 17 October 2011.

== Biography ==
Other works aside from Texas, included a guest appearance on Rufus Wainwright's second album, Poses (2001), and Alain Bashung's 1994 album Chatterton. He was also the lead guitarist on the soundtrack album for the 2004 remake of the film, Alfie, along with Mick Jagger and David A. Stewart. He wrote and played guitar on two songs on Daisy Dares You's album, Rush on Jive Records.

McErlaine also wrote and played on the song "Hope", with Jack Savoretti and his wife Shelly Poole from her album, Hard Time for the Dreamer. It was released on Transistor Records in June 2005. It received airplay on BBC Radio 2 in November 2005. He played guitar on Gabrielle's fifth album, Always. In 2009, he started the alternative country band, Red Sky July, with his wife and American singer Charity Hair.

== Musical career ==
=== Texas ===
McErlaine, Sharleen Spiteri and Johnny McElhone are credited as the founding members of Texas.

=== Red Sky July ===
McErlaine is also a member of the band Red Sky July, who released their self-titled debut album on 17 October 2011.

== Personal life ==
McErlaine married Shelly Poole from Alisha's Attic in 2001. On 8 September 2009, McErlaine was admitted to hospital after he collapsed with a massive brain aneurysm at the age of 41. His chances of recovery were initially unclear. McErlaine was in a coma for nine weeks, and spent six and a half months in hospital, before being discharged to continue to recover at home. By July 2010, McErlaine had recovered enough to perform on stage in several shows with Red Sky July, and had a chance to join Texas for their tour in 2011.

== Discography ==
- Southside (1989)
- Mothers Heaven (1991)
- Ricks Road (1993)
- White on Blonde (1997)
- The Hush (1999)
- Careful What You Wish For (2003)
- Red Book (2005)
- The Conversation (2013)
- Jump on Board (2017)
- Hi (2021)
