= Xanadu (Olivia Newton-John and Electric Light Orchestra song) =

1980 single

- One of the UK releases, with pink vinyl

Single by Olivia Newton-John and Electric Light Orchestra

from the album Xanadu
- B-side: "Whenever You're Away from Me" (with Gene Kelly) (US); "Fool Country" (UK)
- Released: 13 June 1980
- Recorded: 1979
- Studio: Musicland Studios (Munich)
- Genre: Disco; pop
- Length: 3:28
- Label: MCA (US); Jet (UK)
- Songwriter: Jeff Lynne
- Producer: Jeff Lynne

Electric Light Orchestra singles chronology
"I'm Alive" (1980)	"Xanadu" (1980)	"All Over the World" (1980)

Olivia Newton-John singles chronology
"Magic" (1980)	"Xanadu" (1980)	"Suddenly" (1980)

Audio video
- "Xanadu" on YouTube

"Xanadu" is the title song from the soundtrack of the 1980 musical film of the same name. Written by Jeff Lynne of the English rock band Electric Light Orchestra (ELO), the song is performed by British-Australian singer, songwriter and actress Olivia Newton-John, with ELO providing the instrumentation and backing vocals. It was Lynne's favourite of his own songs. Released as a single in June 1980, the song reached number one in several different European countries and was the band's only UK number-one single when it peaked there for two weeks in July 1980. It was certified silver by the British Phonographic Industry. It also peaked at #8 on the US Billboard Hot 100.

== Background ==
Sung by Newton-John as the film's main female character Kira, it peaked at number one in Austria, Belgium, Ireland, the Netherlands, Norway, Spain, the United Kingdom and West Germany.

== Reception ==
Professional ratings
Review scores
Source	Rating
Billboard	(favourable)

Billboard′s reviewer described the song as a "sizzling track", writing: "Essentially it's Olivia taking Jeff Lynne's usual spot as lead singer of ELO. The combination is a winning one".

== Personnel ==
- Olivia Newton-John – lead and backing vocals
- Jeff Lynne – guitars, keyboards, backing vocals
- Bev Bevan – drums, percussion
- Richard Tandy – keyboards
- Kelly Groucutt – bass guitar, backing vocals
- James Newton Howard – synthesizers
- Louis Clark – strings

== Charts ==
=== Weekly charts ===
Chart (1980–1981)	Peak position
Australia (Kent Music Report)	2
Austria (Ö3 Austria Top 40)	1
Belgium (Ultratop 50 Flanders)	1
Canada Top Singles (RPM)	9
Canada Adult Contemporary (RPM)	2
Europe (European Hot 100 Singles)	1
Finland (Suomen virallinen lista)	4
France (SNEP)	3
Ireland (IRMA)	1
Israel (Israeli Singles Chart)	1
Japan (Oricon)	18
Netherlands (Dutch Top 40)	1
Netherlands (Single Top 100)	1
New Zealand (Recorded Music NZ)	8
Norway (VG-lista)	1
South Africa (Springbok)	20
Spain (AFE)	1
Sweden (Sverigetopplistan)	3
Switzerland (Schweizer Hitparade)	2
UK Singles (OCC)	1
US Billboard Hot 100	8
US Adult Contemporary (Billboard)	2
US Cash Box Top 100	9
US Record World Singles	4
US Radio & Records (R&R)	2
West Germany (GfK)	1
Zimbabwe (ZIMA)	1
Quebec (ADISQ)	1

Chart (2022)	Peak position
Japan Hot Overseas (Billboard Japan)	18
U.S. Digital Song Sales (Billboard)	40
UK Singles Downloads (Official Charts)	21

=== Year-end charts ===
Chart (1980)	Rank
Australia (Kent Music Report)	53
Canada Top Singles (RPM)	71
Spain (AFE)	9
UK Singles (OCC)	34
US American Top 40	93
US Opus	26

== Olivia featuring Paula version ==
"Xanadu"

Single by Olivia featuring Paula
- Released: 4 December 1995
- Recorded: 1995
- Genre: Dance
- Label: MDS
- Songwriter: Jeff Lynne

In late 1995, two Australian dance performers released two versions of the song. Sydney singer Olivia featuring Paula (on the MDS label) released a dance version first, followed by Kirsty K. (on Central Station Records). Both versions charted on the ARIA Singles and Dance Charts in the first half of 1996.

=== Charts ===
Chart (1996)	Peak position
Australia (ARIA)	55

== Kirsty K. version ==
"Xanadu"

Single by Kirsty K.
- Released: December 1995
- Recorded: 1995
- Genre: Dance
- Length: 3:30
- Label: Central Station
- Songwriter: Jeff Lynne

=== Charts ===
Chart (1996)	Peak position
Australia (ARIA)	71

== New Electric Light Orchestra version ==
In 2000, ELO's Jeff Lynne re-recorded the song, with his own vocals, for the box set Flashback and the All Over the World compilation. Though it was billed as an ELO selection, the song was recorded by Lynne with Marc Mann on keyboards, but without input from his former bandmates Richard Tandy, Bev Bevan and Kelly Groucutt.

== Sharleen Spiteri version ==
"Xanadu"

Single by Sharleen Spiteri

from the album The Movie Songbook
- Released: 25 February 2010
- Recorded: 2009
- Genre: Pop
- Length: 3:34
- Label: Mercury; Universal
- Songwriter: Jeff Lynne
- Producer: Sharleen Spiteri

Sharleen Spiteri singles chronology
"It Was You" (2008)	"Xanadu" (2010)

In 2009, Scottish singer-songwriter Sharleen Spiteri recorded the song for her second studio album titled The Movie Songbook which was released on 1 March 2010 worldwide. "Xanadu" was released as the lead single from the album in February 2010.

=== Charts ===
Chart (2010)	Peak position
UK Singles (OCC)	71
