= In Demand (song) =

2000 single by Texas

Single by Texas

from the album The Greatest Hits
- B-side: "Early Hours"; "Like Lovers (Holding On)"
- Released: 25 September 2000
- Length: 4:26
- Label: Mercury
- Songwriters: Dallas Austin; Johnny McElhone; Sharleen Spiteri
- Producer: Dallas Austin

Texas singles chronology
"When We Are Together" (1999)	"In Demand" (2000)	"Inner Smile" (2001)

"In Demand" is a song by Scottish band Texas, written by Dallas Austin with band members Johnny McElhone and Sharleen Spiteri. The song was released in Europe on 25 September 2000 and in the United Kingdom on 2 October 2000 as the first single from their compilation album The Greatest Hits, reaching number six on the UK Singles Chart and number 10 in Spain.

== Music video ==
The single was accompanied by a music video, which stars English actor Alan Rickman alongside Sharleen Spiteri. In it, Spiteri is seen wrapped up in a parka jacket being driven through the night in the back of a chauffeured Bentley Azure. A suited Rickman strokes and comforts her while helicopters and motorbikes photograph them. When the car pulls in for petrol, Rickman pulls off Spiteri's parka jacket to reveal an evening dress underneath and they dance a tango together on the station forecourt. The petrol forecourt scene was filmed at the Shell petrol station in Bordon, Hampshire.

In the early morning, the car drives them into the seaside town Brighton and parks up outside a run-down apartment block called Embassy Court on the Kings Road where Rickman hauls a shabby backpack out of the boot and enters the building, Spiteri is driven away by her chauffeur.

== Track listings ==
UK CD1

1. "In Demand"
2. "Early Hours"
3. "Like Lovers (Holding On)"
4. "In Demand" (video)

UK and European CD2

1. "In Demand" (US mix)
2. "In Demand" (Sunship remix)
3. "In Demand" (Wookie remix)
4. "In Demand" (Sunship dub)

UK 12-inch single

A. "In Demand" (Wookie remix)
B. "In Demand" (Sunship dub)

UK cassette single

A. "In Demand"
B. "In Demand" (Sunship remix)

European and Australasian maxi-CD single

1. "In Demand"
2. "Like Lovers (Holding On)"
3. "In Demand" (Sunship remix)
4. "In Demand" (Wookie remix)
5. "In Demand" (video)

== Personnel ==
Personnel are lifted from The Greatest Hits album booklet.

- Dallas Austin – writing, keyboards, production
- Johnny McElhone – writing, keyboards, programming
- Sharleen Spiteri – writing, backing vocals, programming
- Debra Killings – backing vocals
- Tomi Martin – guitars
- Eddie Campbell – keyboards, programming
- Tom Knight – drums
- Kenny Macdonald – additional drums
- Rick Sheppard – programming
- Mark "Spike" Stent – mixing

== Charts ==
=== Weekly charts ===
Chart (2000)	Peak position
Australia (ARIA)	183
Belgium (Ultratip Bubbling Under Flanders)	2
Belgium (Ultratip Bubbling Under Wallonia)	5
Europe (Eurochart Hot 100)	25
Germany (GfK)	80
Netherlands (Single Top 100)	89
Romania (Romanian Top 100)	7
Scotland Singles (OCC)	2
Spain (Promusicae)	10
Switzerland (Schweizer Hitparade)	49
UK Singles (OCC)	6

=== Year-end charts ===
Chart (2000)	Position
Romania (Romanian Top 100)	75
UK Singles (OCC)	169

== Release history ==
Region	Date	Format(s)	Label(s)	Ref.
Europe	25 September 2000	CD	Mercury	
United Kingdom	2 October 2000	CD; cassette	Mercury	
United Kingdom	6 November 2000	12-inch vinyl	Mercury	
