= Rusk (hair care) =

Brand of hair care products

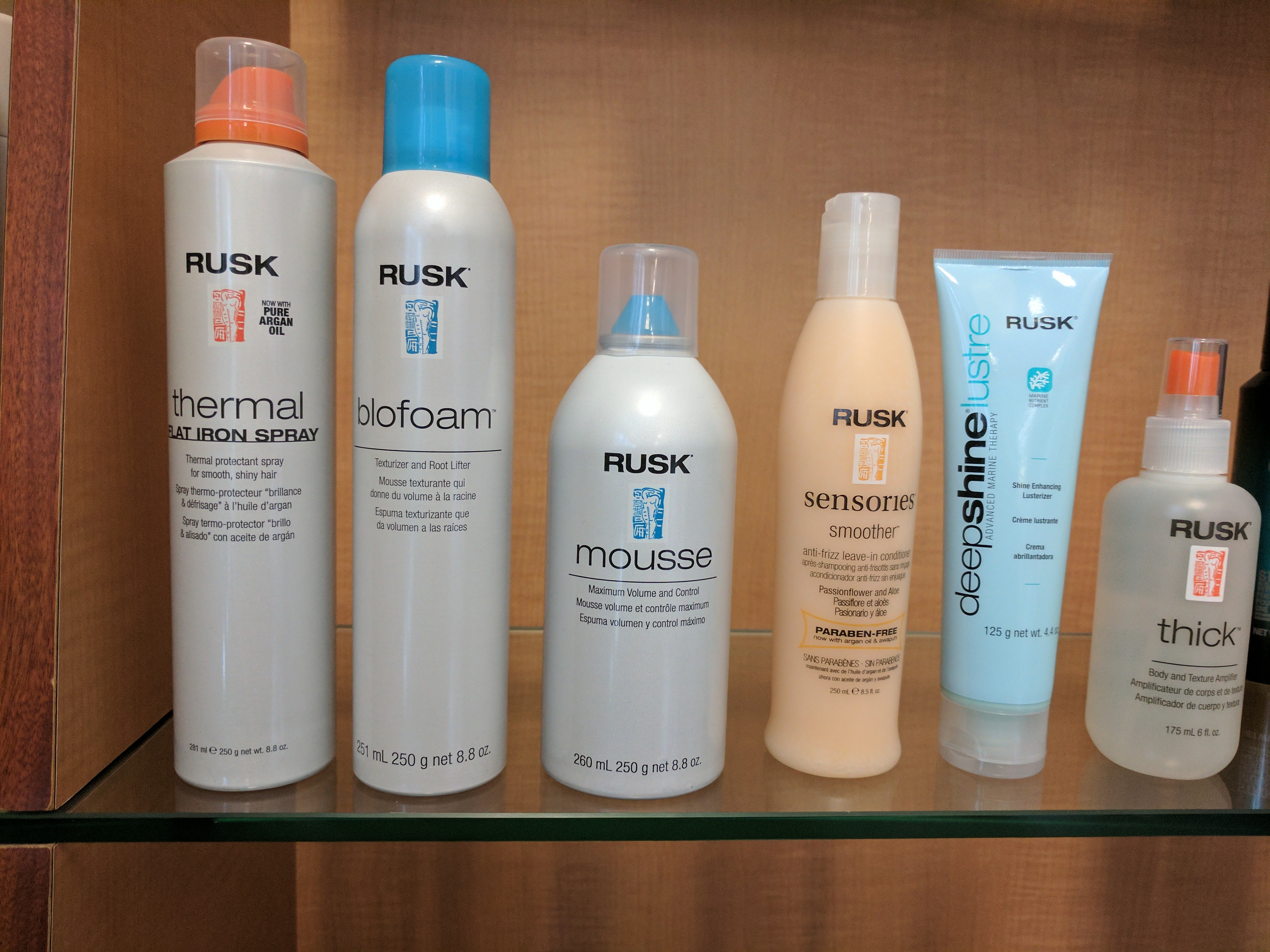
An assortment of Rusk-brand hair and beauty products on a store shelf.

Rusk is a brand of hair care products and devices designed for hair salons. The brands products are sold in several markets of the world most notably in North America and Europe.

It was founded by the couple, Irvine and Louise Rusk. Irvine, who was from Scotland, moved to the United States and met Louise Rodgers, an accomplished hairdresser. They married in 1993 and "soon started a family together and worked tirelessly to build their line of hair care products aptly named RUSK."

Rusk was purchased in 2003 by the multinational company, Conair Corporation.

Rusk is managed by Beauty Quest Group, with Offices in Stamford CT. CEO David Rosenblatt
