= Johnny McElhone =

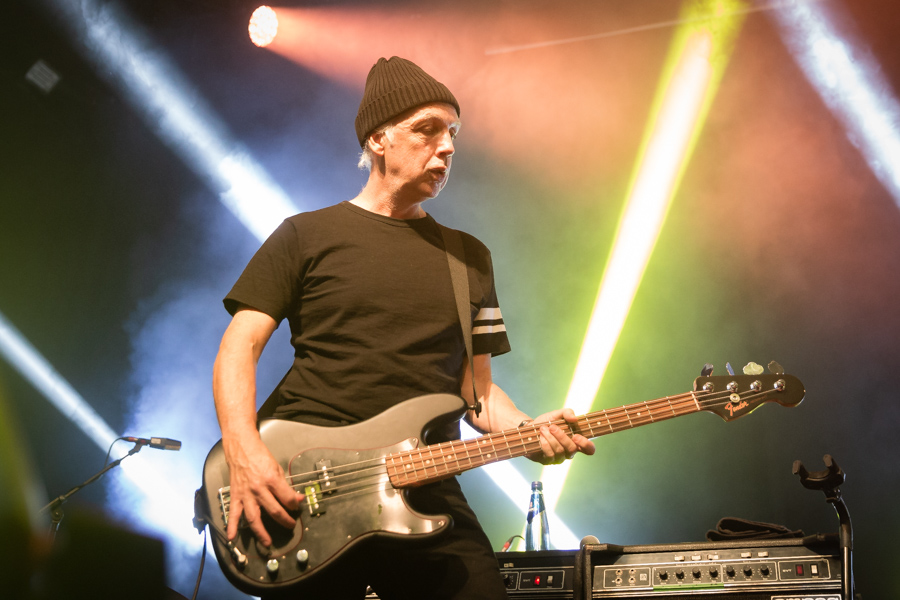
- McElhone performing in Oslo, Norway, 2018

Background information
- Born: John Francis McElhone; 21 April 1963 (age 63); Glasgow, Scotland
- Origin: Scotland
- Occupations: Musician; songwriter

John Francis McElhone (born 21 April 1963) is a Scottish guitarist and songwriter from Glasgow.

He played with three bands who have enjoyed a top-20 presence on the UK Singles Chart; the new wave bands Altered Images and Hipsway, and the alternative/pop rock band Texas. Both Altered Images and Texas have had top 20 albums on the UK Albums Chart.

He is one of four children of Scottish Labour MPs Frank and Helen McElhone. He is the father of child actor Jack McElhone, who co-starred with Gerard Butler and Emily Mortimer in the 2004 film Dear Frankie.
