= Texas discography =

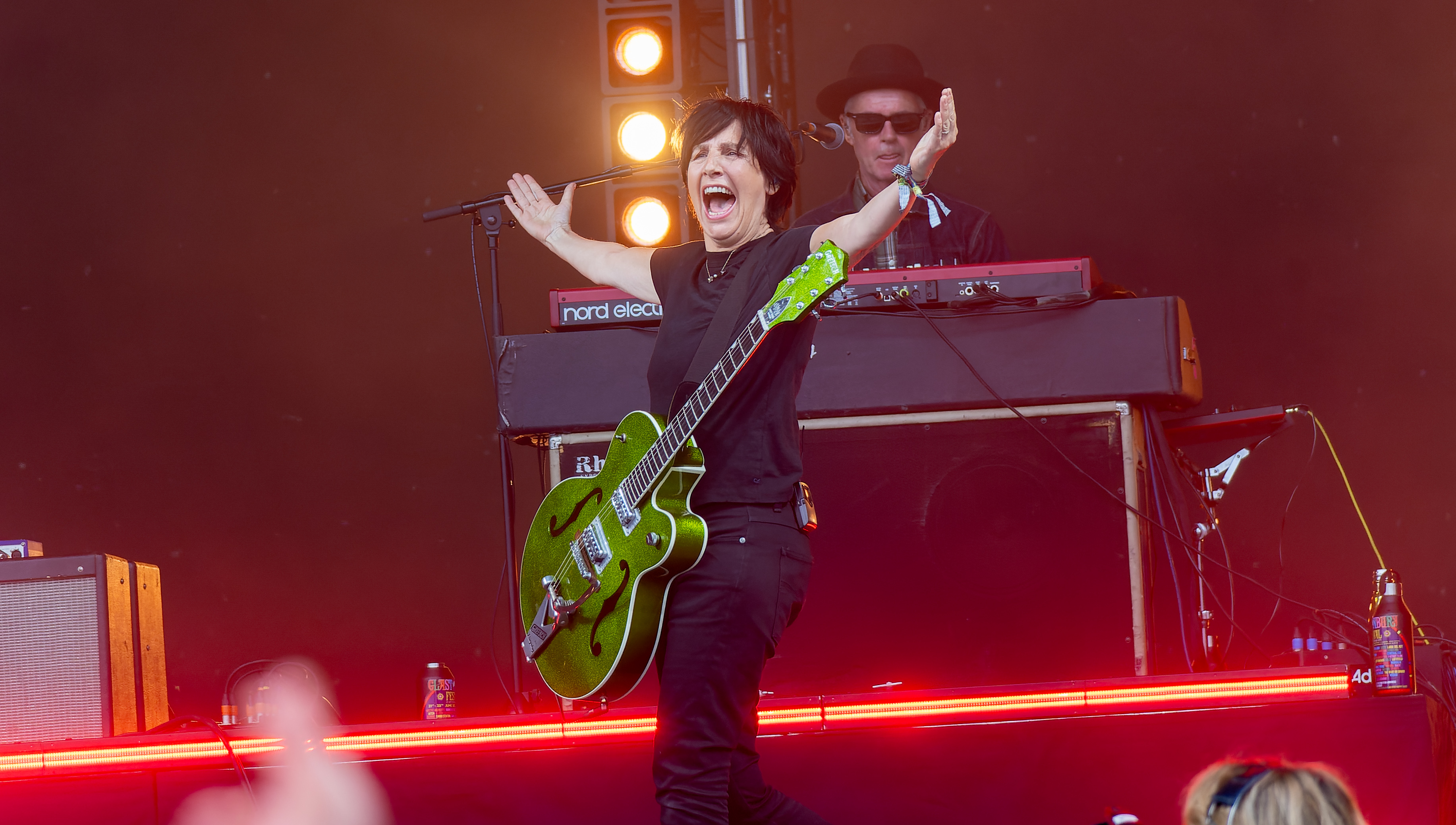
- Texas performing at the Glastonbury Festival, 2023
- Studio albums: 10
- Extended plays: 1
- Live albums: 1
- Compilation albums: 5
- Singles: 46
- Video albums: 1
- Music videos: 45

The discography of Scottish pop rock band Texas contains 10 studio albums, one live album, five compilation albums and 46 singles. Their most successful single to date is "Say What You Want" (1997), which peaked at number three on the UK Singles Chart. Texas made their performing debut in March 1988 at Scotland's University of Dundee. They took their name from the 1984 Wim Wenders movie Paris, Texas. The band released their debut album Southside, in 1989, along with the debut single "I Don't Want a Lover", which was a worldwide success, charting at number eight on the UK Singles Chart and other high charting positions in Europe. Southside debuted at number three in the United Kingdom and number 88 on the US Billboard 200 album chart. Despite the success of Southside, follow-up albums Mothers Heaven and Ricks Road were less successful in the UK.

Texas' White on Blonde album was one of the best selling albums of 1997. To date, it has been certified six-fold platinum in the UK, making it the band's best selling UK album. Their only other album to reach a six-fold platinum certification was 2000's The Greatest Hits. Follow up The Hush was also successful, debuting at number one on the UK album charts and being certified triple platinum. Texas released a further two studio albums, Careful What You Wish For in 2003, and Red Book in 2005, both of which were certified gold in the UK. After the release of Red Book and a tour to support the album's release, Texas entered a self-imposed hiatus. Lead singer Sharleen Spiteri launched a successful solo career, releasing her debut solo album Melody in 2008.

The band returned from their hiatus in 2013, releasing the album The Conversation which reached the top ten in Scotland, the United Kingdom, Belgium, Switzerland and France. The lead single of the same name saw Texas return to the UK Singles Charts for the first time since "Sleep" in 2006. The Conversation was certified Platinum in France, indicating sales in excess of 130,000 copies, and achieved Gold certification in the United Kingdom. A compilation album, Texas 25 was released in 2015, and featured the single "Start a Family", which featured guest vocals by actor Alan Rickman. Their ninth studio album, Jump on Board, was released in 2017 and spawned the singles "Let's Work It Out" and "Tell That Girl" which were commercial hits in Belgium. Their tenth studio album, Hi was released in 2021, and saw the band collaborate once again with the Wu-Tang Clan, previously having done so in 1998 with "Say What You Want (All Day, Every Day)". The second single, "Mr Haze", was a moderate success in Belgium. A compilation album, The Very Best of 1989–2023 was released in June 2023, reaching number one in Scotland, and the top ten in the United Kingdom, Belgium and France.

== Albums ==
=== Studio albums ===
List of albums, with selected chart positions, and certifications
Title	Album details	Peak chart positions										Certifications
Title	Album details	UK	AUS	AUT	FRA	GER	NLD	NZ	NOR	SWE	SWI	Certifications
Southside	Released: 13 March 1989; Label: Mercury, Vertigo; Formats: CD, LP, cassette	3	14	—	3	22	25	12	—	14	1	BPI: Gold; ARIA: Platinum; IFPI SWI: Platinum; NVPI: Gold; SNEP: Platinum
Mothers Heaven	Released: 23 September 1991; Label: Mercury, Vertigo; Formats: CD, LP, cassette	32	74	—	11	39	37	40	—	35	17	IFPI SWI: Gold; SNEP: 2× Gold
Ricks Road	Released: 1 November 1993; Label: Mercury, Vertigo; Formats: CD, LP, cassette	18	96	—	4	—	84	—	—	50	14	BPI: Silver; SNEP: 2× Gold
White on Blonde	Released: 3 February 1997; Label: Mercury; Formats: CD, LP, cassette	1	25	32	2	44	21	36	17	12	25	BPI: 6× Platinum; GLF: Gold; IFPI SWI: Platinum; SNEP: Platinum
The Hush	Released: 10 May 1999; Label: Mercury; Formats: CD, cassette	1	75	11	2	7	29	42	7	7	5	BPI: 3× Platinum; BVMI: Gold; GLF: Gold; IFPI NOR: Gold; IFPI SWI: Platinum; SNEP: 2× Platinum
Careful What You Wish For	Released: 20 October 2003; Label: Mercury; Formats: CD, cassette	5	—	46	5	25	88	—	35	28	6	BPI: Gold; IFPI SWI: Gold
Red Book	Released: 7 November 2005; Label: Mercury; Formats: CD, digital download	16	—	—	9	43	99	—	—	60	10	BPI: Gold
The Conversation	Released: 20 May 2013; Label: PIAS; Formats: CD, LP, digital download	4	—	—	8	38	46	—	27	51	7	BPI: Gold; SNEP: Platinum
Jump on Board	Released: 21 April 2017; Label: BMG; Formats: CD, LP, cassette, digital download	6	—	—	3	63	—	—	—	—	12	SNEP: Gold
Hi	Released: 28 May 2021; Label: BMG; Formats: CD, LP, digital download	3	—	—	10	32	—	—	—	—	5	
"—" denotes album that did not chart or was not released

=== Compilation albums ===
Title	Album details	Peak chart positions										Certifications
Title	Album details	UK	AUS	AUT	FRA	GER	NLD	NZ	NOR	SWE	SWI	Certifications
The Greatest Hits	Released: 23 October 2000; Label: Mercury; Formats: CD, cassette	1	144 (Note: The Greatest Hits was released as Song Book in Australia)	7	1	11	16	40	5	8	6	BPI: 6× Platinum; IFPI SWI: 2× Platinum; NVPI: Gold
I Don't Want a Lover: The Collection	Released: 21 September 2004; Label: Spectrum; Formats: CD, digital download	—	—	—	—	—	—	—	—	—	—	
Say What You Want: The Collection	Released: 2012; Label: Spectrum; Formats: CD, digital download	—	—	—	—	—	—	—	—	—	—	BPI: Silver
Texas 25	Released: 16 February 2015; Label: PIAS; Formats: CD, LP, digital download	5	—	—	7	—	72	—	—	—	32	BPI: Silver
The Very Best of 1989–2023	Released: 16 June 2023; Label: PIAS; Formats: CD, LP, digital download	6	—	—	8	74	—	—	—	—	—	BPI: Silver
"—" denotes album that did not chart or was not released.

=== Live albums ===
Title	Album details
The BBC Sessions	Released: 27 August 2007; Label: Universal; Formats: CD, digital download

=== Collaborative albums ===
List of collaborative albums, with selected chart positions
Title	Album details	Peak chart positions		
Title	Album details	BEL (FL)	BEL (WA)	FRA
The Muscle Shoals Sessions (with Spooner Oldham)	Released: 29 March 2024; Label: PIAS Le Label; Formats: CD, LP, digital download	69	95	19

== Extended plays ==
Title	Details
Everyday Now	Released: 14 June 1989; Label: Mercury; Formats: CD, EP, cassette

== Singles ==
Year	Single	Peak chart positions										Certifications	Album
Year	Single	UK	AUS	FRA	GER	IRE	NLD	NZ	SPA	SWE	SWI	Certifications	Album
1989	"I Don't Want a Lover"	8	4	11	18	8	50	11	20	—	3	BPI: Silver; ARIA: Gold	Southside
1989	"Thrill Has Gone"	60	60	—	73	—	—	19	—	—	—		Southside
1989	"Everyday Now"	44	52	25	—	—	—	—	—	—	—		Southside
1989	"Prayer for You"	73	101	—	—	—	31	—	—	—	—		Southside
1991	"Why Believe in You"	66	73	—	—	—	44	—	—	—	—		Mothers Heaven
1991	"In My Heart"	74	92	44	—	—	—	32	—	—	—		Mothers Heaven
1992	"Alone with You"	32	—	28	—	—	—	—	—	—	—		Mothers Heaven
1992	"Mothers Heaven"	—	—	—	—	—	—	—	—	—	—		Mothers Heaven
1992	"Tired of Being Alone"	19	173	—	—	—	—	—	—	—	—		—N/a
1993	"So Called Friend"	30	—	—	92	—	—	—	—	—	—		Ricks Road
1993	"You Owe It All to Me"	39	118	—	—	—	—	—	—	—	—		Ricks Road
1994	"So in Love with You"	28	—	50	—	—	—	—	—	—	—		Ricks Road
1994	"Fade Away"	—	172	—	—	—	—	—	—	—	—		Ricks Road
1997	"Say What You Want"	3	11	22	61	14	35	—	3	29	27	BPI: Platinum; RMNZ: Platinum; SPA: Gold	White on Blonde
1997	"Halo"	10	163	—	—	—	—	—	—	—	—		White on Blonde
1997	"Black Eyed Boy"	5	50	29	68	23	56	—	—	45	—		White on Blonde
1997	"Put Your Arms Around Me"	10	166	67	—	—	—	—	—	—	—		White on Blonde
1998	"Insane"	4	—	—	—	25	6	3	—	—	39		White on Blonde
1998	"Say What You Want (All Day, Every Day)" (featuring the Wu-Tang Clan)	4	—	—	—	25	6	3	—	—	39		—N/a
1999	"In Our Lifetime"	4	79	23	68	14	72	31	4	40	33	BPI: Silver	The Hush
1999	"Summer Son"	5	95	4	3	18	63	—	8	31	3	BPI: Silver; BVMI: Gold	The Hush
1999	"When We Are Together"	12	—	—	71	—	89	—	—	—	—		The Hush
2000	"In Demand"	6	183	—	80	20	89	—	10	—	49		The Greatest Hits
2001	"Inner Smile"	6	93	37	36	17	27	—	8	26	27	BPI: Gold	The Greatest Hits
2001	"I Don't Want a Lover" (2001 mix)	16	—	—	—	29	—	—	—	—	—		The Greatest Hits
2001	"Guitar Song"	—	—	—	—	—	—	—	—	—	—		The Greatest Hits
2003	"Carnival Girl" (featuring Kardinal Offishall)	9	—	57	94	43	—	—	14	—	41		Careful What You Wish For
2003	"I'll See It Through"	40	—	—	—	—	—	—	—	—	—		Careful What You Wish For
2005	"Getaway"	6	—	59	59	34	97	—	—	41	45		Red Book
2005	"Can't Resist"	13	—	—	—	—	—	—	—	—	—		Red Book
2006	"Sleep"	6	—	—	—	37	—	—	—	—	—		Red Book
2013	"The Conversation"	73	—	22	—	—	—	—	—	—	15		The Conversation
2013	"Detroit City"	161	—	—	—	—	—	—	—	—	—		The Conversation
2013	"Dry Your Eyes"	—	—	—	—	—	—	—	—	—	—		The Conversation
2015	"Start a Family"	—	—	151	—	—	—	—	—	—	—		Texas 25
2017	"Let's Work It Out"	—	—	—	—	—	—	—	—	—	—		Jump on Board
2017	"Tell That Girl"	—	—	—	—	—	—	—	—	—	—		Jump on Board
2017	"Midnight"	—	—	—	—	—	—	—	—	—	—		Jump on Board
2017	"Can't Control"	—	—	—	—	—	—	—	—	—	—		Jump on Board
2020	"Hi" (featuring the Wu-Tang Clan)	—	—	—	—	—	—	—	—	—	—		Hi
2021	"Mr Haze"	— (Note: "Mr Haxe" did not enter the UK Singles Top 100 but instead debuted and peaked at number 21 on the UK Singles Downloads Chart Top 100 on 13 May 2021.)	—	—	—	—	—	—	—	—	—		Hi
2021	"Moonstar"	—	—	—	—	—	—	—	—	—	—		Hi
2021	"You Can Call Me"	—	—	—	—	—	—	—	—	—	—		Hi
2021	"Unbelievable"	—	—	—	—	—	—	—	—	—	—		Hi
2023	"After All"	— (Note: "After All" did not enter the UK Singles Top 100 but instead debuted and peaked at number 54 on the UK Singles Downloads Chart Top 100 on 23 June 2023.)	—	—	—	—	—	—	—	—	—		The Very Best of 1989–2023
2023	"Keep on Talking"	—	—	—	—	—	—	—	—	—	—		The Very Best of 1989–2023
2026	"Another Way To Cry"	—	—	—	—	—	—	—	—	—	—		
"—" denotes single that did not chart or was not released

=== As featured artist ===
- "Until the Next Time" (Moonlight Matters featuring Texas) (2017)

== Other contributions ==
Year	Song	Album
1995	"I Shall Be Released" (Stephan Eicher and Texas)	Duos Taratata
1997	"I Can't Get Next to You" (Live)	Live & Loud
1998	"You'll Never Know"	The Acid House: Music from the Motion Picture
1998	"Parisian Pierrot"	Twentieth-Century Blues: The Songs of Noël Coward
2000	"Like Lovers (Holding On)"	Titan A.E. – Music from the Motion Picture
2007	"What Do I Get?"	Change Your Tune
2014	"Don't Talk to Me About Love"	Sounds of the 80s: Unique Covers of Classic Hits
2023	"Nous, on veut vivre nous (I want it all)"	Planete Terre

== Videos ==
=== Video albums ===
Title	Video details	Certifications	Notes
Texas Paris	Released: 2001; Label: Mercury; Formats: DVD	BPI: Gold	Concert recorded live at the Palais Omnisports de Paris-Bercy in Paris; Music videos; Interview with Sharleen Spiteri; Bonus acoustic performance recorded at the Brixton Academy

=== Music videos ===
Year	Title	Director(s)
1989	"I Don't Want a Lover"	Tom Bird
1989	"Thrill Has Gone"	Tony Van Den Ende
1989	"Everyday Now"	Stéphane Clavier
1989	"Prayer for You"	Tony Van Den Ende
1991	"Why Believe in You"	Dani Jacobs
1991	"In My Heart"	
1992	"Alone with You"	Dani Jacobs
1992	"Mothers Heaven"	
1992	"Tired of Being Alone"	Joe Jones, Damien Smith
1993	"So Called Friend"	
1993	"You Owe It All to Me"	Dani Jacobs
1994	"So in Love with You"	Matt Mahum
1994	"Fade Away"	
1997	"Say What You Want"	David Mould
1997	"Halo"	David Mould
1997	"Say What You Want (US version)"	Peggy Sirota
1997	"Black Eyed Boy"	Karen Lamond
1997	"Put Your Arms Around Me"	Karen Lamond
1998	"Say What You Want (All Day, Every Day)" (featuring the Wu-Tang Clan)	Diane Martel
1999	"In Our Lifetime"	Philippe André
1999	"Summer Son"	Stéphane Sednaoui
1999	"When We Are Together"	Doug Nichol
2000	"In Demand"	Vaughan Arnell
2001	"Inner Smile"	Vaughan Arnell
2001	"I Don't Want a Lover" (2001 mix)	Dick Caruthers
2003	"Carnival Girl" (featuring Kardinal Offishall)	Jonas Åkerlund
2003	"I'll See It Through"	Vaughan Arnell
2005	"Getaway"	Tim Royes
2005	"Can't Resist"	Sam Brown
2006	"Sleep"	Peter Kay
2013	"The Conversation"	
2013	"Detroit City"	
2013	"Dry Your Eyes"	
2015	"Start a Family"	Julian Broad
2017	"Let's Work It Out"	Matthew Button
2017	"Tell That Girl"	
2017	"Midnight"	
2017	"Can't Control"	Charles Mehling
2020	"Hi"	Fenn O'Meally
2021	"Mr Haze"	Simone Smith
2021	"You Can Call Me"	Angelica Bjornsson
2021	"Unbelievable"	Sean Ellis
2023	"After All"	Lewis Knaggs
2023	"Keep On Talking"	Bailey Tom Bailey
2026	"Another Way To Cry"	Niall Trask
