= The Very Best of 1989–2023 =

Compilation album by Texas
- Released: 16 June 2023
- Recorded: 1988–2023
- Length: 93:48
- Label: PIAS

Texas chronology
Hi (2021)	The Very Best of 1989–2023 (2023)

The Very Best of 1989–2023 is a compilation album by Scottish rock band Texas, released on 16 June 2023 through PIAS Recordings. It includes two new recordings, "After All" and "Keep on Talking". The album debuted at number six on the UK Albums Chart.

== Critical reception ==
Professional ratings
Review scores
Source	Rating
Retropop	4/5 stars

Retropop called the album a "carefully curated set" that does not include all of Texas's major hits but rather makes it "less a commercial exercise and more a finely pieced-together collection of vignettes from throughout the years". The publication also felt that the two new songs "sit seamlessly alongside the group's back catalogue and prove that, decades into their career, Texas remain in fine form" and "only the limited tracklist [...] slightly lets down this superb celebration of the band's work to date".

== Track listing ==
The Very Best of 1989–2023 track listing
No.	Title	Writer(s)	Original album	Length
1.	"Say What You Want"	Johnny McElhone; Sharleen Spiteri	White on Blonde (1997)	3:54
2.	"Black Eyed Boy" (radio edit)	McElhone; Spiteri; Robert Hodgens; Eddie Campbell; Richard Hynd	White on Blonde	3:12
3.	"Inner Smile"	McElhone; Spiteri; Gregg Alexander; Rick Nowels	The Greatest Hits (2000)	3:52
4.	"Mr Haze"	McElhone; Spiteri; Hodgens; Jack McElhone; Giorgio Moroder; Pete Bellotte; Donna Summer	Hi (2021)	3:40
5.	"Halo"	McElhone; Spiteri	White on Blonde	4:11
6.	"I Don't Want a Lover"	McElhone; Spiteri	Southside (1989)	5:04
7.	"Summer Son"	McElhone; Spiteri; Campbell; Hodgens	The Hush (1999)	4:05
8.	"Keep on Talking"	Dan Penn; Spooner Oldham	New recording	3:07
9.	"The Conversation"	McElhone; Spiteri; Karen Overton; Amanda Ghost; Ian Dench	The Conversation (2013)	2:45
10.	"In Our Lifetime"	McElhone; Spiteri	The Hush	4:08
11.	"In Demand"	McElhone; Spiteri; Dallas Austin	The Greatest Hits	4:27
12.	"Put Your Arms Around Me"	McElhone; Spiteri; Dave Stewart; Hodgens	White on Blonde	4:35
13.	"Let's Work It Out"	McElhone; Spiteri; Jack McElhone; Angelica Bjornsson	Jump on Board (2017)	3:44
14.	"When We Are Together"	McElhone; Spiteri	The Hush	3:32
15.	"Hi" (single mix)	McElhone; Spiteri; Campbell; Hodgens; Jack McElhone	Hi	2:51
16.	"Say What You Want (All Day, Every Day)" (featuring the Wu-Tang Clan)	McElhone; Spiteri	Non-album single (1998)	4:40
17.	"Tired of Being Alone"	Al Green	Ricks Road (1993)	3:17
18.	"Start a Family" (featuring Alan Rickman)	McElhone; Spiteri; Overton; Jack McElhone	Texas 25 (2015)	3:34
19.	"So Called Friend"	McElhone; Spiteri	Ricks Road (1993)	3:43
20.	"Everyday Now"	McElhone; Spiteri	Southside	4:36
21.	"Insane"	McElhone; Spiteri	White on Blonde	4:46
22.	"After All"	McElhone; Spiteri; Jack McElhone; Angelica Bjornsson	New recording	3:12
23.	"Let me Sleep" (featuring Paul Buchanan)	McElhone; Spiteri	Red Book (2005)	4:08
24.	"So in Love with You"	McElhone; Spiteri	Ricks Road	4:45

== Charts ==
Chart performance for The Very Best of 1989–2023
Chart (2023)	Peak position
Belgian Albums (Ultratop Flanders)	16
Belgian Albums (Ultratop Wallonia)	4
French Albums (SNEP)	8
German Albums (Offizielle Top 100)	74
Scottish Albums (OCC)	1
Spanish Albums (Promusicae)	100
Swiss Albums (Schweizer Hitparade)	66
UK Albums (OCC)	6
UK Independent Albums (OCC)	3

== Certifications ==
Certifications for The Very Best of 1989–2023
Region	Certification	Certified units/sales
United Kingdom (BPI)	Silver	60,000^{‡}
^{‡} Sales+streaming figures based on certification alone.
