= I Don't Want a Lover: The Collection =

Compilation album by Texas
- Released: 21 September 2004
- Recorded: 1989–1996
- Genre: Rock
- Length: 55:45
- Label: Spectrum Music; 9817823
- Producer: Tim Palmer, Paul Fox, Texas

Texas chronology
| Careful What You Wish For (2003) | I Don't Want a Lover: The Collection (2004) | Red Book (2005) |

Professional ratings
Review scores
| Source | Rating |
|---|---|
| AllMusic | 3.5/5 stars |

I Don't Want a Lover: The Collection is a compilation album by Texas, released by Spectrum Music (a budget subsidiary of Universal Music Group) in 2004. It comprises album tracks and singles from their debut album Southside through to 1997's White on Blonde.

An eight-page booklet contains an overview essay by Michael Heatley.

== Track listing ==
1. "I Don't Want a Lover" – 5:02
2. "Why Believe in You" – 4:08
3. "Say What You Want" – 3:52
4. "This Will All Be Mine" – 2:58
5. "So Called Friend" – 3:46
6. "I've Been Missing You" – 3:18
7. "Prayer for You" – 4:47
8. "Fight the Feeling" – 3:37
9. "Breathless" – 3:54
10. "Ticket to Lie" – 3:32
11. "Dream Hotel" – 4:22
12. "Hear Me Now" – 4:15
13. "One Choice" – 4:07
14. "Postcard" – 4:05
