= Alone with You (Texas song) =

1992 single by Texas

Single by Texas

from the album Mothers Heaven
- B-side: "Down in Battlefield"
- Released: 27 January 1992
- Length: 4:44
- Label: Mercury
- Songwriters: Johnny McElhone; Sharleen Spiteri
- Producer: Tim Palmer

Texas singles chronology
"In My Heart" (1991)	"Alone with You" (1992)	"Mothers Heaven" (1992)

"Alone with You" is a song by Scottish band Texas, released in January 1991 by Mercury Records as the third single from their second album, Mothers Heaven (1991). It is written by Johnny McElhone and Sharleen Spiteri and produced by Tim Palmer. The song returned the band to the UK Singles Chart top 40 for the first time since 1989, reaching number 32. It also reached number 28 in France, where it was released in late 1991.

== Track listings ==
- UK 7-inch and cassette single
1. "Alone with You"
2. "Down in Battlefield"
- UK CD1
1. "Alone with You"
2. "Why Believe in You"
3. "Everyday Now"
4. "I Don't Want a Lover"
- UK CD2
1. "Alone with You"
2. "Can't Get Next to You" (Norman Whitfield, Barrett Strong)
3. "What Goes On" (Lou Reed)
4. "Sweet Child o' Mine" (Steven Adler, Duff McKagan, Izzy Stradlin, Axl Rose, Slash)

Note: "Can't Get Next to You" and "What Goes On" were recorded live at Antoines, Austin, Texas, on 23 November 1991. "Sweet Child o' Mine" was recorded live at Wembley Stadium on 26 August 1989.

== Charts ==
Chart (1991)	Peak position
France (SNEP)	28
UK Singles (OCC)	32
UK Airplay (Music Week)	37
