= Hi (Texas album) =

Studio album by Texas
- Released: 28 May 2021
- Recorded: 2020–2021
- Studios: Various locations in Scotland, Wales and the United States
- Genre: Pop/Rock
- Length: 38:44
- Label: BMG
- Producers: Johnny McElhone; Texas

Texas chronology
Jump on Board (2017)	Hi (2021)	The Very Best of 1989–2023 (2023)

Singles from Hi
- 1. "Hi" Released: 1 December 2020; 2. "Mr Haze" Released: 6 April 2021; 3. "Moonstar" Released: 3 May 2021; 4. "You Can Call Me" Released: 10 September 2021; 5. "Unbelievable" Released: 19 November 2021

Hi is the tenth studio album by the Scottish alternative rock band Texas, released on 28 May 2021 through BMG. The album was intended to be a release which would include "lost" outtakes from the recording sessions of their 1997 album White on Blonde, but this was eventually shelved and ultimately led the band to create new material. The album spawned two moderately commercial singles – the title track and "Mr Haze", and was supported by a further three singles – "Moonstar", "You Can Call Me" and "Unbelievable".

The album was a commercial success for the band, peaking at number one on the albums charts in their native Scotland, as well as the independent albums charts in the United Kingdom. Additionally, it reached the top ten in Belgium, France and Switzerland, and became the 184th best selling album of the year in France.

== Background and recording ==
During promotion for the album, lead singer Sharleen Spiteri stated: "Our excitement at finding this treasure trove of songs collided with our excitement back then and, unplanned, new songs started coming, you could say we were inspired by ourselves!" Other songs on the album include "Dark Fire", written with Richard Hawley, and "Look What You've Done", a duet between Spiteri and Clare Grogan of Altered Images. The record also features the ballad "Unbelievable". Speaking about the recording of the track, Spiteri said: "We don't usually do ballads, but this one really stuck. The words are very intimate and personal while the music sounds really epic."

Several sonic elements are evident on Hi, including the "vintage R&B" track "Just Want to Be Liked", the country-inspired "Moonstar", "brawny guitar pop" on "Sound of My Voice" and "Italo-western decadence with a spicy hip-hop twist" on "Hi". "Mr. Haze" is a Motown-inspired track that samples and draws inspiration from Donna Summer's 1977 song "Love's Unkind". The release and recording of Hi sees the band collaborate again with artists that have previously collaborated with the band, including singer-actress Clare Grogan on "Look What You've Done" and the Wu-Tang Clan's RZA and Ghostface Killah on "Hi". Grogan's previously worked with McElhone when they shared time recording together during McElhone's time in the band Altered Images from 1979 to 1983.

Previously, Texas had collaborated with the Wu-Tang Clan, Method Man and RZA in 1997 on the "All Day Every Day" remix of their gold-selling White on Blonde single "Say What You Want", as well as performing the track at the 1998 BRIT Awards.

== Promotion and touring ==
To promote the release of the album, Spiteri appeared on various chat shows, including Saturday Morning with James Martin. The band announced a 27-date UK and Ireland tour across February and March 2022, commencing with two shows at Dublin's Olympia on 10 and 11 February and concluding at Stoke-On-Trent's Victoria Hall on 20 March.

== Critical reception ==
Professional ratings
Aggregate scores
Source	Rating
Metacritic	74/100
Review scores
Source	Rating
AllMusic	3.5/5 stars
Clash	7/10
Classic Rock	4/5 stars
i	3/5 stars
Uncut	7/10

Kate Solomon of i wrote that "Hi suggests a casual greeting, a meeting between two friends who may have drifted apart, and that is what the album feels like: falling into an easy routine with an old friend. The band built it on the foundations of old songs that hadn't made it on to White on Blonde, trading lines and themes with their selves of 24 years ago".

Camryn Teder from the website Mxdwn called Hi "a funky, sultry '70s pop-inspired epic. With influences from soft-rock '80s guitar riffs and layered chord progressions over heartbroken lyrics, the result is a peek into a love of the past and Texas's influences in the industry. [...] Texas gradually and effortlessly introduces a multitude of genres in their new album Hi. With a relentless fearlessness toward sound creation and an unwillingness to drop in quality, Texas has provided another 14 gems to their hundreds-strong song collection."

== Commercial performance ==
In the United Kingdom, Hi became the highest charting album for the band since The Hush in 1999, debuting at number one on the UK Independent Albums Chart and number three on the official UK Albums Chart. It spent a combined total of twenty-six weeks within the top 100 of the UK Independent Albums Charts, whilst it spent only three weeks within the top 100 of the main albums charts in the United Kingdom. In their native Scotland, like their previous album Jump on Board, Hi reached number one on the Scottish Albums Chart and spent a combined total of thirty one weeks within the top 100 of the Scottish Albums Charts. Elsewhere in Europe, Hi charted at number 10 on the French Albums Chart and number 32 in Germany.

== Track listing ==
Standard version
No.	Title	Writer(s)	Length
1.	"Mr Haze"	Sharleen Spiteri, Johnny McElhone, Jack McElhone, Richard Hawley, Giorgio Moroder, Pete Bellotte, Donna Summer	3:39
2.	"Hi (with the Wu-Tang Clan)"	Spiteri, Johnny McElhone, Jack McElhone, Robert Hodgens, Robert Diggs, Dennis Cole	2:51
3.	"Just Want to Be Liked"	Spiteri, Johnny McElhone, Jack McElhone, Angelica Bjornsson	3:00
4.	"Unbelievable"	Spiteri, Johnny McElhone, Jack McElhone, Karen Overton, Penny Lamb	3:31
5.	"Moonstar"	Spiteri, Johnny McElhone, Jack McElhone	2:57
6.	"Dark Fire"	Spiteri, Johnny McElhone, Hawley	2:21
7.	"Look What You've Done"	Spiteri, Johnny McElhone, Jack McElhone, Hodgsen, Bjornsson	3:11
8.	"Heaven Knows"	Spiteri, Johnny McElhone, Overton	3:43
9.	"You Can Call Me"	Spiteri, Johnny McElhone, Jack McElhone, Bjornsson	3:10
10.	"Sound of My Voice"	Spiteri, Johnny McElhone, Overton	3:34
11.	"Falling"	Spiteri, Johnny McElhone, Jack McElhone, Bjornsson	3:56
12.	"Hi (single mix)"	Spiteri, Johnny McElhone, Jack McElhone, Hodgens	2:51

Deluxe edition bonus tracks
No.	Title	Writer(s)	Length
13.	"Had a Hard Day"	Spiteri, Johnny McElhone, Jack McElhone, Bjornsson	3:04
14.	"Had to Leave"	Spiteri, Johnny McElhone, Jack McElhone, Bjornsson	3:17

== Charts ==
=== Weekly charts ===
Chart performance for Hi
Chart (2021)	Peak position
Belgian Albums (Ultratop Flanders)	15
Belgian Albums (Ultratop Wallonia)	6
French Albums (SNEP)	10
German Albums (Offizielle Top 100)	32
Scottish Albums (Official Charts)	1
Spanish Albums (Promusicae)	55
Swiss Albums (Schweizer Hitparade)	5
UK Albums (Official Charts)	3
UK Independent Albums (Official Charts)	1

=== Year-end charts ===
Year-end chart performance for Hi
Chart (2021)	Position
French Albums (SNEP)	184
