= Can't Resist =

2005 single by Texas

Single by Texas

from the album Red Book
- B-side: "Say Hello"; "Call on You"
- Released: 31 October 2005
- Recorded: 2005
- Genre: Alternative rock
- Length: 3:51
- Label: Mercury Records; 98747 79/84/90
- Songwriter: McElhone/Spiteri
- Producer: Johnny Mac

Texas singles chronology
"Getaway" (2005)	"Can't Resist" (2005)	"Sleep" (2006)

Can't Resist is a single from Scottish band Texas and the second to be taken from their album Red Book. The song was released on 31 October 2005 and reached #13 on the UK Singles Chart.

A free limited edition slip-case was made available by mail to house all three formats.

== Track listing ==
=== CD1 (9874779) ===
1. "Can't Resist" - 3:51
2. "Say Hello" - 3:02

=== CD2 (9874784) ===
1. "Can't Resist" - 3:51
2. "I Don't Want a Lover" (Live Acoustic) - 4:14
3. "Say What You Want" (Live Acoustic) - 3:46
4. "Can't Resist" (Deadguysuk Mix) - 7:41

=== DVD Ltd Edition (9874790) ===
1. "Can't Resist" (Video) - 3:19
2. "Call on You" (Audio) - 3:17
3. "Introducing Red Book" (Interview) - 3:29
4. "The Abbey Road Acoustic Session" (Video Snippets) - 1:59

== Charts ==
Chart (2005)	Peak position
UK Singles Chart	13
