= Mothers Heaven =

Studio album by Texas
- Released: 23 September 1991
- Recorded: 1990–1991
- Studio: Park Lane Studios, Glasgow; The Mill Recording Studios, Berkshire; The Paradiso, Amsterdam
- Genre: Alternative rock
- Length: 47:36
- Label: Mercury; Vertigo (US/Canada)
- Producer: Tim Palmer

Texas chronology
Everyday Now (1989)	Mothers Heaven (1991)	Ricks Road (1993)

Singles from Mothers Heaven
- 1. "Why Believe in You" Released: 26 August 1991; 2. "In My Heart" Released: 14 October 1991; 3. "Alone with You" Released: 27 January 1992; 4. "Mothers Heaven" Released: 2 June 1992

Mothers Heaven is the second album from the Scottish rock band Texas. The album was released on 23 September 1991 by Mercury Records and spawned four singles – "Why Believe in You", "In My Heart", "Alone with You" and "Mothers Heaven". It largely failed to replicate the commercial success of their debut album released in 1989. Whilst it reached number thirty-two in the United Kingdom, it experienced greater commercial success in continental European markets, reaching the top twenty in Switzerland and being certified 2x Gold by the National Syndicate of Phonographic Publishing (SNEP) in France for sales in excess of 200,000 copies.

== Background information ==
The album saw the release of four singles, the lead single released from Mothers Heaven was entitled "Why Believe in You" which only managed to reach #66 on the UK Singles Charts in September 1991. Follow on single, the alternative rock track, "In My Heart" was released on 14 October 1991 but only managed to reach #74 in the United Kingdom. However, "In My Heart" became Texas's last song to date to chart in the United States, peaking at #14 on the Billboard Hot Rock Tracks chart. The song also reached #44 in France.

The release of a third single was based entirely on the success of the band in countries such as France, Spain and other European countries, as the band's singles were doing particularly poorly in their native United Kingdom. The third single, "Alone with You", saw Texas return to the UK Singles Charts Top 40 (for the first time since their debut single three years earlier), peaking at #32. The single also continued the success of the band in France, reaching #28. The fourth and final single, a remix of the title track "Mothers Heaven" was released in 1992, but failed to chart in any countries. Ironically, after the disappointing performance of singles from the album, the band then released a new cover version of the Al Green classic "Tired of Being Alone", which returned them to the UK Top 20. The track was not available on any album until the band's Greatest Hits album released in 2000.

Mothers Heaven is the band's lowest charting album in the UK where it remains uncertified, however, it has been certified Gold in both France and Switzerland.

== Critical reception ==
Professional ratings
Review scores
Source	Rating
AllMusic	3/5 stars
NME	6/10

AllMusic Guide gave the album three stars out of five, and commented:

Texas is a good name for this band, whose sound is open, brooding and just a bit on the twangy side; if you can imagine a sound somewhere between the dour, minimalist bluesiness of Cowboy Junkies and the yearning, gospel-tinged bombast of early U2, you'll have a good idea what to expect. Singer Sharleen Spiteri has the perfect voice for this kind of thing: it's low-pitched and dark-hued, and is shown off to best effect when she's belting out big, cathartic numbers like the title track and "Why Believe in You." Ally McErlaine is a brilliant slide guitarist who can move from grungy, greasy rock to desolate acoustic Delta blues without missing a beat. It's true that the group still needs to digest its influences a bit -- "Dream Hotel," in particular, sounds like a U2 reject—but most of the time, Texas does a good job of mapping out its own territory. And this is just their second album, remember. ~ Rick Anderson, All Music Guide

== Track listing ==
=== International release ===
All songs written by Johnny McElhone and Sharleen Spiteri except as indicated.

No.	Title	Writer(s)	Length
1.	"Mothers Heaven"		5:46
2.	"Why Believe in You"		4:09
3.	"Dream Hotel"		4:22
4.	"This Will All Be Mine"		2:57
5.	"Beliefs"		6:45
6.	"Alone with You"		4:43
7.	"In My Heart"		4:15
8.	"Waiting"		1:50
9.	"Wrapped in Clothes of Blue"		4:17
10.	"Return"		2:34
11.	"Walk the Dust"	Ally McErlaine / McElhone / Spiteri	6:04
Total length:			47:36

== Personnel ==
- Recorded at: Park Lane Studios, Glasgow, Scotland and The Mill Recording Studios, Cookham, Berkshire.

Texas

- Ally McErlaine - guitar
- Johnny McElhone - bass
- Sharleen Spiteri - vocals, guitar
- Eddie Campbell - keyboards
- Richard Hynd - drums

Other Personnel

- Engineer - George Shilling, Kenny MacDonald, Simon Vinestock
- Mastered By - Bob Ludwig
- Producer - Tim Palmer
- Voice [Call Out Stuart Kerr Gouranga, Be Happy] - Stuart Kerr
- Backing Vocals on Track 1 - Maria McKee

== Charts ==
Chart performance for Mothers Heaven
Chart (1991)	Peak position
Australian Albums (ARIA)	74
Dutch Albums (Album Top 100)	37
German Albums (Offizielle Top 100)	39
New Zealand Albums (RMNZ)	40
Spanish Albums (AFYVE)	15
Swedish Albums (Sverigetopplistan)	35
Swiss Albums (Schweizer Hitparade)	17
UK Albums (OCC)	32

== Certifications and sales ==
Region	Certification	Certified units/sales
France (SNEP)	2× Gold	200,000^{*}
Switzerland (IFPI Switzerland)	Gold	25,000^{^}
^{*} Sales figures based on certification alone.^{^} Shipments figures based on certification alone.
