= Getaway (Texas song) =

2005 single by Texas

Single by Texas

from the album Red Book
- B-side: "Like an Angel"; "Say"
- Released: 1 August 2005
- Length: 3:55
- Label: Mercury
- Songwriters: Johnny McElhone; Sharleen Spiteri
- Producer: Johnny Mac

Texas singles chronology
"I'll See It Through" (2003)	"Getaway" (2005)	"Can't Resist" (2005)

Getaway is a song by Scottish band Texas, released on 1 August 2005 as the first single from their seventh studio album, Red Book (2005). The song was successful, peaking at number six on the UK Singles Chart and becoming the band's 12th top-10 single. "Getaway" also debuted at number six in Denmark, becoming the band's highest-charting single there. A free limited edition slip-case was made available by mail to house all three formats.

== Track listings ==
UK CD1 and European CD single

1. "Getaway" – 3:53
2. "Like an Angel" – 4:15

UK CD2

1. "Getaway"
2. "Getaway" (acoustic)
3. "Say"

UK DVD single

1. "Getaway" (video)
2. "Getaway" (audio)
3. "Black Eyed Boy" (live on Radio 2)
4. "Making of the Video"

European maxi-CD single

1. "Getaway" – 3:55
2. "Getaway" (acoustic) – 3:51
3. "Say" – 3:43
4. "Black Eyed Boy" (live on Radio 2) – 3:26

== Charts ==
=== Weekly charts ===
Weekly chart performance for "Getaway"
Chart (2005)	Peak position
Belgium (Ultratop 50 Flanders)	43
Belgium (Ultratip Bubbling Under Wallonia)	4
CIS Airplay (TopHit)	55
Denmark (Tracklisten)	6
France (SNEP)	59
Germany (GfK)	59
Ireland (IRMA)	34
Italy (FIMI)	33
Netherlands (Single Top 100)	97
Norway (VG-lista)	18
Russia Airplay (TopHit)	53
Scotland Singles (OCC)	2
Sweden (Sverigetopplistan)	41
Switzerland (Schweizer Hitparade)	45
Ukraine Airplay (TopHit)	57
UK Singles (OCC)	6

=== Year-end charts ===
Year-end chart performance for "Getaway"
Chart (2005)	Position
CIS Airplay (TopHit)	194
Russia Airplay (TopHit)	192
