= Red Book (album) =

Studio album by Texas
- Released: 7 November 2005
- Recorded: 2004–2005
- Studios: Abbey Road Studios, London
- Genre: Alternative rock
- Length: 44:17
- Label: Mercury
- Producers: Johnny McElhone, Brian Higgins, Dallas Austin, Rick Nowels

Texas chronology
I Don't Want a Lover: The Collection (2004)	Red Book (2005)	The BBC Sessions (2007)

Singles from Red Book
- 1. "Getaway" Released: 1 August 2005; 2. "Can't Resist" Released: 31 October 2005; 3. "Sleep" Released: 9 January 2006; 4. "What About Us" Released: 21 February 2006

Professional ratings
Review scores
Source	Rating
AllMusic	3.5/5 stars
PopMatters	(8/10)
BBC Online	(positive)
musicOMH	(positive)

Red Book is the seventh album from Scottish rock band Texas. It was released on 7 November 2005 and is named after the little red book that singer Sharleen Spiteri used to write the album songs. The album yielded two UK Top Ten singles, "Getaway" and "Sleep" and the UK Top 20 single, "Can't Resist". Four of the album's tracks were co-written with Brian Higgins of Xenomania — "Can't Resist", "Cry", "Get Down Tonight" and "Bad Weather".

It peaked within the top ten of the national albums charts in their native Scotland, as well as in France and Switzerland. Red Book was the group's last studio album before their hiatus which they embarked on after the Red Book tour. Lead singer Spiteri would go on to release her debut solo album, Melody in 2008.

== Background ==
The bands previous album, Careful What You Wish For (2003), was considered somewhat of a disappointment commercially. Whilst it charted strongly across European albums charts, and achieved Gold certifications in both Switzerland and the United Kingdom, it failed to match the success of the bands previous studio albums White on Blonde (1997) and The Hush. In 2000, the band released their first compilation album, The Greatest Hits, which went onto sell over four million copies internationally. Following the release of "I'll See It Through" as the second single from Careful What You Wish For, record label Mercury Records decided not to release a third single from the album due to its lack of success, only reaching number forty in the United Kingdom, thus, the band began work on their next album.

Red Book was credited as returning the band "with what amounts to a near-perfect blend of their strongest effort", with PopMatters suggesting that "Red Book contains both the hits and heart-felt songwriting that defines their sophisticated adult-pop". The album was described as "a pretty pastel solvent to Careful What You Wish For", further described as being "far from a disaster". Described as "another stylishly coiffed transitional offering", Texas would begin a hiatus following the release of the album, as it had been suggested by critics that "the group had exhausted themselves" with the release of Red Book.

== Critical reception ==
Writing in All Music, William Ruhlmann said of the album "across seven studio albums released at regular intervals over 16 years, Texas has maintained a focus on accessible pop/rock music that serves as a foundation for lead singer Sharleen Spiteri's evocative vocals. Within that focus, however, the band has tacked around considerably, and anyone comparing Red Book with 1989's debut, Southside, would hear considerable change". He further commented on the album "the human element, of course, is Spiteri, but on many tracks her vocals are doubled, filtered, or otherwise altered, reducing the soulful and individual characteristic that has tended to make Texas identifiable no matter what style it was dabbling in at any given moment. The vocals get clearer as the album goes on, a turning point coming with the sixth track (and third single), "Sleep," a duet with Paul Buchanan of the Blue Nile. The sentiments are simple enough -- "Let me sleep so I can dream of you," Spiteri and Buchanan coo to each other -- but then, Spiteri's lyrics rarely stray far from the good love/bad love dichotomy of most pop music. And at least here some personality emerges from the drum and keyboard programming, as it also does, to at least some extent, on a few of the other later songs".

Trevor Lord, writing for the BBC, commented on the album "it's hard to see Texas as a band nowadays. In the same way that Simply Red is Mick Hucknall, Texas have become the Sharleen Spiteri show. There's very little which is distinctive about this album other than her voice, which carries the show along quite nicely, thank you. Red Book clearly aims to appeal to the Adult Orientated Pop market. Sharing producers with Gwen Stefani and Girls Aloud helps to achieve a suitably slick backdrop to Sharleen's musings on love's fickle ways. Stand out tracks? "Sleep", a duet with The Blue Nile's Paul Buchanan, would move any but the most hard hearted. But to be honest, this isn't an album of stand out moments it's more something to wallow in; the aural equivalent of a long soak in a hot tub".

== Commercial performance ==
Released as the follow up to Careful What You Wish For (2003), which had been considered as a commercial disappointment due to its failure to match the previous success the band achieved with their albums White on Blonde (1997) and The Hush (1999), Red Book looked in a strong position for the band. The lead single from the album, "Getaway", was a commercial success for the band, reaching the top ten in the United Kingdom, Denmark and the Ultratip Bubbling Under Wallonia Charts in Belgium. In their native Scotland, it reached number two on the Scottish Singles Charts.

On week ending 19 November 2005, Red Book debuted at number sixteen on the UK Albums Charts. During its initial chart run following its release, it spent seven weeks within the UK Top 100. Following the release of the albums third single "Sleep" in January 2006, the album returned to the UK Albums Charts at number fifty-seven on 21 January 2006, spending a further seven weeks within the UK Top 100. In their native Scotland, it debuted at number six on the Scottish Albums Charts. In France, it peaked within the Top 10 of the French Albums Charts at number nine, spending a total of sixteen weeks within the French charts. It spent only one week on the album charts in Germany, Sweden, Ireland and the Netherlands, following debut appearances at number forty-three, sixty, seventy-four and ninety-nine respectively.

It was certified Gold by the British Phonographic Industry (BPI) in the United Kingdom in December 2005, indicating sales in excess of 100,000 copies.

== Track listing ==
No.	Title	Writer(s)	Producer(s)	Length
1.	"036"	Johnny McElhone, Sharleen Spiteri	McElhone	0:36
2.	"Getaway"	McElhone, Spiteri, Robert Hodgens	McElhone	3:51
3.	"Can't Resist"	McElhone, Spiteri, Brian Higgins	Higgins, McElhone	3:47
4.	"What About Us"	Dallas Austin, McElhone, Spiteri	Austin	4:16
5.	"Cry"	McElhone, Spiteri, Higgins	Higgins, McElhone	4:27
6.	"Sleep" (featuring Paul Buchanan)	McElhone, Spiteri	McElhone	4:06
7.	"Get Down Tonight"	McElhone, Spiteri, Higgins	Higgins, McElhone	3:45
8.	"Nevermind"	McElhone, Spiteri, Hodgens	McElhone	4:32
9.	"Bad Weather"	McElhone, Spiteri, Higgins	Higgins, McElhone	3:59
10.	"Masterthief"	McElhone, Spiteri	McElhone	3:18
11.	"Just Hold On"	McElhone, Spiteri, Rick Nowels	Nowels, McElhone	3:27
12.	"Red Book"	McElhone, Spiteri, Hodgens, Michael Bannister	McElhone	4:13
13.	"Say" (iTunes Bonus track)	McElhone, Spiteri	McElhone	3:42
Total length:				47:59

== Personnel ==
- Backing Vocals - Michael Bannister (tracks: 4, 8, 10), Miranda Cooper (tracks: 3, 5, 7), Sharleen Spiteri (tracks: 2 to 5, 7, 8, 10)
- Bass - Johnny McElhone (tracks: 2, 8 to 10)
- Guitar - Ally McErlaine (tracks: 2, 4, 7, 8, 10 to 12), Johnny McElhone (tracks: 2, 7 to 10, 12), Sharleen Spiteri (tracks: 2, 8 to 10, 12), Shawn Lee (tracks: 3, 5, 7), Tony McGovern (tracks: 7, 9, 12)
- Keyboards - Johnny McElhone (tracks: 1 to 4, 7, 8 to 12), Michael Bannister (tracks: 1 to 4, 8, 10, 12), Sharleen Spiteri (tracks: 1 to 4, 8, 9, 11), Tim Powell (tracks: 3, 5, 7)
- Mixed By - Mark "Spike" Stent (tracks: 3 to 5, 7, 9), Mike Hedges (tracks: 6, 8, 10, 12)
- Piano - Michael Bannister (tracks: 6, 8, 10, 12)
- Producer [Co Producer] - Johnny Mac (tracks: 4)
- Programmed By - Johnny McElhone (tracks: 2 to 4, 8, 11), Michael Bannister (tracks: 2 to 4), Sharleen Spiteri (tracks: 2 to 4, 11)
- Vocals - Sharleen Spiteri

== Charts ==
Weekly chart performance for Red Book
Chart (2005)	Peak position
Belgian Albums (Ultratop Flanders)	21
Belgian Albums (Ultratop Wallonia)	22
Croatian International Albums (HDU)	14
French Albums (SNEP)	9
Dutch Albums (Album Top 100)	99
German Albums (Offizielle Top 100)	43
Scottish Albums (Official Charts)	6
Spanish Albums (Promusicae)	27
Swedish Albums (Sverigetopplistan)	60
Swiss Albums (Schweizer Hitparade)	10
UK Albums (Official Charts)	16

== Certifications ==
Region	Certification	Certified units/sales
United Kingdom (BPI)	Gold	100,000^{^}
^{^} Shipments figures based on certification alone.
