= Thrill Has Gone =

1989 single by Texas

Single by Texas

from the album Southside
- B-side: "Nowhere Left to Hide"; "Dimples"
- Released: 24 April 1989
- Genre: Pop rock
- Length: 3:32
- Label: Mercury; Phonogram
- Songwriters: Johnny McElhone; Sharleen Spiteri
- Producer: Tim Palmer

Texas singles chronology
"I Don't Want a Lover" (1989)	"Thrill Has Gone" (1989)	"Everyday Now" (1989)

Music video
- "Thrill Has Gone" on YouTube

"Thrill Has Gone" is the second single released from Scottish band Texas's first studio album, Southside (1989). The song peaked at number 60 on the UK Singles Chart and number 19 in New Zealand, becoming their last top-20 hit there until "Say What You Want (All Day, Every Day)" in 1998.

== Critical reception ==
Jerry Smith, reviewer of British music newspaper Music Week, called this track a "memorable slice of smooth rock/pop... marked by another stunning vocal" equal to band's previous hit "I Don't Want a Lover" and expressed an assurance that it will "bring more success". Edem E. Ephraim and Dennis Fuller of London Boys, being host reviewers of singles column of Number One on 26 April 1989, considered that the song's sound more oriented to the American market, but both singers noticed that it has something. Tim Nicholson of Record Mirror labeled it "dull drag of AOR" and said that the track's title speaks for itself. He wrote: "None of the energy or inspiration of ″I Don't Want a Lover″ lives here, a ball and chain attached to its best leg every time it tries to move forward." As reviewers for the singles section of Melody Maker, The Stud Brothers left a sarcastic review of the single. They called Texas “a well-turned-out empty space, a nothingness that's neither frightful nor frightening” and declared their indifference to the band's records.»

== Track listings ==
7-inch single

A. "Thrill Has Gone"
B. "Nowhere Left to Hide"

12-inch and CD single

1. "Thrill Has Gone"
2. "Nowhere Left to Hide"
3. "Dimples"
- Another version of the 12-inch single that included a free "Thrill Has Gone" tour poster was also released.

== Charts ==
Weekly chart performance for "Thrill Has Gone"
Chart (1989)	Peak position
Australia (ARIA)	60
New Zealand (Recorded Music NZ)	19
UK Singles (Official Charts)	60
West Germany (GfK)	73
