= Let's Work It Out =

Single by Texas

from the album Jump on Board
- Released: 9 February 2017
- Recorded: 2016–2017
- Studio: Abbey Road Studios, London
- Length: 3:23
- Label: BMG; PIAS
- Songwriters: Johnny McElhone; Sharleen Spiteri; Jack McElhone; Angelica Bjornsson
- Producer: Johnny McElhone

Texas singles chronology
| "Start a Family" (2015) | "Let's Work It Out" (2017) | "Tell That Girl" (2017) |

"Let's Work It Out" is a song by Scottish alternative rock band Texas, released in February 2017 as the lead single from their ninth studio album, Jump on Board (2017). The single was released via PIAS and BMG.

== Background ==
The song was co-written by Sharleen Spiteri and Johnny McElhone, with Johnny McElhone serving as the producer for the track. The band recorded the track during recording sessions during 2016–2017 during sessions for their then upcoming studio album, Jump on Board.

The track features the lyrics, eventually inspiring the name of the album Jump on Board. "Go away, go away It's a mad day I jumped on board I wasn't thinking about anything"

== Release and promotion ==
To coincide with the release of the single, Texas performed the track live on The Chris Evans Breakfast Show on BBC Radio 2 on 9 February 2017. The track was added to the BBC Radio 2 playlist and received heavy airplay, beginning on 9 February 2017. Additionally, lead singer Sharleen Spiteri also had guest appearances on UK television programmes Saturday Kitchen and BBC Breakfast.

Texas performed the track with the BBC Scottish Symphony Orchestra in June 2017 as part of a BBC special, where they performed other of their hits including "Black Eyed Boy" and "Summer Son", amongst others.

== Commercial performance ==
Whilst the single failed to chart in the United Kingdom or their native Scotland, it did chart on both Belgian regions' Ultratip charts, reaching number nine on the Flanders Tip chart.

== Music video ==
The accompanying music video for the single features Spiteri performing the track in front of neon letters which spell "Let's Work it Out", a giant disco ball and driving with football star Thierry Henry in a motor vehicle through a city street at nighttime.

== Charts ==
Chart performance for "Let's Work It Out"
| Chart (2017) | Peak position |
|---|---|
| Belgium (Ultratip Bubbling Under Flanders) | 9 |
| Belgium (Ultratip Bubbling Under Wallonia) | 29 |
