= Hi (song) =

Single by Texas featuring Wu-Tang Clan

from the album Hi
- Released: 1 December 2020
- Recorded: 2020
- Length: 2:51
- Label: BMG
- Songwriters: Eddie Campbell; Robert Hodgens; Sharleen Spiteri; Johnny McElhone; Jack McElhone; RZA; Ghostface Killah
- Producers: John McElhone; Angelica Bjornsson

Texas singles chronology
"Can't Control" (2017)	"Hi" (2020)	"Mr Haze" (2021)

Wu-Tang Clan singles chronology
"People Say" (2017)	"Hi" (2020)

"Hi" is a song by Scottish alternative rock band Texas featuring American hip hop group Wu-Tang Clan, released as the lead single from their tenth studio album of the same name (2021). The track was written by Eddie Campbell, Robert Hodgens, Sharleen Spiteri, Johnny McElhone, Jack McElhone, Robert Diggs, and Dennis Cole and was produced by John McElhone and Angelica Bjornsson. The single was released in December 2020 through BMG.

== Background and recording ==
"Hi" is the second collaboration between Texas and Wu-Tang Clan, after both previously collaborated in 1998 with a re-worked version of Texas' 1997 hit single "Say What You Want" re-titled as "Say What You Want (All Day, Every Day)". The 1998 release proved to be a commercial success, reach the top ten in the United Kingdom, Iceland, Scotland, Belgium and New Zealand. The success of the single lead to a performance from both Texas and Wu-Tang Clan at the 1998 BRIT Awards.

Although the song is titled "Hi" as in someone saying hello to another, Spiteri claims the song is actually about "getting high on love". The release of the song marked the first new material from Wu-Tang Clan since 2017's The Saga Continues.

Originally, Spiteri had passed the track to RZA from Wu-Tang Clan to mix and finalise the recording, however, after hearing the track, RZA was keen for Wu-Tang Clan to become involved, leading to an official collaboration.

== Promotion and release ==
"Hi" received its first radio airplay by Zoe Ball on her BBC Radio 2 breakfast show.

== Commercial performance ==
The song appeared on the Wallonia Ultratip chart in Belgium, where it charted at number 50 on 23 January 2021.

== Music video ==
The official music video premiered on the band's YouTube channel on 1 December 2020, the same day the single was officially released. The video begins with the 1998 BRIT Awards performance between Texas and Wu-Tang Clan performing "Say What You Want (All Day, Every Day)". The video then cuts to the present day, where actor Kadeem Ramsay is seen driving an old Volvo car down a country road. The music video features very little of Spiteri and RZA and Wu-Tang Clan, with Spiteri making only an appearance towards the end of the video where it is revealed that Ramsay's character has kidnapped her, later she is sitting on top of the Volvo 740 at dusk, with Ramsay standing beside her, the pair sharing a joint. RZA makes an appearance at the end of the video through a video call.

== Charts ==
Chart performance for "Hi"
Chart (2021)	Peak position
Belgium (Ultratip Bubbling Under Wallonia)	50
