= Guitar Song =

2001 single by Texas

Single by Texas

from the album The Greatest Hits
- B-side: "Guitar Song" (live)
- Released: 29 December 2001
- Length: 3:55
- Label: Universal Music Belgium; 568 910-2
- Songwriter(s): Johnny McElhone, Sharleen Spiteri, Serge Gainsbourg
- Producer(s): Johnny Mac

Texas singles chronology
"I Don't Want a Lover (2001 remix)" (2001)	"Guitar Song" (2001)	"Carnival Girl" (2003)

"Guitar Song" is a single released by Scottish band Texas, taken from their greatest hits album The Greatest Hits. It contains a sample of the song "Je t'aime... moi non plus" performed by Serge Gainsbourg and Jane Birkin. The song was released in 2001 exclusively in Belgium, where it charted inside the top 50 in both Flanders and Wallonia.

== Track listing ==
=== CD single (568 910-2) ===
1. "Guitar Song" (album version) — 3:55
2. "Guitar Song" (live) — 5:01

== Credits ==
- Mixed by — Ash Howes
- Produced by — Johnny Mac
- Written by — Johnny McElhone, Sharleen Spiteri, Serge Gainsbourg

== Chart performance ==
Chart (2001)	Peak position
Belgian Singles Chart — Flanders	32
Belgian Singles Chart — Wallonia	46
