= Everyday Now (EP) =

EP by Texas
- Released: 1989
- Recorded: 1989
- Genre: Alternative rock, pop rock
- Label: Mercury
- Producer: Texas

Texas chronology
Southside (1989)	Everyday Now (1989)	Mothers Heaven (1991)

Everyday Now is an EP released by the Scottish band Texas released in 1989. The EP was released through Mercury Records and included three studio tracks and three live tracks. In the UK, it was released as a special edition 12" single, limited to 5000 copies.

== Track listing ==
All tracks are written by Johnny McElhone and Sharleen Spiteri, except where noted.

Side A (Studio)
No.	Title	Length
1.	"Everyday Now"	4:39
2.	"Believe Me"	4:00
3.	"All in Vain"	3:46

Side B (Live)
No.	Title	Writer(s)	Length
4.	"Everyday Now"		4:56
5.	"It Hurts Me Too"	Elmore James; Marshall Sehorn	3:45
6.	"Living for the City"	Stevie Wonder	7:12

Side B recorded live at the Paradiso, Amsterdam, June 1989 by KRO Radio.
