= In My Heart (Texas song) =

1991 single by Texas

Single by Texas

from the album Mothers Heaven
- B-side: "Is What I Do Wrong?"; "You Gave Me Love"
- Released: 14 October 1991
- Length: 4:14
- Label: Mercury
- Songwriter(s): Johnny McElhone; Sharleen Spiteri
- Producer(s): Tim Palmer

Texas singles chronology
"Why Believe in You" (1991)	"In My Heart" (1991)	"Alone with You" (1991)

"In My Heart" is a song by Scottish band Texas, released as the second single from their second studio album, Mothers Heaven (1991). It reached number 74 on the UK Singles Chart, where it remains the band's lowest-charting single. Elsewhere, the song reached number 32 in New Zealand and number 44 in France, and it was the group's second single to chart in the United States, reaching number 14 on the Billboard Modern Rock Tracks chart.

== Track listings ==
UK 7-inch single and Australasian CD single

1. "In My Heart"
2. "Is What I Do Wrong?"

UK 12-inch and CD single

1. "In My Heart"
2. "Is What I Do Wrong?"
3. "You Gave Me Love"
4. "In My Heart" (remix)

== Charts ==
Weekly chart performance for "In My Heart"
Chart (1991–1992)	Peak position
Australia (ARIA)	92
France (SNEP)	44
New Zealand (Recorded Music NZ)	32
UK Singles (OCC)	74
US Modern Rock Tracks (Billboard)	14

== Release history ==
Release dates and formats for "In My Heart"
Region	Date	Format(s)	Label(s)	Ref.
United Kingdom	14 October 1991	7-inch vinyl; 12-inch vinyl; CD; cassette	Mercury	
Australia	10 February 1992	CD; cassette	Mercury	
