= Carnival Girl =

2003 single by Texas

Single by Texas featuring Kardinal Offishall

from the album Careful What You Wish For
- B-side: "Night for Day"
- Released: 29 September 2003
- Studio: Various
- Length: 4:05
- Label: Mercury
- Songwriter(s): Sharleen Spiteri; Johnny McElhone; Jason Harrow
- Producer(s): Johnny Mac

Texas singles chronology
"Guitar Song" (2001)	"Carnival Girl" (2003)	"I'll See It Through" (2003)

Kardinal Offishall singles chronology
"Back for More" (2003)	"Carnival Girl" (2003)	"Tear de Wallz Down" (2004)

"Carnival Girl" is a song by Scottish band Texas featuring Canadian rapper Kardinal Offishall. It was released as a DVD single in Australia on 29 September 2003, then was issued on CD and DVD in the United Kingdom on 6 October. It was the first single to be taken from the band's seventh studio album, Careful What You Wish For (2003). The song reached number nine on the UK Singles Chart and became a top-20 hit in Denmark and Spain.

== Track listings ==
UK CD1; European and Australian CD single

1. "Carnival Girl" – 4:07
2. "Carnival Girl" (Kardinal Offishall remix) – 3:45

UK CD2

1. "Carnival Girl"
2. "Night for Day"
3. "Carnival of Dub" featuring Suncycle
4. "Carnival Girl" (video)

European maxi-CD single

1. "Carnival Girl" – 4:08
2. "Night for Day" – 3:44
3. "Carnival Girl" (Kardinal Offishall remix) – 3:44
4. "Carnival Girl" (video)

UK and Australian DVD single

1. "Carnival Girl" (video)
2. "Silver Chain"
3. "Carnival Girl" (Kardinal Offishall remix)

== Credits and personnel ==
Credits are taken from the Careful What You Wish For album booklet.

Studios

- Recorded at various studios in Scotland, England, and Canada
- Mastered at Metropolis Mastering (London, England)

Personnel

- Sharleen Spiteri – writing, vocals, guitar, piano, keyboards
- Johnny McElhone – writing, guitar, bass, piano, keyboards, programming
- Kardinal Offishall – writing (as Jason Harrow), featured vocals
- Tony McGovern – vocals, guitar, programming
- Ally McErlaine – guitar
- Eddie Campbell – piano, keyboards, programming
- Neil Payne – drums
- Johnny Mac – production
- Mark "Spike" Stent – mixing
- Tim Young – mastering

== Charts ==
Chart (2003)	Peak position
Belgium (Ultratip Bubbling Under Flanders)	3
Belgium (Ultratip Bubbling Under Wallonia)	2
Denmark (Tracklisten)	15
France (SNEP)	57
Germany (GfK)	94
Ireland (IRMA)	43
Romania (Romanian Top 100)	61
Scotland (OCC)	5
Spain (PROMUSICAE)	14
Switzerland (Schweizer Hitparade)	41
UK Singles (OCC)	9

== Release history ==
Region	Date	Format(s)	Label(s)	Ref.
Australia	29 September 2003	DVD	Mercury	
United Kingdom	6 October 2003	CD; DVD	Mercury	
Australia	13 October 2003	CD	Mercury	
