= Tell That Girl =

Single by Texas

from the album Jump on Board
- Released: 28 March 2017
- Recorded: 2016
- Studio: Abbey Road Studios, London
- Genre: Alternative rock
- Length: 3:23
- Label: PIAS
- Songwriter(s): Sharleen Spiteri, Johnny McElhone, Karen Overton
- Producer(s): Johnny McElhone

Texas singles chronology
"Let's Work It Out" (2017)	"Tell That Girl" (2017)	"Midnight" (2017)

"Tell That Girl" is a 2017 single released by Scottish alternative rock band Texas as the second single from their ninth studio album Jump on Board (2017). The song was released in March 2017 through PIAS Records and was written by Sharleen Spiteri, Johnny McElhone, Karen Overton, with McElhone serving as the songs producer.

== Background and recording ==
The song was written by two members of the band, Spiteri and McElhone, with McElhone serving as the producer for the song. The song also had writing input from Karen Overton, who had previously collaborated with the band during writing sessions for their eighth studio album The Conversation (2013).

== Promotion and release ==
The song received its first airplay on BBC Radio 2 on 28 March 2017.

== Music video ==
The music video for "Tell That Girl" was filmed within a few hours at The Poetry Club in Glasgow. The video features members of the band joined by Game of Thrones actor Rory McCann on drums, along with Sharleen filming scenes for the video in Paris.

== Commercial performance ==
"Tell That Girl" appeared on the Ultratip Wallonia charts in Belgium, where it charted at number 45 during the week of 27 May 2017.

== Chart performance ==
Chart performance for "Tell That Girl"
Chart (2017)	Peak position
Belgium (Ultratip Bubbling Under Wallonia)	45
