= Put Your Arms Around Me (Texas song) =

1997 single by Texas

Single by Texas

from the album White on Blonde
- B-side: "Never Never"; "You're All I Need to Get By"
- Released: 3 November 1997
- Studio: The Church (London, England)
- Length: 4:32 (album version); 4:28 (Autumn Breeze mix)
- Label: Mercury
- Songwriters: Johnny McElhone; Sharleen Spiteri; Dave Stewart; Robert Hodgens
- Producers: Dave Stewart; Texas

Texas singles chronology
"Black Eyed Boy" (1997)	"Put Your Arms Around Me" (1997)	"Say What You Want (All Day, Every Day)" / "Insane" (1998)

Music video
- "Put Your Arms Around Me " on YouTube

"Put Your Arms Around Me" is a song by Scottish alternative rock band Texas, released on 3 November 1997 by Mercury as the fourth single from their fourth studio album, White on Blonde (1997). The song peaked at number six on the Scottish Singles Chart and number 10 on the UK Singles Chart. The Autumn Breeze mix, which was the version released as a single, was included on the soundtrack to Ever After.

== Release and promotion ==
"Put Your Arms Around Me" was released as the fourth single from the bands fourth studio album White on Blonde (1997), released via Mercury Records on 3 November 1997. During the time of its release, Texas were said to be one of the most played artists on radio stations across Europe, with previous singles "Say What You Want", "Halo" and "Black Eyed Boy" spending five and two weeks atop radio airplay respectively. During the release week of "Put Your Arms Around Me", it lodged a total of 616 plays on radio airplay, with 19 plays on Capital Radio and eight on BBC Radio 1. To promote the single release, Texas performed an acoustic, stripped back, version of "Put Your Arms Around Me" on Later...with Jools Holland, featuring Jools Holland on piano.

Upon its release, "Put Your Arms Around Me" was described as one of a number of "a batch of strong releases" by Music and Media.

== Critical reception ==
Andy Gill from The Independent remarked that "looming strings are carried on a slowed-down breakbeat" on songs such as "Put Your Arms Around Me". A reviewer from Music Week gave it four out of five, adding, "Sharleen Spiteri's voice has rarely sounded better than on this re-recorded version of the White On Blonde ballad which is likely to be championed on Chris Evans' Virgin Radio Breakfast Show."

== Commercial performance ==
In their native Scotland, "Put Your Arms Around Me" debuted at number six on the official Scottish Singles Chart. In the United Kingdom, it charted just within the top 10, reaching number 10 on the UK Singles Chart, and remained in top 100 for eight weeks. In France, it debuted at number 67 and spent a total of five weeks on the French Singles Chart, and on the Eurochart Hot 100, it debuted at number 28.

== Track listings ==
- UK CD1
1. "Put Your Arms Around Me" (Autumn Breeze mix) – 4:28
2. "Never Never" – 3:45
3. "You're All I Need to Get By" (Mary Ann Hobbs session) – 4:08
4. "Put Your Arms Around Me" (Ambient mix) – 5:30
- UK CD2
1. "Put Your Arms Around Me" (Autumn Breeze mix) – 4:28
2. "Put Your Arms Around Me" (Breath mix) – 8:35
3. "Put Your Arms Around Me" (Spooky Soul mix) – 5:06
4. "Put Your Arms Around Me" (Shimmering Sun mix) – 5:34
5. "Put Your Arms Around Me" (Electric for Bird mix) – 5:31
6. "Put Your Arms Around Me" (Spooky Dub mix) – 5:48

Note: Limited edition with four postcards.

- UK cassette single
1. "Put Your Arms Around Me" (Autumn Breeze mix) – 4:28
2. "You're All I Need to Get By" (Mary Ann Hobbs session) – 4:08

== Personnel ==
Personnel are lifted from The Greatest Hits album booklet.

- Texas – production
  - Johnny McElhone – writing, keyboards, programming
  - Sharleen Spiteri – writing, programming
  - Ally McErlaine – guitars
  - Eddie Campbell – keyboards, programming
  - Richard Hynd – programming
- Dave Stewart – writing, guitars, production
- Robert Hodgens – writing
- Alex Silva – additional programming and keyboards
- Terry Disley – additional programming and keyboards
- Ash Howes – mix engineering

== Charts ==
Chart (1997–1998)	Peak position
Australia (ARIA)	166
Europe (Eurochart Hot 100)	28
France (SNEP)	67
Scotland Singles (OCC)	6
UK Singles (OCC)	10
