= Jump on Board =

Studio album by Texas
- Released: 21 April 2017
- Recorded: 2016–2017
- Studio: Abbey Road Studios, London, England
- Genre: Alternative rock
- Length: 37:22
- Label: BMG; PIAS
- Producer: Johnny McElhone

Texas chronology
Texas 25 (2015)	Jump on Board (2017)	Hi (2021)

Singles from Jump on Board
- 1. "Let's Work It Out" Released: 9 February 2017; 2. "Tell That Girl" Released: 28 March 2017; 3. "Midnight" Released: 9 July 2017; 4. "Can't Control" Released: 1 September 2017

Professional ratings
Aggregate scores
Source	Rating
Metacritic	52/100
Review scores
Source	Rating
AllMusic	3/5 stars
Albuism	4/5 stars
Classic Rock	3/5 stars
Contactmusic.com	2/5 stars
The Skinny	3/5 stars

Jump on Board is the ninth studio album by Scottish alternative rock band Texas, released worldwide in April 2017. The lead single from the album, "Let's Work It Out", was released in February 2017 and charted in the singles chart in France and the Ultratip Bubbling Under charts in both the Flanders and Wallonia regions of Belgium. The second single, "Tell That Girl", was released in March 2017, just prior to the official release of the album. A further two singles – "Midnight" and "Can't Control" were released to promote the album.

A commercial success for the band, it reached number one on the albums charts in France and in their native Scotland, and finished the year as the 93rd best selling album of 2017 in France.

== Background and promotion ==
In an interview with Fault Magazine, Spiteri said that the writing process for the album began "in bits and pieces", citing the reason being that following the release of their last album, they were unsure what to expect considering the fact they had not produced a new album in a substantial period of time. Reflecting on the reception their last album, The Conversation received, Spiteri recognised that the band still had a strong fan base and had remained "relevant" despite embarking on an "indefinite hiatus" in 2005 after the release of their seventh album Red Book. The albums lead single, "Let's Work It Out", was originally written "8 to 10 years" prior to its inclusion on Jump on Board, but it was never finished until it resurfaced during the writing sessions for the album.

Spiteri's vocal range on Jump on Board was praised for "knowing no bounds" and was credited for not having lost "its seductive qualities". Musically, the album draws inspirations from artists including Chrissie Hynde and Diana Ross, and whilst described in many regards as "fantastic arena rock", it was also noted for its "skyscraping ballad" style on the track "Round the World" which was attributed to Spiteri being credited as an artist who "that rarely gets her due". McElhone and McErlaine were also praised for their musical styles throughout the album, with Albumism saying that "instrumentation is determined, but not too forceful, lending a layered quality to Jump On Board where its grooves reveal themselves upon subsequent spins".

The band embarked on a UK and European promotional campaign to promote the release of the album and later commenced touring the album during the Jump on Board Live Tour during the winter of 2017.

== Performance and reviews ==
The album was generally well received by music critics, with Metacritic giving the album 52/100. Classic Rock awarded the album three out of five available stars, and said that the band were "back to prove they still matter on this self-produced set". Additionally, they claimed that "Spiteri gets to live out her female icon fantasies, echoing Debbie Harry’s sublime blankness on "Tell That Girl" and "Great Romances" and Lana Del Rey’s noir fatale on "Sending A Message"". Contact Music were less favourable of the album, awarding only two stars out of five, and said "in its best moments, the songs are momentarily pleasant as opposed to lasting joy". They also commented on Spiteri's performance on "Can't Control", saying that on the song she "produces a sultry vocal performance", advocating that whilst this "style worked so well on "Summer Son", in reality on "Can't Control" it resulted "here in a hypnotic cut".

Jump on Board achieved commercial success in the band's native Scotland where it debuted at number one on the Scottish Album Charts. The album performed well in both the United Kingdom and France, where it debuted within the top ten of both album charts, reaching number one in France, giving the band their eighth French top ten album. The album was certified Gold by the National Syndicate of Phonographic Publishing (SNEP) in France for sales in excess of 50,000 copies, and finished the year as the 93rd best selling album of 2017 in France, and the 90th best selling album of the year in Belgium.

== Singles ==
The lead single, "Let's Work It Out", was released in early 2017 to critical acclaim. The song was added to several playlists on British radio station BBC Radio 2 where it enjoyed strong airplay. Despite this airplay, the song failed to make any chart impact on any British singles chart, either physical single sales, digital download or independent chart releases. The second single to be released from Jump on Board, "Tell That Girl", was released just prior to the formal release of the album in March 2017. Again, whilst failing to chart on the United Kingdom or any other mainstream single charts across the European continent, "Tell That Girl" enjoyed strong airplay on BBC Radio 2 throughout both April and May 2017, making playlists including Great British Songbook and Today's Top Hits.

== Track listing ==
Jump on Board track listing
No.	Title	Writer(s)	Length
1.	"Let's Work It Out"	Johnny McElhone, Sharleen Spiteri, Jack McElhone, Angelica Bjornsson	3:42
2.	"Can't Control"	Johnny McElhone, Sharleen Spiteri, Jack McElhone, Jack Flanagan, Angelica Bjornsson	3:43
3.	"For Everything"	Johnny McElhone, Sharleen Spiteri, Jack McElhone, Angelica Bjornsson	4:32
4.	"It Was Up to You"	Johnny McElhone, Sharleen Spiteri, Jack McElhone, Angelica Bjornsson	3:18
5.	"Tell That Girl"	Johnny McElhone, Sharleen Spiteri, Karen Overton	3:26
6.	"Sending a Message"	Johnny McElhone, Sharleen Spiteri, Lauren Spiteri, Angelica Bjornsson	3:10
7.	"Great Romances"	Johnny McElhone, Sharleen Spiteri, Karen Overton	3:28
8.	"Won't Let You Down"	Johnny McElhone, Sharleen Spiteri, Ian Watts	4:59
9.	"Midnight"	Johnny McElhone, Sharleen Spiteri, Jack McElhone, Karen Overton	3:18
10.	"Round the World"	Johnny McElhone, Sharleen Spiteri, Jack McElhone, Angelica Bjornsson	3:46
Total length:			37:22

== Charts ==
=== Weekly charts ===
Chart (2017)	Peak position
Belgian Albums (Ultratop Flanders)	8
Belgian Albums (Ultratop Wallonia)	3
French Albums (SNEP)	1
German Albums (Offizielle Top 100)	63
Scottish Albums (OCC)	1
Spanish Albums (Promusicae)	23
Swiss Albums (Schweizer Hitparade)	12
UK Albums (OCC)	6
UK Independent Albums (OCC)	2

=== Year-end charts ===
Chart (2017)	Position
Belgian Albums (Ultratop Wallonia)	90
French Albums (SNEP)	93

== Certifications ==
Region	Certification	Certified units/sales
France (SNEP)	Gold	50,000^{‡}
^{‡} Sales+streaming figures based on certification alone.
