= The Greatest Hits (Texas album) =

Greatest hits album by Texas
- Released: 23 October 2000
- Recorded: 1988–2000
- Genre: Pop rock; alternative rock; downtempo; blue-eyed soul; trip hop
- Length: 65:59 (Note: The UK special edition, including the tracks "Insane" and "Tired of Being Alone", runs for 74:10.)
- Label: Mercury
- Producer: Dallas Austin; Dave Stewart; Gregg Alexander; Johnny Mac; Mike Hedges; Texas; Tim Palmer

Texas chronology
The Hush (1999)	The Greatest Hits (2000)	Careful What You Wish For (2003)

Singles from The Greatest Hits
- 1. "In Demand" Released: 25 September 2000; 2. "Inner Smile" Released: 8 January 2001; 3. "I Don't Want a Lover (2001 mix)" Released: 9 July 2001; 4. "Guitar Song" Released: 2001

Professional ratings
Review scores
Source	Rating
AllMusic	4.5/5 stars

The Greatest Hits is a compilation album by Scottish rock band Texas, released on 23 October 2000. It was the band's first greatest hits album, featuring songs spanning their career from 1989 to 2000. Three new singles were also included: "In Demand", "Inner Smile" and "Guitar Song".

Two extra bonus tracks appear on the UK edition of the album that do not appear on the international edition. In territories where the group did not chart any major hits, the album was simply renamed Song Book. Four previously released songs ("So in Love with You", "So Called Friend", "Everyday Now" and "Prayer for You") were also re-recorded for this album.

The Greatest Hits peaked at number one in the UK, becoming the band's third album to do so. It has been certified 6× Platinum by the British Phonographic Industry for UK sales of 1,974,890 copies. The Greatest Hits was a big seller within the United Kingdom and was the 42nd best-selling album of the 2000s decade in the United Kingdom.

== Track listing ==
All tracks are written by Johnny McElhone and Sharleen Spiteri, except where noted.

No.	Title	Writer(s)	Album	Length
1.	"I Don't Want a Lover"		Southside (1989)	5:02
2.	"In Demand"	Spiteri, McElhone, Dallas Austin	Previously unreleased	4:25
3.	"Say What You Want"		White on Blonde (1997)	3:51
4.	"Summer Son"	Spiteri, McElhone, Eddie Campbell, Robert Hodgens	The Hush (1999)	4:04
5.	"Inner Smile"	Spiteri, McElhone, Gregg Alexander, Rick Nowels	Previously unreleased	3:52
6.	"So in Love with You"		Ricks Road (1993)	4:19
7.	"Black Eyed Boy"	Spiteri, McElhone, Campbell, Hodgens, Richard Hynd	White on Blonde	3:17
8.	"So Called Friend"		Ricks Road	3:46
9.	"Everyday Now"		Southside	4:19
10.	"In Our Lifetime"		The Hush	4:06
11.	"Halo"		White on Blonde	4:09
12.	"Guitar Song"	Spiteri, McElhone, Serge Gainsbourg (sample)	Previously unreleased	3:56
13.	"Prayer for You"		Southside	4:19
14.	"When We Are Together"		The Hush	3:23
15.	"Insane" (UK special edition only)		White on Blonde	4:44
16.	"Tired of Being Alone" (UK special edition only)	Al Green	Single-release only	3:27
17.	"Put Your Arms Around Me"	Spiteri, McElhone, David Stewart, Hodgens	White on Blonde	4:32
18.	"Say What You Want (All Day Every Day)" (featuring the Wu-Tang Clan)		Non-album double A-side single with "Insane"	4:39
Total length:				65:59 / 74:10

Limited edition bonus disc
No.	Title	Length
1.	"Say What You Want" (Rae & Christian mix)
2.	"Summer Son" (Giorgio Moroder mix)
3.	"Black Eyed Boy" (Trailermen Black Eyed Disco mix)
4.	"In Our Lifetime" (Jules' Disco Trip mix)
5.	"In Demand" (Sunship mix)
6.	"Put Your Arms Around Me" (Weatherall's Electric for Bird mix)
7.	"I Don't Want a Lover" (Music video)
8.	"Halo" (Music video)
9.	"In Demand" (Music video)

Deluxe edition bonus disc
No.	Title	Length
1.	"Say What You Want" (Rae & Christian mix)
2.	"Summer Son" (Giorgio Moroder mix)
3.	"Black Eyed Boy" (Trailermen Black Eyed Disco mix)
4.	"In Our Lifetime" (Jules' Disco Trip mix)
5.	"In Demand" (Sunship mix)
6.	"Put Your Arms Around Me" (Weatherall's Electric for Bird mix)
7.	"Inner Smile" (Rae & Christian Basement mix)
8.	"So In Love With You" (Youth mix)
9.	"I'll See It Through" (Roger Sanchez mix)

International version
No.	Title	Length
1.	"I Don't Want a Lover"
2.	"In Demand"
3.	"Say What You Want"
4.	"Summer Son"
5.	"Inner Smile"
6.	"So in Love with You"
7.	"Black Eyed Boy"
8.	"So Called Friend"
9.	"Everyday Now"
10.	"In Our Lifetime"
11.	"Halo"
12.	"Guitar Song"
13.	"Prayer for You"
14.	"When We Are Together"
15.	"Put Your Arms Around Me"
16.	"Say What You Want (All Day Every Day)" (featuring the Wu-Tang Clan)
17.	"I Don't Want a Lover" (2001 mix) (French re-release bonus track)

== Charts ==
=== Weekly charts ===
Weekly chart performance for The Greatest Hits
Chart (2000–2001)	Peak position
Australian Albums (ARIA)	144
Austrian Albums (Ö3 Austria)	7
Belgian Albums (Ultratop Flanders)	2
Belgian Albums (Ultratop Wallonia)	2
Danish Albums (Hitlisten)	6
Dutch Albums (Album Top 100)	16
Finnish Albums (Suomen virallinen lista)	16
French Albums (SNEP)	190
German Albums (Offizielle Top 100)	11
Hungarian Albums (MAHASZ)	33
Italian Albums (FIMI)	24
New Zealand Albums (RMNZ)	40
Norwegian Albums (VG-lista)	5
Scottish Albums (OCC)	1
Spanish Albums (AFYVE)	2
Swedish Albums (Sverigetopplistan)	8
Swiss Albums (Schweizer Hitparade)	6
UK Albums (OCC)	1

Weekly chart performance for The Greatest Hits
Chart (2003)	Peak position
Scottish Albums (OCC)	50
UK Albums (OCC)	65

Weekly chart performance for The Greatest Hits
Chart (2004)	Peak position
Scottish Albums (OCC)	47
UK Albums (OCC)	54

Weekly chart performance for The Greatest Hits
Chart (2008)	Peak position
Scottish Albums (OCC)	36
UK Albums (OCC)	49

Weekly chart performance for The Greatest Hits
Chart (2013)	Peak position
UK Albums (OCC)	97

=== Year-end charts ===
2000 year-end chart performance for The Greatest Hits
Chart (2000)	Peak position
Belgian Albums (Ultratop Flanders)	33
Belgian Albums (Ultratop Wallonia)	24
European Albums (Music & Media)	69
French Compilations (SNEP)	3
Spanish Albums (AFYVE)	49
Swiss Albums (Schweizer Hitparade)	64
UK Albums (OCC)	7

2001 year-end chart performance for The Greatest Hits
Chart (2001)	Peak position
Belgian Albums (Ultratop Flanders)	7
Belgian Albums (Ultratop Wallonia)	8
Danish Albums (Hitlisten)	52
European Albums (Music & Media)	23
Swiss Albums (Schweizer Hitparade)	52
UK Albums (OCC)	31

== Certifications ==
Certifications for The Greatest Hits
Region	Certification	Certified units/sales
Belgium (BRMA)	2× Platinum	100,000^{*}
Denmark (IFPI Danmark)	Platinum	50,000^{^}
Germany (BVMI)	Gold	150,000^{^}
Netherlands (NVPI)	Gold	40,000^{^}
Spain (Promusicae)	Platinum	100,000^{^}
Switzerland (IFPI Switzerland)	2× Platinum	100,000^{^}
United Kingdom (BPI)	6× Platinum	1,974,890
Summaries
Europe (IFPI)	4× Platinum	4,000,000^{*}
^{*} Sales figures based on certification alone.^{^} Shipments figures based on certification alone.
