= Careful What You Wish For (Texas album) =

Studio album by Texas
- Released: 20 October 2003
- Recorded: 2002–2003
- Studio: Olympic Studios, West London; SARM West Studios, London; Whitfield Street Recording Studios, London; Elevator Studios, Liverpool; Phase One Studios, Toronto; Shar's House, Glasgow, Scotland
- Genre: Alternative rock
- Length: 42:38
- Label: Mercury
- Producer: Johnny McElhone, Trevor Horn, Ian Broudie, Ceri "Sunship" Evans

Texas chronology
The Greatest Hits (2000)	Careful What You Wish For (2003)	I Don't Want a Lover: The Collection (2004)

Singles from Careful What You Wish For
- 1. "Carnival Girl" Released: 29 September 2003; 2. "I'll See It Through" Released: 8 December 2003

Careful What You Wish For is the sixth album by Scottish rock band Texas, released 20 October 2003. Released on the backdrop of their 2000 compilation album The Greatest Hits which had sold over four million copies internationally by the time Careful What You Wish For was released, it spawned two singles, the commercial successful "Carnival Girl", featuring Canadian rapper Kardinal Offishall, and the second single, "I'll See It Through", which failed to match the success of "Carnival Girl".

Due to the lack of commercial success of the second single "I'll See It Through", record label, Mercury Records, decided not to release a third single from the album, prompting the band to re–enter the recording studio to begin work on what would be their next album, 2005's Red Book. The album went on to achieve gold status in the UK for 100,000 copies sold, and achieved Gold certification in Switzerland for sales in excess of 20,000.

== Background ==
The recording sessions for Careful What You Wish For took place in recording studios located in London, Liverpool, Toronto, New York City and their home city Glasgow. Described as "most diverse & ambitious album to date" upon release in 2003, it features collaborations with Sun Cycle, pop producer and former The Buggles singer and bassist Trevor Horn, studio producer Kingbird, Ceri 'Sunship' Evans, songwriter Guy Chambers and Spike Stent. During the process of recording the album, Texas had recruited a new guitarist to join the band, and their first compilation album, The Greatest Hits (2000) had enjoyed major commercial success, selling more than five million copies internationally.

The albums artwork was noted for its dominance of lead singer Sharleen Spiteri, whilst the rest of the band members were omitted from the cover art. Careful What You Wish For was described as "a bit of a struggle" by Pop Rescue. It further commented that "it feels like there were some ideas for which direction Texas should head, and so they decided to try them all. The use of rappers in this Scottish pop-rock band just doesn’t work though, as bold as that might have been. Inevitably, it’s a mixed bag. A bumpy ride".

On the albums lead single "Carnival Girl", Texas collaborated with Canadian rapper Kardinal Offishall.

== Release and reception ==
Only two singles were produced from Careful What You Wish For. The first was the hit UK top-10 single, "Carnival Girl" which reached number nine on the UK Singles Chart and was also a hit in other European countries. A second single, "I'll See It Through", was released in December 2003. However, the single was less successful than the release of "Carnival Girl", only debuting at number 40 on the UK Singles Chart. After this their record label, Mercury Records, decided not to release a third single from the album, and this led Texas to re-enter the studio to start work on their next album, Red Book (2005).

== Commercial performance ==
In their native Scotland, Careful What You Wish For debuted at number four on the Scottish Albums Charts, whereas in the United Kingdom, it debuted at number five on the UK Albums Charts. During its initial period of release, it spent only four weeks on the UK Albums Chart, last appearing at number seventy-four on week ending 22 November 2003, before re–entering the UK Top 100 at number eighty-three on week ending 13 December 2003. It would spend another four weeks on the chart during its re–entry period, spending a combined total of eight weeks within the UK Top 100. In France, it debuted at number five on the French Albums Charts, and spent a total of fifteen weeks on the albums charts in France.

Elsewhere across Europe, it reached number six in Switzerland, and spent a total of six weeks on the Swiss Albums Charts, number twenty-five in Germany, spending three weeks on the German Albums Charts, and debuted at number forty-six in Austria, spending three weeks on the Austrian Albums Charts. In the Wallonia region of Belgium, it reached number seven on the Ultratip Wallonia Albums Charts and spent thirteen weeks on the chart, whereas in the Flanders region of Belgium, it debuted at number ten, spending a combined total of seventeen weeks on the Flanders charts. It peaked within the Top 40 of the albums charts in Sweden, Norway and Denmark, charting at number twenty-eight, thirty-five and twenty-three respectively. It was less successful in the Netherlands, where it spent only one week on the Dutch Albums Charts following a debut appearance at number eighty-eight.

It received Gold certification in both Switzerland and the United Kingdom. In Switzerland, it sold in excess of 20,000 copies, and in excess of 100,000 copies in the United Kingdom.

== Track listing ==
No.	Title	Writer(s)	Producer(s)	Length
1.	"Telephone X"	Johnny McElhone, Sharleen Spiteri, Eddie Campbell, Tony McGovern	Johnny McElhone, Trevor Horn	3:43
2.	"Broken"	McElhone, Spiteri, Guy Chambers	McElhone, Ian Broudie	3:27
3.	"Carnival Girl" (featuring Kardinal Offishall)	McElhone, Spiteri, Jason Harrow	McElhone	4:03
4.	"I'll See It Through"	McElhone, Spiteri, Chambers	McElhone	4:04
5.	"Where Did You Sleep?"	McElhone, Spiteri, Chambers	McElhone	4:02
6.	"And I Dream"	McElhone, Spiteri	McElhone	3:58
7.	"Careful What You Wish For"	McElhone, Spiteri	McElhone	3:31
8.	"Big Sleep"	McElhone, Spiteri	McElhone	2:33
9.	"Under Your Skin"	McElhone, Spiteri, McGovern	McElhone	3:43
10.	"Carousel Dub" (featuring Suncycle)	McElhone, Spiteri, Suncycle, Ceri Evans	McElhone	2:06
11.	"Place in My World" (featuring Dolomite)	McElhone, Spiteri, Evans, Williamson	McElhone, Ceri Evans	3:53
12.	"Another Day"	McElhone, Spiteri	McElhone	3:43
Total length:				42:38

== Personnel ==
Texas

- Sharleen Spiteri – vocals, guitar, piano, keyboards
- Ally McErlaine – guitar
- Johnny McElhone – guitar, bass, piano, keyboards
- Tony McGovern – guitar, vocals
- Eddie Campbell – piano, keyboards
- Neil Payne – drums (track 3)

Production

- Tim Young – mastering
- Johnny Mac – producer

== Chart positions ==
=== Weekly charts ===
Chart (2003)	Peak position
Austrian Albums (Ö3 Austria)	46
Belgian Albums (Ultratop Flanders)	10
Belgian Albums (Ultratop Wallonia)	7
Danish Albums (Hitlisten)	23
Dutch Albums (Album Top 100)	88
French Albums (SNEP)	5
German Albums (Offizielle Top 100)	25
Irish Albums (IRMA)	35
Norwegian Albums (VG-lista)	35
Spanish Albums (AFYVE)	10
Swedish Albums (Sverigetopplistan)	28
Swiss Albums (Schweizer Hitparade)	6
UK Albums (OCC)	5
Scottish Albums (OCC)	4

=== Year-end charts ===
Chart (2003)	Position
French Albums (SNEP)	187
Swiss Albums (Schweizer Hitparade)	82
UK Albums (OCC)	184

== Certifications and sales ==
Region	Certification	Certified units/sales
Switzerland (IFPI Switzerland)	Gold	20,000^{^}
United Kingdom (BPI)	Gold	100,000^{^}
^{^} Shipments figures based on certification alone.
