= Prayer for You =

"Prayer For You"

Single by Texas

from the album Southside
- B-side: "Return"
- Released: 13 November 1989
- Recorded: 1988
- Length: 4:47
- Label: Phonogram; TEX 4
- Songwriter(s): McElhone / Spiteri
- Producer(s): Tim Palmer

Texas singles chronology
"Everyday Now" (1989)	"Prayer For You" (1989)	"Why Believe in You" (1991)

"Prayer For You" is the fourth and final single to be taken from the album Southside by Scottish band Texas. Despite a variety of formats it failed to make the UK Singles Chart Top 40 - only managing to reach #73.

== Track listing ==
=== CD1 (TEX CD4) ===
1. "Prayer For You" - 4:47
2. "I Don't Want a Lover" (Live) - 6:29
3. "Return" - 3:10
4. "Prayer For You" (Acoustic Version) - 3:41
- "I Don't Want a Lover" was recorded live at the Paradiso in Amsterdam.

=== CD2 'Remixes' (TXCDR 4) ===
1. "Prayer For You" (Southside Remix) - 5:19
2. "Prayer For You" (Northside Remix) - 6:51

== Charts ==
Chart (1989–1990)	Peak position
Australian Singles Chart	101
Dutch Singles Chart	31
UK Singles Chart	73
