= Mr Haze =

Single by Texas

from the album Hi
- Released: 6 April 2021
- Recorded: 2020–2021
- Genre: Soul, dance-rock
- Length: 3:39
- Label: BMG
- Songwriters: Giorgio Moroder; Donna Summer; Robert Hodgens; Pete Bellotte; Sharleen Spiteri; Johnny McElhone; Jack McElhone
- Producers: John McElhone; Angelica Bjornsson

Texas singles chronology
"Hi" (2020)	"Mr Haze" (2021)	"Moonstar" (2021)

"Mr Haze" is a song by Scottish alternative rock band Texas, released in April 2021 as the second single from their tenth studio album Hi (2021). The song features a sample of Donna Summer's 1977 hit "Love's Unkind", and, as a result, Summer is credited as a co-writer.

== Background and recording ==
The song was written by Giorgio Moroder, Pete Bellotte, Donna Summer, Robert Hodgens, Sharleen Spiteri, Johnny McElhone and Jack McElhone. The song was written and recorded during a number of recording sessions during the lockdown of the COVID-19 pandemic during various sessions in Scotland, Wales, the United States and Sweden.

The song is described as a "soul soaked" Motown-inspired track, paying tribute to Donna Summer's influence by using a sample. Speaking about the inspiration and background for the song, lead singer Sharleen Spiteri said "Our excitement at finding this treasure trove of songs collided with our excitement back then and, unplanned, new songs started coming. You could say we were inspired by ourselves".

== Composition ==
Heavily influence by the 1977 hit "Love's Unkind" by Donna Summer, "Mr Haze" is described as "a soul-soaked Motown belter driven by a Donna Summer sample". Lead singer Sharleen Spiteri says that the songs composition is "deliberately cinematic", claiming that all previous Texas albums have "at least one cinematic song" in the track listing. Furthermore, Spiteri commented that "Morricone in particular is still a huge influence [on the band]. We're referencing our past but also writing from the position we're in now. Being able to stand back from what you've achieved gives you a different perspective. Our aim has only ever been to make great music".

Spiteri refers to "Mr Haze" as having a "big screen feel" to its composition, musical arrangements and songwriting.

== Release and promotion ==
"Mr Haze" was released as the second promotional single from the bands tenth studio album Hi which was released in May 2021. "Mr Haze" was released in April 2021 and received its debut performance on radio on The Zoe Ball Breakfast Show on BBC Radio 2. During the week of 1–7 May 2021, "Mr Haze" was the Record of the Week on BBC Radio 2 and as a result received heavy airplay on the station. In the United Kingdom, it peaked at number twenty-one on the UK Singles Downloads Chart and spent six weeks within its top one hundred, and peaked at twenty-two on the UK Singles Sales Charts.

To promote the release of "Mr Haze", Texas appeared on The Chris Evans Breakfast Show on Virgin Radio in May 2021, where they performed the track live, as well as performing a cover of "Come On Eileen" by Dexys Midnight Runners, their hit single "Summer Son" and another song from Hi, the title track, "Hi". Texas appeared on The One Show on BBC One across the United Kingdom on 25 May 2021 to promote "Mr Haze", as well as the forthcoming release of the album Hi. The band performed a live performance of "Mr Haze" on the programme broadcast.

Since its release, "Mr Haze" has received considerable amounts of airplay on radio stations internationally, the most in the United Kingdom, where, as of June 2021, has received 174 plays on British radio, and in Belgium, where it has received 153 plays on Belgian radio stations. The song also made an appearance on the Ultratip charts in Belgium as a result of heavy airplay and promotion.

== Music video ==
Spiteri in the video for "Mr Haze"

The music video was released prior to the release of the single and to coincide with the release of the song to radio airplay. The music video was directed by Simone Smith and stars Gladiator actor Tommy Flanagan. The video for "Mr Haze" was filmed in Glasgow, and features various psychedelic undertones, which sees lead singer, Sharleen Spiteri and Tommy Flanagan dancing against a sun-drenched backdrop.

Flanagan and Spiteri have been close friends since their childhood, and when asked about working together with Flanagan, Spiteri said that it was "so great to be working with my old friend and now Hollywood star Tommy Flanagan, we met at 14 years old and will always be that age to me".

== Commercial performance ==
"Mr Haze" charted at number 50 on the Ultratip Wallonia charts in Belgium during the week of 19 June 2021. The single debuted at number one on the British iTunes charts and peaked at number 86 on the British Apple Music charts based on downloads and streams. Whilst it failed to chart on the official singles charts in the United Kingdom, it spent six weeks within the top one hundred of both the UK Singles Downloads Charts and the UK Singles Sales Charts, following peak positions of number twenty-one and twenty-two respectively.

== Charts ==
Chart performance for "Mr Haze"
Chart (2021)	Peak position
United Kingdom Singles Sales (OCC)	22
United Kingdom Singles Download (OCC)	21
Belgium (Ultratop 50 Flanders)	50
