= Insane (Texas song) =

1998 single by Texas

Single by Texas

from the album White on Blonde
- A-side: "Say What You Want (All Day, Every Day)"
- B-side: "Polo Mint City"
- Released: 9 March 1998
- Length: 4:45
- Label: Mercury
- Songwriters: Johnny McElhone, Sharleen Spiteri
- Producers: Mike Hedges, Texas

Texas singles chronology
| "Put Your Arms Around Me" (1997) | "Say What You Want (All Day, Every Day)" / "Insane" (1998) | "In Our Lifetime" (1999) |

"Insane" is a song by Scottish band Texas and was the fifth and final single to be released from their fourth studio album White on Blonde. It was released as a double A-side with "Say What You Want (All Day, Every Day)" in 1998. The song was later included on their 2000 compilation album The Greatest Hits.

== Track listings ==
- UK CD1
1. "Insane" – 4:45
2. "Say What You Want (All Day, Every Day)" – 4:06
3. "Polo Mint City" (full version) – 2:50
4. "Say What You Want (All Day, Every Day)" (Trailermen mix) – 8:38
- UK CD2
1. "Say What You Want (All Day, Every Day)" (extended version) – 5:02
2. "Insane" (The Second Scroll) – 6:33
3. "Say What You Want (All Day, Every Day)" (RZA instrumental) – 5:13
4. "Insane" (The Second Scroll dub) – 6:35
- UK cassette single
1. "Say What You Want (All Day, Every Day)" – 4:06
2. "Insane" – 4:45

== Charts ==
All entries charted as a double A-side with "Say What You Want (All Day, Every Day)".

| Chart (1998) | Peak position |
|---|---|
| Ireland (IRMA) | 25 |
| Scotland Singles (OCC) | 4 |
| UK Singles (OCC) | 4 |

=== Year-end charts ===
| Chart (1998) | Position |
|---|---|
| UK Singles (OCC) | 129 |
