= I'll See It Through =

2003 single by Texas

Single by Texas

from the album Careful What You Wish For
- B-side: "What Do I Get"; "I'll Give It All Again"
- Released: 8 December 2003
- Length: 3:28
- Label: Mercury
- Songwriters: Johnny McElhone; Sharleen Spiteri; Guy Chambers
- Producer: Johnny Mac

Texas singles chronology
"Carnival Girl" (2003)	"I'll See It Through" (2003)	"Getaway" (2005)

"I'll See It Through" is a song by Scottish band Texas, released as the second single from their seventh studio album, Careful What You Wish For. The single was released on 8 December 2003 and charted at number 40 on the UK Singles Chart. The song appeared in the 2003 film Love Actually and was included on the album release of the film's original soundtrack.

== Track listings ==
CD1

1. "I'll See It Through" (radio edit) – 3:28
2. "What Do I Get" – 3:05
3. "I'll Give It All Again" – 3:47
4. "I'll See It Through" (Roger Sanchez remix) – 5:16
5. "I'll See It Through" (Guy Chambers remix) – 4:04

CD2

1. "I'll See It Through" (radio edit) – 3:28
2. "Tired of Being Alone" – 3:17

== Charts ==
Chart (2003)	Peak position
Scotland Singles (OCC)	23
UK Singles (OCC)	40
