= Black Eyed Boy =

1997 single by Texas

Single by Texas

from the album White on Blonde
- Released: 28 July 1997
- Length: 3:16
- Label: Mercury
- Songwriters: Johnny McElhone; Sharleen Spiteri; Robert Hodgens; Eddie Campbell; Richard Hynd
- Producer: Texas

Texas singles chronology
"Halo" (1997)	"Black Eyed Boy" (1997)	"Put Your Arms Around Me" (1997)

Music video
- "Black Eyed Boy" on YouTube

"Black Eyed Boy" is the third single from Scottish rock band Texas's fourth studio album, White on Blonde (1997). The song was released on 28 July 1997 by Mercury Records and reached number five on the UK Singles Chart. Elsewhere, the song reached the top 50 in Australia, Belgium, France, Ireland, Israel and Sweden.

== Critical reception ==
A reviewer from Music Week rated the song four out of five, noting that "Texas immerse themselves in Motown on this thumpingly catchy Supremes-sounding groove, conjuring up a perfect summer gift for radio." A few weeks later, it was given five out of five and picked as Single of the Week. The magazine stated that "Sharleen plays Diana Ross on the stand-out track from White On Blonde, its Motownalike euphoria pumped up even further in this single version. Will send the album shooting back up the chart." David Sinclair from The Times wrote in his review of White on Blonde, that "Black Eyed Boy" is "little more than the Supremes-by-numbers."

== Music video ==
The accompanying music video for "Black Eyed Boy", directed by Karen Lamond, is filmed in black-and-white and features the band performing the song whilst a man is shown washing his face, but leaves when he sees Sharleen Spiteri there with him. He is then seen in a nightclub where he sees Spiteri in the crowd and runs away. As he runs, he bumps into another version of Spiteri. At the end of the video, the man arrives in a tunnel which has many large pictures of Spiteri on each side. The pictures then burst into flames and the man runs down the tunnel.

== Track listings ==
- UK CD single
1. "Black Eyed Boy" (Summer Mix) – 3:16
2. "Sorry" – 4:33
3. "Black Eyed Disco" – 4:20
4. "Say What You Want" (Acoustic Mary Ann Hobbs Session) – 3:50
- UK limited-edition CD single—includes poster
1. "Black Eyed Boy" (Summer Mix radio) – 3:16
2. "Black Eyed Boy" (Trailermen's Black Eyed Disco) – 8:45
3. "Black Eyed Boy" (Trailermen's Disco Boy Dub) – 7:40
4. "Black Eyed Boy" (Neo-Northern Bossa Nova) – 4:53
5. "Black Eyed Boy" (Stoppa & Nobby's Madeye) – 6:23
6. "Black Eyed Boy" (album version) – 3:10
- European CD single
1. "Black Eyed Boy" (Summer Mix) – 3:16
2. "Fameless" – 4:21

== Personnel ==
Personnel are lifted from The Greatest Hits album booklet.

- Texas – production
  - Johnny McElhone – writing, keyboards, programming, additional production and mix (as Johnny Mac)
  - Sharleen Spiteri – writing, backing vocals, guitars, programming
  - Ally McErlaine – guitars
  - Eddie Campbell – writing, backing vocals, keyboards, programming
  - Richard Hynd – writing, drums, programming
- Robert Hodgens – writing, backing vocals
- Kenny MacDonald – mix engineering

== Charts ==
=== Weekly charts ===
Chart (1997)	Peak position
Australia (ARIA)	50
Belgium (Ultratop 50 Flanders)	34
Europe (Eurochart Hot 100)	29
France (SNEP)	29
Germany (GfK)	68
Iceland (Íslenski Listinn Topp 40)	16
Ireland (IRMA)	23
Israel (Israeli Singles Chart)	19
Netherlands (Single Top 100)	56
Scottish Singles Sales (Official Charts)	2
Sweden (Sverigetopplistan)	45
UK Singles (Official Charts)	5

=== Year-end charts ===
Chart (1997)	Position
UK Singles (OCC)	121
