= Why Believe in You =

1991 single by Texas

"Why Believe In You"

Single by Texas

from the album Mothers Heaven
- B-side: "How It Feels"; "Hold Me Lord"
- Released: 26 August 1991
- Length: 4:08
- Label: Mercury
- Songwriters: Johnny McElhone; Sharleen Spiteri
- Producer: Tim Palmer

Texas singles chronology
| "Prayer for You" (1989) | "Why Believe In You" (1991) | "In My Heart" (1991) |

"Why Believe In You" is a song by Scottish band Texas, released as the lead single from their second studio album, Mothers Heaven (1991). It reach number 66 on the UK Singles Chart, number 33 in the Netherlands, and number 73 in Australia.

== Track listings ==
UK 7-inch and cassette single, Australasian CD single

1. "Why Believe in You"
2. "How It Feels"

UK 12-inch and CD single

1. "Why Believe in You"
2. "How It Feels"
3. "Hold Me Lord"
- A limited-edition CD box set featuring the same tracks was also released.

Japanese mini-CD single

1. "Why Believe in You"
2. "Hold Me Lord"

== Charts ==
Weekly chart performance for "Why Believe in You"
| Chart (1991) | Peak position |
|---|---|
| Australia (ARIA) | 73 |
| Netherlands (Dutch Top 40) | 33 |
| Netherlands (Single Top 100) | 44 |
| UK Singles (OCC) | 66 |
| UK Airplay (Music Week) | 54 |

== Release history ==
Release dates and formats for "Why Believe in You"
| Region | Date | Format(s) | Label(s) | Ref. |
|---|---|---|---|---|
| United Kingdom | 26 August 1991 | 7-inch vinyl; 12-inch vinyl; CD; cassette | Mercury | |
| Australia | 7 October 1991 | CD; cassette | Mercury | |
| Japan | 25 October 1991 | Mini-CD | Mercury | |
