= Everyday Now =

1989 single by Texas

Single by Texas

from the album Southside
- B-side: "Waiting for the Fall"
- Released: 24 July 1989
- Genre: Blues
- Length: 4:37
- Label: Mercury; Phonogram
- Songwriters: Johnny McElhone; Sharleen Spiteri
- Producer: Tim Palmer

Texas singles chronology
"Thrill Has Gone" (1989)	"Everyday Now" (1989)	"Prayer for You" (1989)

"Everyday Now" is a song by Scottish band Texas. It was first recorded for the band's 1989 extended play (EP) of the same name and was released as a single on 24 July 1989 from their debut album, Southside (1989). The song debuted at number 58 on the UK Singles Charts and later peaked at number 44. The song has been described as "a bluesy ballad which drips with soul".

A re-recorded version of the song if included on Texas's 2000 compilation album, The Greatest Hits, and a live version of the song appears the album The BBC Sessions.

== Track listings ==
7-inch and cassette single

A. "Everyday Now"
B. "Waiting for the Fall"

12-inch single

A1. "Everyday Now"
B1. "Faith"
B2. "Waiting for the Fall"

CD single

1. "Everyday Now"
2. "Waiting for the Fall"
3. "Future Is Promises" (recorded at 'Out of the Blue' Studios)
4. "Fool for Love" (recorded live my Radio Clyde)

== Charts ==
Chart (1989)	Peak position
Australia (ARIA)	52
Europe (Eurochart Hot 100)	94
France (SNEP)	25
UK Singles (OCC)	44
