= Halo (Texas song) =

1997 single by Texas

Single by Texas

from the album White on Blonde
- B-side: "Asking for Favours"; "Coming Down"
- Released: 7 April 1997
- Studio: Abbey Road (London, England)
- Length: 4:10
- Label: Mercury
- Songwriters: Johnny McElhone; Sharleen Spiteri
- Producers: Texas; Mike Hedges

Texas singles chronology
"Say What You Want" (1997)	"Halo" (1997)	"Black Eyed Boy" (1997)

Alternative covers
- UK CD2 cover

Music video
- "Halo" on YouTube

"Halo" is a song by Scottish alternative rock band Texas, released on 7 April 1997 by Mercury Records as the second single from their fourth studio album, White on Blonde (1997). The song was written by Texas frontwoman Sharleen Spiteri and guitarist Johnny McElhone and was produced by Texas and Mike Hedges. "Halo" debuted and peaked at number three on the Scottish Singles Chart and number 10 on the UK Singles Charts. The accompanying music video, filmed in Hong Kong, features Spiteri and a Chinese woman acting as her "halo".

== Release and promotion ==
"Halo" was released as the second single from White on Blonde on 7 April 1997. It debuted at number 10 in the United Kingdom on 13 April 1997. During the song's second week it fell to number 17, and during its third week it fell to number 21. In its fourth week the song dropped to number 36, and in its fifth week it fell out the UK top 40 at number 51. In total, the song spent eight weeks on the UK Singles Chart. In the band's native Scotland, the single peaked at number three. Outside the UK, it reached number 27 in Iceland and briefly charted in the Flanders region of Belgium.

== Critical reception ==
Dominic Pride from Music & Media wrote that the song is "just as infectious" as "Say What You Want", "with building strings and one of the strongest hooks currently going." He added, "Texas have a knack of making songs which fit radio perfectly, and this one makes Sharleen Spiteri's voice virtually jump out of the speakers. As big a hit as the last one." A reviewer from Music Week rated it four out of five, saying, "This simply-structured, classic-sounding single produced by Mike Hedges boasts another breathtaking vocal from Sharleen Spiteri, and can only further emphasise what a superb comeback White On Blonde is." Ian Hyland from Sunday Mirror gave it a score of seven out of ten, describing it as "radio-friendly", with "strings and brass [that] combine with Deborah Harry-ish vocals to make the perfect breezy summer hit." David Sinclair from The Times noted "the staid string arrangements" of the song.

== Music video ==
The music video for "Halo" was filmed in Hong Kong in 1997 and begins with a Chinese man running through a street. It features Spiteri wearing a blue dress while singing the song in front of a brick wall. A Chinese woman wearing the same dress is also featured as her "halo". The video was inspired by the Wong Kar-wai film Chungking Express.

== Track listings ==
- UK CD1
1. "Halo" – 4:10
2. "Asking for Favours" – 3:49
3. "Coming Down" – 3:50
4. "Halo" (orchestral version) – 4:25
- UK CD2
1. "Halo" – 4:10
2. "Halo" (Rae & Christian mix) – 6:20
3. "Halo" (Rae & Christian dub) – 5:39
4. "Halo" (808 mix) – 5:25
5. "Halo" (808 dub) – 5:52

- UK cassette single and European CD single
1. "Halo" – 4:10
2. "Asking for Favours" – 3:49
- Australasian maxi-CD single
1. "Halo" – 4:10
2. "Halo" (Rae & Christian mix) – 6:20
3. "Halo" (Rae & Christian dub) – 5:39
4. "Halo" (808 mix) – 5:25
5. "Halo" (808 dub) – 5:52
6. "Say What You Want" (live) – 3:51

== Personnel ==
Personnel are lifted from The Greatest Hits album booklet.

- Texas – production
  - Johnny McElhone – writing, keyboards, programming, orchestra arrangement
  - Sharleen Spiteri – writing, guitars
  - Ally McErlaine – guitars
  - Eddie Campbell – keyboards, programming, orchestra arrangement
  - Richard Hynd – drums, programming
- Mike Hedges – production
- Martin Greene – orchestra arrangement

== Charts ==
=== Weekly charts ===
Chart (1997)	Peak position
Australia (ARIA)	163
Belgium (Ultratip Bubbling Under Flanders)	4
Europe (Eurochart Hot 100)	31
Iceland (Íslenski Listinn Topp 40)	28
Israel (Israeli Singles Chart)	6
Scottish Singles Sales (Official Charts)	3
UK Singles (Official Charts)	10

=== Year-end charts ===
Chart (1997)	Position
UK Singles (OCC)	168
