= Southside (Texas album) =

Studio album by Texas
- Released: 13 March 1989
- Recorded: September–November 1988
- Studios: Maison Rouge, London
- Genres: Rock; pop rock; alternative rock; country rock
- Length: 44:53
- Labels: Mercury; Vertigo (US/Canada)
- Producer: Tim Palmer

Texas chronology
Southside (1989)	Everyday Now (1989)

Singles from Southside
- 1. "I Don't Want a Lover" Released: 23 January 1989; 2. "Thrill Has Gone" Released: 24 April 1989; 3. "Everyday Now" Released: 5 August 1989; 4. "Prayer for You" Released: 13 November 1989

Southside is the debut album by Scottish rock band Texas. It was released on 13 March 1989. It peaked at no. 3 in the UK Albums Chart and within three weeks of release was certified Gold by the British Phonographic Industry for sales in excess of 100,000 copies. Worldwide, Southside has sold over 2 million copies.

== Background and release ==
The album's first single "I Don't Want a Lover" was released on 23 January 1989 and peaked at no. 8 in the UK Singles Chart. Following the release of the album in March of that year, which entered the UK Albums Chart at no.3, further singles from the album were less successful. The second single, "Thrill Has Gone", peaked at no. 60, while a third single, "Everyday Now", fared little better at no. 44. Despite this, a fourth single, "Prayer for You", was released on 13 November but stalled at no. 73 in the UK. Despite only one hit single, the album spent 29 weeks on the charts.

The album cover art was derived from the poster art for the film Paris, Texas, which inspired the band's name.

== Critical reception ==
Professional ratings
Review scores
Source	Rating
AllMusic	4/5 stars
The Encyclopedia of Popular Music	3/5 stars
MusicHound Rock: The Essential Album Guide	3/5 stars

The Los Angeles Times wrote that the album's strengths "revolve around the way the Scottish quartet fuses some of rock’s most appealing elements: the lonesome, sensual slide-guitar sound of Ry Cooder ... and vocals by Sharleen Spiteri that recall the liberating spirit and convincing character of the Pretenders’ Chrissie Hynde and Lone Justice's Maria McKee."

== Track listing ==
No.	Title	Writer(s)	Length
1.	"I Don't Want a Lover"	Johnny McElhone; Sharleen Spiteri	5:00
2.	"Tell Me Why"	McElhone; Spiteri	3:59
3.	"Everyday Now"	McElhone; Spiteri	4:33
4.	"Southside"	McElhone; Stuart Kerr; Spiteri; Ally McErlaine	2:00
5.	"Prayer for You"	McElhone; Spiteri	4:50
6.	"Faith" (CD only)	McElhone; Spiteri	4:19
7.	"Thrill Has Gone"	McElhone; Spiteri; Paul Fox	4:24
8.	"Fight the Feeling"	McElhone; Spiteri; Craig Armstrong	3:37
9.	"Fool for Love"	McElhone; Spiteri; Armstrong	3:54
10.	"One Choice"	McElhone; Spiteri	4:02
11.	"Future Is Promises"	McElhone; Spiteri; McErlaine	4:14

== Charts ==
=== Weekly charts ===
Chart (1989–1990)	Peak position
Australian Albums (ARIA)	14
Canada Top Albums/CDs (RPM)	45
Dutch Albums (Album Top 100)	25
French Albums (SNEP)	3
German Albums (Offizielle Top 100)	22
New Zealand Albums (RMNZ)	14
Swedish Albums (Sverigetopplistan)	14
Swiss Albums (Schweizer Hitparade)	1
UK Albums (Official Charts)	3
US Billboard 200	88
Chart (1999)	Peak position
Scottish Albums (Official Charts)	25

=== Year-end charts ===
Chart (1989)	Position
Australian Albums (ARIA)	50
German Albums (Offizielle Top 100)	100
Swiss Albums (Schweizer Hitparade)	12

== Certifications and sales ==
Region	Certification	Certified units/sales
Australia (ARIA)	Platinum	70,000^{^}
France (SNEP)	Platinum	600,000
Netherlands (NVPI)	Gold	50,000^{^}
Spain (Promusicae)	Platinum	100,000^{^}
Switzerland (IFPI Switzerland)	Platinum	50,000^{^}
United Kingdom (BPI)	Gold	100,000^{^}
Summaries
Worldwide	—N/a	2,000,000
^{^} Shipments figures based on certification alone.

== Personnel ==
Texas

- Sharleen Spiteri – vocals, guitar
- Stuart Kerr – vocals, drums
- Johnny McElhone – bass
- Ally McErlaine – guitar

Other Personnel

- Tim Palmer – producer/audio mixer
