= White on Blonde =

Studio album by Texas
- Released: 3 February 1997
- Recorded: 1994–1996
- Studios: Chateau de la Rouge Motte (Normandy, France), The Church, Abbey Road (London, England), Love Net, Shar's House, Park Lane (Glasgow, Scotland)
- Genres: Pop rock; alternative rock; downtempo; blue-eyed soul; trip hop
- Length: 47:06
- Label: Mercury
- Producers: Texas; Mike Hedges; Dave Stewart; Rae & Christian

Texas chronology
| Ricks Road (1993) | White on Blonde (1997) | The Hush (1999) |

Alternate cover
- Japanese bonus cover

Singles from White on Blonde
- 1. "Say What You Want" Released: 6 January 1997; 2. "Halo" Released: 7 April 1997; 3. "Black Eyed Boy" Released: 28 July 1997; 4. "Put Your Arms Around Me" Released: 3 November 1997; 5. "Say What You Want (All Day, Every Day)" / "Insane" Released: 9 March 1998

Professional ratings
Review scores
| Source | Rating |
|---|---|
| AllMusic | 4/5 stars |
| The Guardian | 3/5 stars |
| Los Angeles Times | 2/4 stars |

White on Blonde is the fourth studio album by Scottish rock band Texas, released by Mercury Records on 3 February 1997. It became the band's first number one album in their native Scotland as well as in the United Kingdom and would become their biggest seller internationally, selling in excess of four million copies worldwide. A major commercial success for the band, it has been certified 6× Platinum by the British Phonographic Industry (BPI) for shipments of over 1.8 million copies, and has sold 1.65 million copies in the United Kingdom alone as of January 2017.

It spawned the commercial successful singles "Say What You Want", "Halo", "Black Eyed Boy", "Put Your Arms Around Me" and "Insane". "Insane" was released as a Double A-side alongside "Say What You Want (All Day, Every Day)", a remix version of "Say What You Want", and featured Method Man and RZA from the Wu-Tang Clan. At the 2010 BRIT Awards, White on Blonde was nominated for British Album of 30 Years, ultimately losing to (What's the Story) Morning Glory? by Oasis.

== Background and release ==
The writing process for White on Blonde spanned a period of three years, with early writing and recordings commencing during 1994. Described as a "incredibly fruitful time" for the band, together, they had penned a total of twenty-two songs for consideration of the then unnamed album. In the end, the standard international release was brought down to fourteen tracks for inclusion, whereas the Japanese version received sixteen tracks. All but one of the songs on the album were written by band members Sharleen Spiteri and Johnny McElhone, the only exception being "You're All I Need to Get By", originally written by Ashford & Simpson which accompanied the release of "Put Your Arms Around Me". Unlike their previous three albums, each of the band members shared a "considerable share" of the production arrangements for White on Blonde.

The album includes five UK Top Ten singles: "Say What You Want" (UK No. 3), "Halo" (UK No. 10), "Black Eyed Boy" (UK No. 5), "Put Your Arms Around Me" (UK No. 10) and "Insane" (UK No. 4), the latter released as a double A-sided single with "Say What You Want (All Day, Every Day)", a new version of the 1997 hit featuring additional rap vocals by the Wu-Tang Clan. White on Blonde has been certified 6× Platinum in the UK, which indicates sales of over 1.8 million copies in that territory. The album was also a major success in various European countries, such as France where it peaked at #2 on the French Album Charts. The album was produced by the band themselves, along with Mike Hedges and former Eurythmics star Dave Stewart.

Spiteri told Q magazine in 1997 following the albums release and success that she felt "it's our time now", further commenting "When our first album, Southside came out, the record company said, ‘She’s the girl, let’s plaster her face everywhere.’ I wasn’t ready. Now it’s not their decision, and I am ready. We all knew we couldn’t just go to the studio and say ‘Here we go again.’ I never gave up, because I knew we could make a great record".

== Critical reception ==
Following its release in 1997, Andy Gill, writing in The Independent, wrote "I've never been able to get much of a handle on Texas, whose style seems to change with each successive album. This time round, singer Sharleen Spiteri has described White on Blonde as a "modern soul record", which isn't too far from the mark, though sometimes the soul equation is a little formulaic - the opening track "Say What You Want" crosses a lyric line from "Sexual Healing" with a guitar line from "Tired of Being Alone" without quite emulating either. Later on, the band's Supremes impression on "Black Eyed Boy" is correct in every detail, right down to the tambourine accenting the Motown beat. The more chances Texas take, the more effective they are. On the dark, moody "Insane" and "Put Your Arms Around Me", looming strings are carried on a slowed-down breakbeat, and on "Good Advice", production duo Rae & Christian put the classic Barry White style to new use".

In 2022, some years after the albums initial release, Quentin Harrison wrote in Albumism "While Texas’ material was always evocative, it was never transportive—until White on Blonde. Instead of clinging to the well-worn roots rock they initially favored, the five-piece pivoted toward a mesmeric blend of French pop, throwback R&B and alternative sonics. The album’s mercurial opener, spiked with a sample of Cole Porter’s 1953 standard “I Love Paris,” was aptly denominated “0.34” for its brief runtime—it set the tone for what was to follow: a rich, melodic aural feast". He further commented on the album, saying "these sounds are enacted with flair and precision, evidence of the rapport Texas has as a unit both within the confines of a recording studio and on a concert stage. From the savory guitar-pop of “Postcard,” to the plush Holland-Dozier-Holland homage of “Black-Eyed Boy,” on over to the one-two power ballad punch of “Halo” and “Put Your Arms Around Me,” Campbell, Hynd, McElhone and McErlaine are stellar musicians in fine form on these cuts and the entirety of the LP".

== Promotion and singles ==
Following an endorsement by then Radio 1 presenter Chris Evans on his Channel 4 show TFI Friday in 1997, Texas came back to the music scene with the international hit "Say What You Want". The song was released internationally on 6 January 1997 and became the band's highest-peaking single to date on the UK Singles Chart, reaching No. 3 in its second week of release.

A total of five singles were taken from the album, all of which were top-ten hits in the UK. "Halo", released in April 1997, peaked at No. 10, "Black Eyed Boy", released in July 1997, peaked at No. 5, and "Put Your Arms Around Me", released in November 1997, also peaked at No. 10. The single version of the latter, known as the Autumn Breeze mix, was featured in the end credits to the 1998 film Ever After. The band then released a double A-sided single of "Insane" along with "Say What You Want (All Day, Every Day)"—a new version of the first hit from the album but now with additional rap vocals from the Wu-Tang Clan. The single peaked at No. 4 in the UK.

== Accolades and legacy ==
White on Blonde has received many honours since its release in 1997. It was voted the 86th greatest album of all time by Q magazine readers in 1998. The album is also ranked #34 in Q's "Best 50 Albums of Q's Lifetime," included in Q magazine's "90 Best Albums of the 1990s," and included in Q magazine's "50 Best Albums of 1997." White on Blonde became the first Texas album to top the UK Album Charts and is one of only two Texas albums (along with The Greatest Hits) to be certified 6× Platinum in the United Kingdom.

In 2010, White on Blonde was nominated in the BRIT Awards Best Album in the past 25 years. On the other hand, White on Blonde was voted the worst Scottish album ever in a 2007 online poll of music fans.

== Commercial performance ==
White on Blonde debuted atop the official Scottish Albums Charts on week 9 February 1997. By November 1997, it was still within the top five of the Scottish Albums Charts. It spent a total of 86 weeks within the Top 100 of the Scottish Albums Charts during its initial run, with a re–appearance in the Top 100 on week ending 18 October 1998 at number ninety-four. It also debuted atop the UK Albums Charts, and reached number one in the United Kingdom again on 23 August 1997. In total, it spent one hundred and twelve weeks in the UK Top 100, one hundred and two within the top seventy-five and forty-two weeks within the UK Top 10. In France, it debuted at number two on the official French Albums Chart, spending a total of fifty-two weeks on the chart.

It achieved similar success in other continental European markets. In Belgium, it reached number eight on the Belgium Albums (Ultratop Flanders) Albums Charts, spending a total of thirty-three weeks on the chart. On the Belgian Albums (Ultratop Wallonia) Charts, it reached number fifteen, and, despite achieving a lower chart position in the Wallonia region of Belgium than it did in the Flanders region, it spent longer on the Wallonia charts, spending a total of forty-eight weeks. In Sweden, it peaked at number twelve, and spent a total of thirty-seven weeks on the Swedish Albums Charts. Elsewhere, it reached a peak of number twenty-five in Switzerland, spending a total of fourteen weeks on the Swiss charts, forty four in Germany, spending eight weeks on the German charts, number seventeen in Norway, spending sixteen weeks on the Norwegian Albums Chart, and spending one week on the Finish Albums Charts following a debut appearance at number thirty-seven.

In Australia, it peaked at number twenty five, and spent a total of four weeks on the Australian Albums Charts, and in New Zealand, it peaked at number thirty-six and also spent four weeks on the albums charts there.

== Track listing ==
| No. | Title | Writer(s) | Producer(s) | Length |
|---|---|---|---|---|
| 1. | "0.34" (Introduction) | Johnny McElhone, Sharleen Spiteri | Texas | 0:34 |
| 2. | "Say What You Want" | McElhone, Spiteri | Texas | 3:53 |
| 3. | "Drawing Crazy Patterns" | McElhone, Spiteri | Texas | 3:52 |
| 4. | "Halo" | McElhone, Spiteri | Texas, Mike Hedges | 4:10 |
| 5. | "Put Your Arms Around Me" | McElhone, Spiteri, Dave Stewart, Robert Hodgens | Dave Stewart, Texas | 4:33 |
| 6. | "Insane" | McElhone, Spiteri | Texas, Hedges | 4:45 |
| 7. | "Black Eyed Boy" | McElhone, Spiteri, Eddie Campbell, Richard Hynd, Hodgens | Texas | 3:10 |
| 8. | "Polo Mint City" | McElhone, Spiteri | Texas | 1:37 |
| 9. | "White on Blonde" | McElhone, Spiteri | Texas | 3:46 |
| 10. | "Postcard" | McElhone, Spiteri | Texas | 4:00 |
| 11. | "0.28" (Interlude) | McElhone, Spiteri | Texas | 0:28 |
| 12. | "Ticket to Lie" | McElhone, Spiteri, Hodgens | Texas | 3:31 |
| 13. | "Good Advice" | McElhone, Spiteri, Mark Rae, Steve Christian | Texas, Rae & Christian | 4:50 |
| 14. | "Breathless" | McElhone, Spiteri | Texas, Hedges | 3:55 |
| 15. | "Sunday Is the Saddest Day" (Japanese bonus track) | | | 4:11 |

Japanese Deluxe Edition bonus tracks
| No. | Title | Writer(s) | Length |
|---|---|---|---|
| 15. | "Say What You Want" (Mary Anne Hobbs acoustic session) |
| 16. | "Halo" (808 mix) |
| 17. | "Black Eyed Boy" (Neo-Northern Bossa Nova mix) | McElhone, Spiteri, Campbell, Hynd, Hodgens |
| 18. | "Sorry" |
| 19. | "Say What You Want" (Rae & Christian mix) |

Interactive Songbook bonus disc
| No. | Title | Length |
|---|---|---|
| 1. | "Say What You Want" (Music video) |
| 2. | "Halo" (Music video) |
| 3. | "Black Eyed Boy" (Music video) |
| 4. | "Put Your Arms Around Me" (Music video) |
| 5. | "Sing Along" |
| 6. | "Riff Guide" |
| 7. | "Chords" |
| 8. | "Three Level Quiz" |

== Personnel ==
Texas

- Sharleen Spiteri – vocals, guitar
- Ally McErlaine – guitar
- Johnny McElhone – bass guitar
- Eddie Campbell – keyboards, vocals
- Richard Hynd – drums

Other Personnel

- Roger Ward – guitar
- Paul Taylor – programming
- Alex Silva – programming, keyboards
- Terry Disley – programming, keyboards
- Martin Greene – string arrangement
- Claire Miles – strings
- Anne Stephenson – strings
- Sally Herbert – strings
- Claire Orsler – strings
- Susan Dench – strings
- Gini Ball – strings
- Chris Pitsillide – strings
- Steven Granville – backing vocals

== Charts ==
=== Weekly charts ===
| Chart (1997) | Peak position |
|---|---|
| Australian Albums (ARIA) | 25 |
| Austrian Albums (Ö3 Austria) | 32 |
| Belgian Albums (Ultratop Flanders) | 8 |
| Belgian Albums (Ultratop Wallonia) | 15 |
| Dutch Albums (Album Top 100) | 21 |
| Finnish Albums (Suomen virallinen lista) | 37 |
| French Albums (SNEP) | 2 |
| German Albums (Offizielle Top 100) | 44 |
| New Zealand Albums (RMNZ) | 36 |
| Norwegian Albums (VG-lista) | 17 |
| Scottish Albums (Official Charts) | 1 |
| Spanish Albums (AFYVE) | 4 |
| Swedish Albums (Sverigetopplistan) | 12 |
| Swiss Albums (Schweizer Hitparade) | 25 |
| UK Albums (Official Charts) | 1 |

=== Year-end charts ===
| Chart (1997) | Position |
|---|---|
| Belgian Albums (Ultratop Flanders) | 46 |
| Belgian Albums (Ultratop Wallonia) | 41 |
| Dutch Albums (Album Top 100) | 94 |
| French Albums (SNEP) | 20 |
| UK Albums (OCC) | 5 |

| Chart (1998) | Position |
|---|---|
| UK Albums (OCC) | 29 |

== Certifications and sales ==
Certifications and sales for White On Blonde
| Region | Certification | Certified units/sales |
|---|---|---|
| Belgium (BRMA) | Gold | 25,000^{*} |
| France (SNEP) | Platinum | 500,000 |
| New Zealand (RMNZ) | Gold | 7,500^{^} |
| Sweden (GLF) | Gold | 40,000^{^} |
| Spain (Promusicae) | Platinum | 200,000 |
| Switzerland (IFPI Switzerland) | Platinum | 50,000^{^} |
| United Kingdom (BPI) | 6× Platinum | 1,652,100 |
Summaries
| Europe (IFPI) | 3× Platinum | 3,000,000^{*} |
| Worldwide | —N/a | 4,000,000 |
^{*} Sales figures based on certification alone.^{^} Shipments figures based on certification alone.
