= I Don't Want a Lover =

1989 single by Texas

Single by Texas

from the album Southside
- B-side: "Believe Me"; "All in Vain"
- Released: January 1989
- Genre: Roots rock
- Length: 5:00
- Label: Mercury; Phonogram
- Songwriters: Johnny McElhone; Sharleen Spiteri
- Producer: Tim Palmer

Texas singles chronology
"I Don't Want a Lover" (1989)	"Thrill Has Gone" (1989)
"Inner Smile" (2001)	"I Don't Want a Lover" (2001 mix) (2001)	"Guitar Song" (2001)

"I Don't Want a Lover" is a song by the Scottish band Texas from their first album, Southside (1989). The music starts with blues slide guitar followed by a throbbing rhythm section before the vocals break in. It was released as the band's debut single in January 1989 and peaked at number eight on the UK singles chart. In the United States, it peaked at number 77 on the Billboard Hot 100 chart in September 1989.

In 2001, Norwegian production team Stargate remixed and re-released the song to promote The Greatest Hits compilation album. Released on 9 July 2001, this version peaked at number 16 on the UK chart.

== Critical reception ==
In an ironic review on 4 February 1989, Phil Cheeseman of British music newspaper Record Mirror chided the song for lack of individuality. He wrote: "Begins brightly with some welcome slide guitar work but even before its slide towards American FM rock you're already scouring the sleeve in a vague attempt to find something, anything of interest".

== Track listings ==
=== Original release ===
7-inch, mini-CD, and cassette single

A. "I Don't Want a Lover"
B. "Believe Me"

CD and 12-inch single

1. "I Don't Want a Lover" (full version)
2. "Believe Me"
3. "All in Vain"

=== 2001 mix ===
UK CD1

1. "I Don't Want a Lover" – 4:15
2. "Superwrong" – 3:58
3. "I Don't Want a Lover" (Stonebridge club remix) – 7:37
4. "I Don't Want a Lover" (video)

UK CD2

1. "I Don't Want a Lover" (live)
2. "Summer Son" (live)
3. "Suspicious Minds" (live)
- All songs were recorded live at the Greatest Hits tour 2001

UK cassette single

1. "I Don't Want a Lover" – 4:15
2. "Summer Son" (live) – 4:16
3. "I Don't Want a Lover" (Trailermen remix) – 4:43

European CD single

1. "I Don't Want a Lover" (2001 mix) – 4:15
2. "Superwrong" – 3:58

European maxi-CD single

1. "I Don't Want a Lover" (2001 mix) – 4:15
2. "Superwrong" – 3:58
3. "Suspicious Minds" (live in Paris, 2001) – 5:03
4. "I Don't Want a Lover" (Stonebridge bed mix) – 7:37

== Personnel ==
Personnel are lifted from The Greatest Hits album booklet and the 2001 UK CD1 liner notes.

- Johnny McElhone – writing, bass
- Sharleen Spiteri – writing, backing vocals, guitars
- Stuart Kerr – backing vocals, drums
- Ally McErlaine – guitars
- Giuliano Gizzi – guitars
- Craig Armstrong – keyboards
- Wix – keyboards
- Mark Feltham – harmonica
- Tim Palmer – production
- Simon Vinestock – engineering
- Stargate – remix, additional production (2001 mix)

== Charts ==
=== Weekly charts ===
Original version

Chart (1989)	Peak position
Australia (ARIA)	4
Austria (Ö3 Austria Top 40)	9
Belgium (Ultratop 50 Flanders)	25
Europe (Eurochart Hot 100)	33
France (SNEP)	11
Ireland (IRMA)	8
Italy Airplay (Music & Media)	5
Netherlands (Dutch Top 40 Tipparade)	2
Netherlands (Single Top 100)	50
New Zealand (Recorded Music NZ)	11
Spain (AFYVE)	20
Switzerland (Schweizer Hitparade)	3
UK Singles (Official Charts)	8
US Billboard Hot 100	77
US Album Rock Tracks (Billboard)	27
US Modern Rock Tracks (Billboard)	11
West Germany (GfK)	18

2001 mix

Chart (2001)	Peak position
Europe (Eurochart Hot 100)	67
Ireland (IRMA)	29
Scotland Singles (Official Charts)	8
UK Singles (Official Charts)	16

=== Year-end charts ===
Chart (1989)	Position
Australia (ARIA)	34
Europe (Eurochart Hot 100)	69
Switzerland (Schweizer Hitparade)	18
UK Singles (OCC)	89
West Germany (Media Control)	94

== Certifications ==
Region	Certification	Certified units/sales
Australia (ARIA)	Gold	35,000^{^}
United Kingdom (BPI)	Silver	200,000^{‡}
^{^} Shipments figures based on certification alone.^{‡} Sales+streaming figures based on certification alone.

== Release history ==
Region	Version	Date	Format(s)	Label(s)	Ref.
United Kingdom	Original	January 1989	7-inch vinyl; 12-inch vinyl; CD	Mercury; Phonogram	
Japan	Original	5 June 1989	Mini-CD	Mercury	
United Kingdom	2001 mix	9 July 2001	CD; cassette	Mercury	
