= Say What You Want =

1997 single by Texas

Single by Texas

from the album White on Blonde
- B-side: "Cold Day Dream"; "Tear It Up"
- Released: 6 January 1997
- Length: 3:53
- Label: Mercury
- Songwriters: Johnny McElhone; Sharleen Spiteri
- Producer: Texas

Texas singles chronology
| "Fade Away" (1994) | "Say What You Want" (1997) | "Halo" (1997) |

Music video
- "Say What You Want" on YouTube

"Say What You Want" is a song by Scottish rock band Texas, written by band members Johnny McElhone and Sharleen Spiteri. It was the first single to be released from the group's fourth studio album, White on Blonde (1997), and released via the band's record label Mercury Records. A commercial success for the band, it has featured on all the bands compilation albums ― The Greatest Hits (2000), I Don't Want a Lover: The Collection (2004), Say What You Want: The Collection (2012), Texas 25 (2015) and The Very Best of 1989–2023 (2023).

== Release ==
Released in January 1997 by Mercury, it is the band's biggest hit commercially, peaking at number three on the UK Singles Chart. As of March 2023, the single is certified platinum in the United Kingdom for sales and streams exceeding 600,000 units. The accompanying music video released to promote the single shows lead singer Sharleen Spiteri in a futuristic room.

In 1998, Texas collaborated with Wu-Tang Clan members Method Man and RZA to remix the song as "Say What You Want (All Day, Every Day)". This version features Method Man and RZA on vocals and was released as a single in March 1998, peaking at number four on the UK Singles Chart and reaching the top 10 in Iceland, the Netherlands, and New Zealand. Both versions of the song are included on Texas's 2000 compilation album The Greatest Hits.

== Critical reception ==
Quentin Harrison from Albumism wrote in his retrospective review of the album, that "the bulk of White on Blonde examines the high and lows of modern love as best heard on its lead single 'Say What You Want'." Andy Gill in The Independent opined that it crosses a lyric line from "Sexual Healing" with a guitar line from "Tired of Being Alone" "without quite emulating either." Kevin Courtney in The Irish Times felt it "has a bit of Marvin Gaye going on". Catherine Eade from Music Week noted the "easy-on-the-ear nature" of the song, "with its Marvin Gaye-influenced chorus". David Sinclair from The Times complimented it as "charming".

== Track listings ==
- UK and Australian CD1
1. "Say What You Want" – 3:53
2. "Cold Day Dream" – 4:01
3. "Tear It Up" – 3:23
4. "Say What You Want" (Boilerhouse remix) – 4:19
- UK and Australian CD2
1. "Say What You Want" – 3:53
2. "Say What You Want" (Rae & Christian mix) – 4:50
3. "Good Advice" – 4:50
4. "Say What You Want" (Rae & Christian instrumental mix) – 4:50
- UK cassette single and European CD single
1. "Say What You Want" – 3:53
2. "Cold Day Dream" – 4:01

== Personnel ==
Personnel are lifted from The Greatest Hits album booklet.

- Texas – production, mixing
  - Johnny McElhone – writing, guitars, keyboards, programming
  - Sharleen Spiteri – writing, programming
  - Ally McErlaine – guitars
  - Eddie Campbell – keyboards, programming
  - Richard Hynd – programming
- The Boilerhouse Boys – additional production
- Paul Taylor – additional programming

== Charts ==
=== Weekly charts ===
| Chart (1997) | Peak position |
|---|---|
| Australia (ARIA) | 11 |
| Belgium (Ultratop 50 Flanders) | 47 |
| Belgium (Ultratop 50 Wallonia) | 28 |
| Canada Top Singles (RPM) | 43 |
| Estonia Airplay (Eesti Top 15) | 1 |
| Europe (Eurochart Hot 100) | 20 |
| France (SNEP) | 22 |
| France Airplay (SNEP/IPSOS) | 1 |
| Germany (GfK) | 61 |
| Iceland (Íslenski Listinn Topp 40) | 17 |
| Ireland (IRMA) | 14 |
| Israel (Israeli Singles Chart) | 6 |
| Italy Airplay (Music & Media) | 14 |
| Netherlands (Dutch Top 40) | 31 |
| Netherlands (Single Top 100) | 35 |
| Norway (VG-lista) | 11 |
| Scottish Singles Sales (Official Charts) | 1 |
| Spain (AFYVE) | 3 |
| Sweden (Sverigetopplistan) | 29 |
| Switzerland (Schweizer Hitparade) | 27 |
| UK Singles (Official Charts) | 3 |
| US Adult Top 40 (Billboard) | 23 |
| US CHR/Pop Top 50 (Radio & Records) | 41 |

=== Year-end charts ===
| Chart (1997) | Position |
|---|---|
| Europe (Eurochart Hot 100) | 98 |
| UK Singles (OCC) | 49 |

| Chart (1998) | Position |
|---|---|
| US Adult Top 40 (Billboard) | 98 |

== Certifications and sales ==
| Region | Certification | Certified units/sales |
|---|---|---|
| New Zealand (RMNZ) | Platinum | 30,000^{‡} |
| Spain (Promusicae) | Gold | 30,000^{‡} |
| United Kingdom (BPI) | Platinum | 600,000^{‡} |
^{‡} Sales+streaming figures based on certification alone.

== "Say What You Want (All Day, Every Day)" ==
"Say What You Want (All Day, Every Day)"

Single by Texas featuring the Wu-Tang Clan
- A-side: "Insane"
- B-side: "Polo Mint City"
- Released: 9 March 1998
- Length: 4:06
- Label: Mercury
- Songwriters: Johnny McElhone; Sharleen Spiteri; Clifford Smith; Robert Diggs
- Producer: RZA

Texas singles chronology
| "Put Your Arms Around Me" (1997) | "Say What You Want (All Day, Every Day)" / "Insane" (1998) | "In Our Lifetime" (1999) |

Wu-Tang Clan singles chronology
| "It'z Yourz" (1997) | "Say What You Want (All Day, Every Day)" (1998) | "Reunited" (1998) |

The song was remixed as "Say What You Want (All Day, Every Day)", featuring Method Man and RZA from the Wu-Tang Clan, and re-released as a double A-side with "Insane" on 9 March 1998. This version was also a success, peaking at number four on the UK Singles Chart and reaching number three in New Zealand, becoming the band's highest-charting hit in the latter country. A second music video was created, showing Spiteri in a park.

Regarding this version, Spiteri said in Q magazine, "They're the biggest guys I've ever seen in my life. They're like basketball players. I'd just recorded a vocal, and Chef Raekwon's like, 'Yo! Who's that singing?' And RZA goes, 'It's Girlie' – 'cos they called me Girlie. And Raekwon goes, 'Man, you black!' And I laughed so loud. Method Man's a pussycat."

=== Track listings ===
- UK CD1 (MERCD 499)
1. "Insane" – 4:45
2. "Say What You Want (All Day, Every Day)" – 4:06
3. "Polo Mint City" (full version) – 2:50
4. "Say What You Want (All Day, Every Day)" (Trailermen mix) – 8:38
- UK CD2 (MERDD 499)
1. "Say What You Want (All Day, Every Day)" (extended version) – 5:02
2. "Insane" (The Second Scroll) – 6:33
3. "Say What You Want (All Day, Every Day)" (RZA instrumental) – 5:13
4. "Insane" (The Second Scroll dub) – 6:35
- UK cassette single (MERMC 499)
1. "Say What You Want (All Day, Every Day)" – 4:06
2. "Insane" – 4:45
- European CD single (568 596-2)
1. "Say What You Want (All Day, Every Day)" – 4:06
2. "Insane" (The Second Scroll) – 6:33

=== Personnel ===
Personnel are lifted from The Greatest Hits album booklet.

- Johnny McElhone – writing, keyboards, programming, remix and additional production (as Johnny Mac)
- Sharleen Spiteri – writing, keyboards
- Method Man – writing (as Clifford Smith)
- RZA – writing (as Robert Diggs), keyboards, production, programming
- Ally McErlaine – guitars
- Eddie Campbell – keyboards, programming

=== Charts ===
==== Weekly charts ====
| Chart (1998) | Peak position |
|---|---|
| Belgium (Ultratip Bubbling Under Flanders) | 15 |
| Europe (Eurochart Hot 100) | 34 |
| Iceland (Íslenski Listinn Topp 40) | 2 |
| Ireland (IRMA) with "Insane" | 25 |
| Netherlands (Dutch Top 40) | 5 |
| Netherlands (Single Top 100) | 6 |
| New Zealand (Recorded Music NZ) | 3 |
| Scottish Singles Sales (Official Charts) with "Insane" | 4 |
| Switzerland (Schweizer Hitparade) | 39 |
| UK Singles (Official Charts) with "Insane" | 4 |

==== Year-end charts ====
| Chart (1998) | Position |
|---|---|
| Iceland (Íslenski Listinn Topp 40) | 82 |
| Netherlands (Dutch Top 40) | 23 |
| Netherlands (Single Top 100) | 43 |
| New Zealand (RIANZ) | 36 |
| UK Singles (OCC) | 129 |

== Release history ==
| Region | Version | Date | Format(s) | Label(s) | Ref(s). |
|---|---|---|---|---|---|
| United Kingdom | "Say What You Want" | 6 January 1997 | CD; cassette | Mercury | |
| United States | "Say What You Want" | 7 July 1997 | Modern rock; triple A radio | Mercury | |
| United States | "Say What You Want" | 14–15 July 1997 | Contemporary hit radio | Mercury | |
| United States | "Say What You Want" | 30 July 1997 | College radio | Mercury | |
| United Kingdom | "Say What You Want (All Day, Every Day)" / "Insane" | 9 March 1998 | CD; cassette | Mercury | |
