= Glastonbury Festival 2023 =

Edition of British arts festival

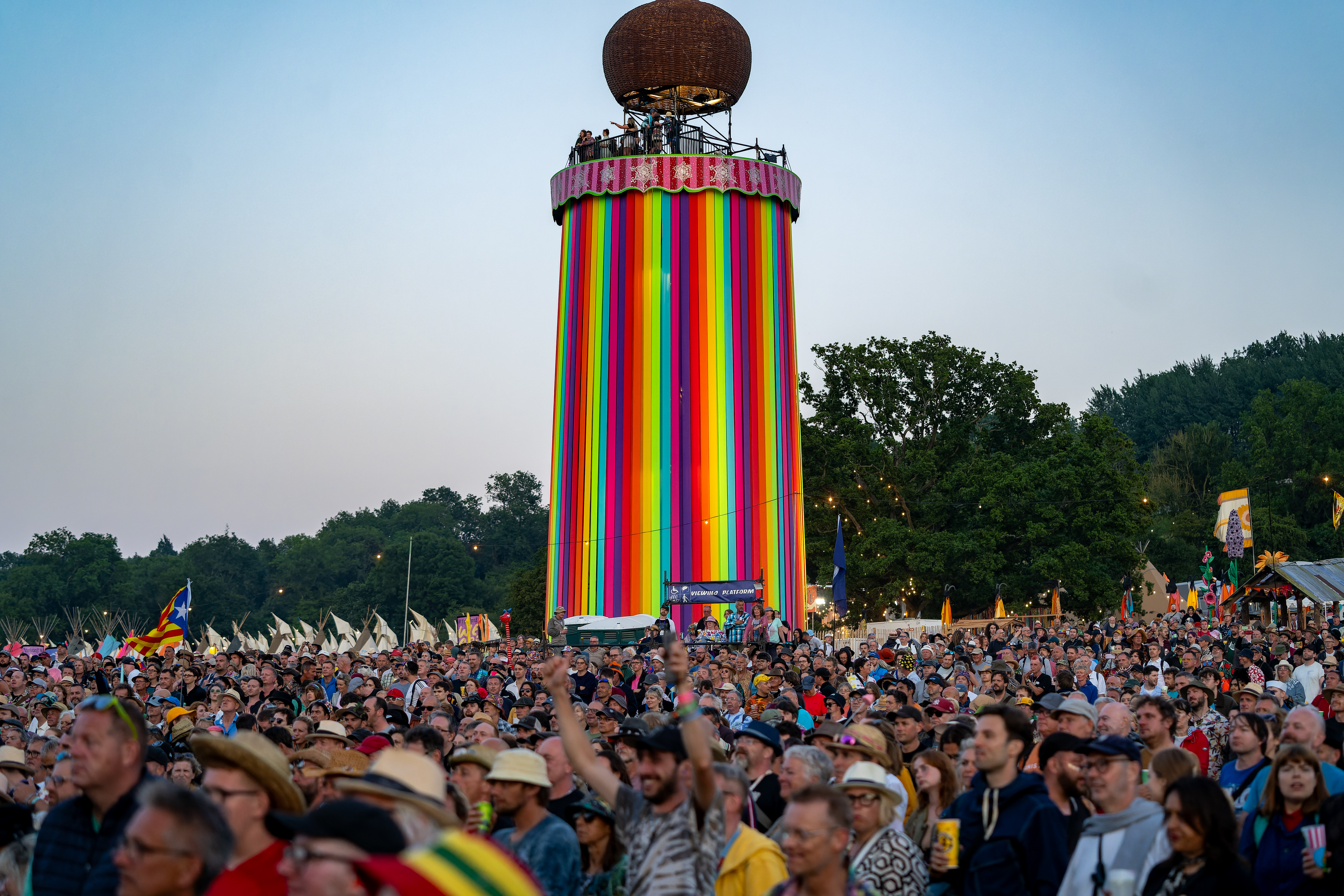
- Date: 21 June 2023 – 25 June 2023
- Locations: Worthy Farm, Pilton, Somerset, England
- Previous event: Glastonbury Festival 2022
- Next event: Glastonbury Festival 2024
- Website: glastonburyfestivals.co.uk

The 2023 Glastonbury Festival of Contemporary Performing Arts took place between 21 and 25 June and followed the 2022 edition of the festival. The three headlining acts were Arctic Monkeys, Guns N' Roses and Elton John, with Yusuf / Cat Stevens performing in the Legends slot.

Over 40 hours of television coverage of the festival was hosted by Jo Whiley, Lauren Laverne, Jack Saunders and Clara Amfo and aired on BBC iPlayer and of the BBC Music and several BBC channels. Over 85 hours of live radio coverage was broadcast on BBC Sounds. For the first time, British Sign Language was included for all Pyramid Stage performances. Several documentaries were released in the lead up to the festival and a selection of highlights from previous years was made available to stream.

== Background ==
Elton John was announced as the festival's Sunday night headliner on 2 December 2022. It is John's first time headlining Glastonbury and his final ever UK show, acting as the last performance of the UK leg of his Farewell Yellow Brick Road Tour. A statement released by Emily Eavis as part of the announcement read:

It gives me enormous pleasure to let you know that the one and only Elton John will be making his first ever Glastonbury appearance, headlining the Pyramid Stage on the Sunday night next year. This will be the final UK show of Elton's last ever tour, so we will be closing the Festival and marking this huge moment in both of our histories with the mother of all send offs. We are so very happy to finally bring the Rocket Man to Worthy Farm!

The remaining two headliners, Arctic Monkeys, headlining for the third time, and Guns N' Roses, making their Glastonbury debut, were announced on 3 March 2023, alongside an initial slate of artists. Yusuf / Cat Stevens was also revealed as the Legends slot performer, having been personally selected by festival founder Michael Eavis.

On 3 March 2023, it was announced that the John Peel Stage would be renamed to Woodsies after nearly 20 years as part of a push for the stages to be named after the fields they are located in.

== Tickets ==
General admission tickets for the festival cost £285 for the full weekend and were sold out.

== Line-up ==
The full line-up, with set times, was announced on 30 May 2023.

=== Pyramid stage ===
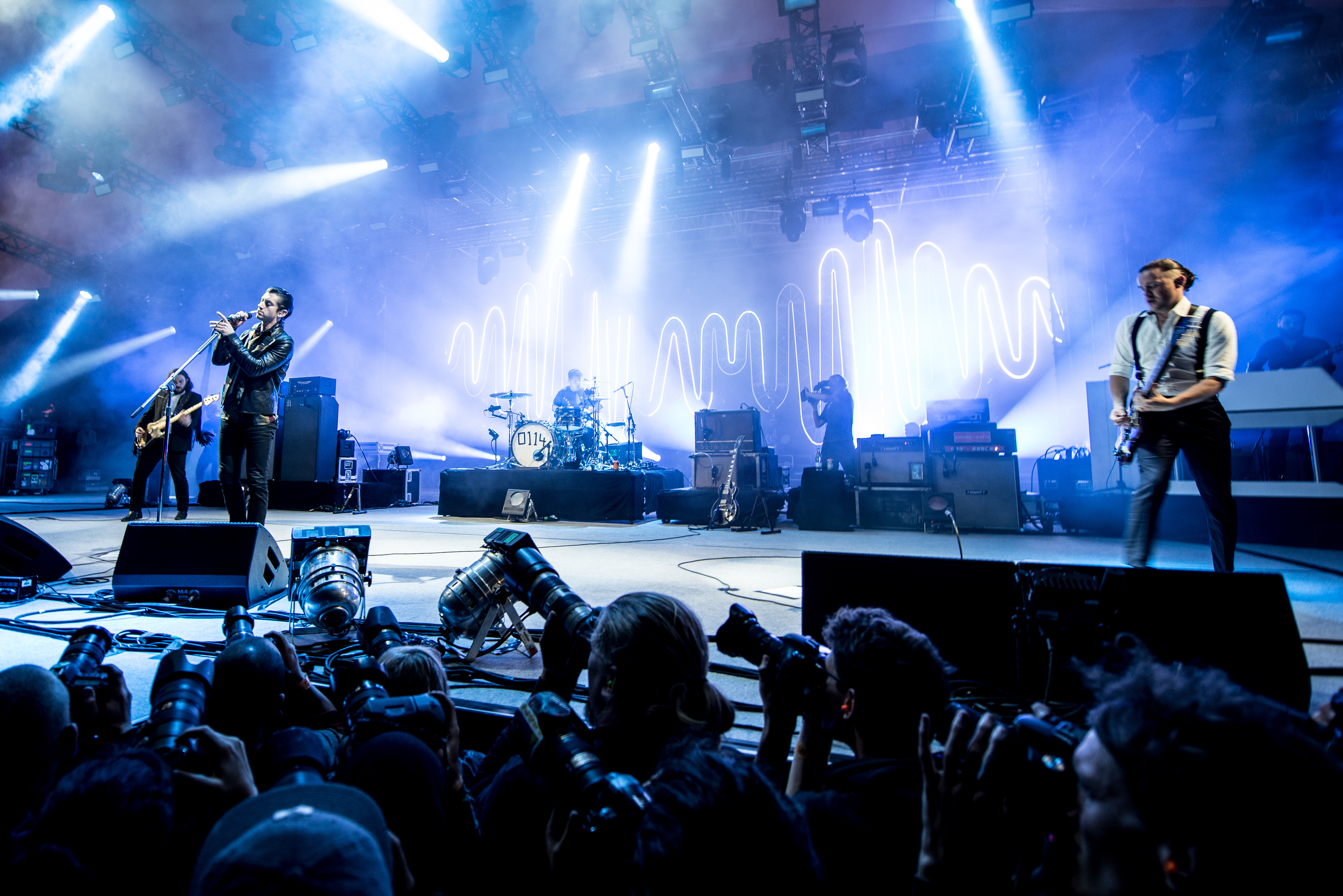
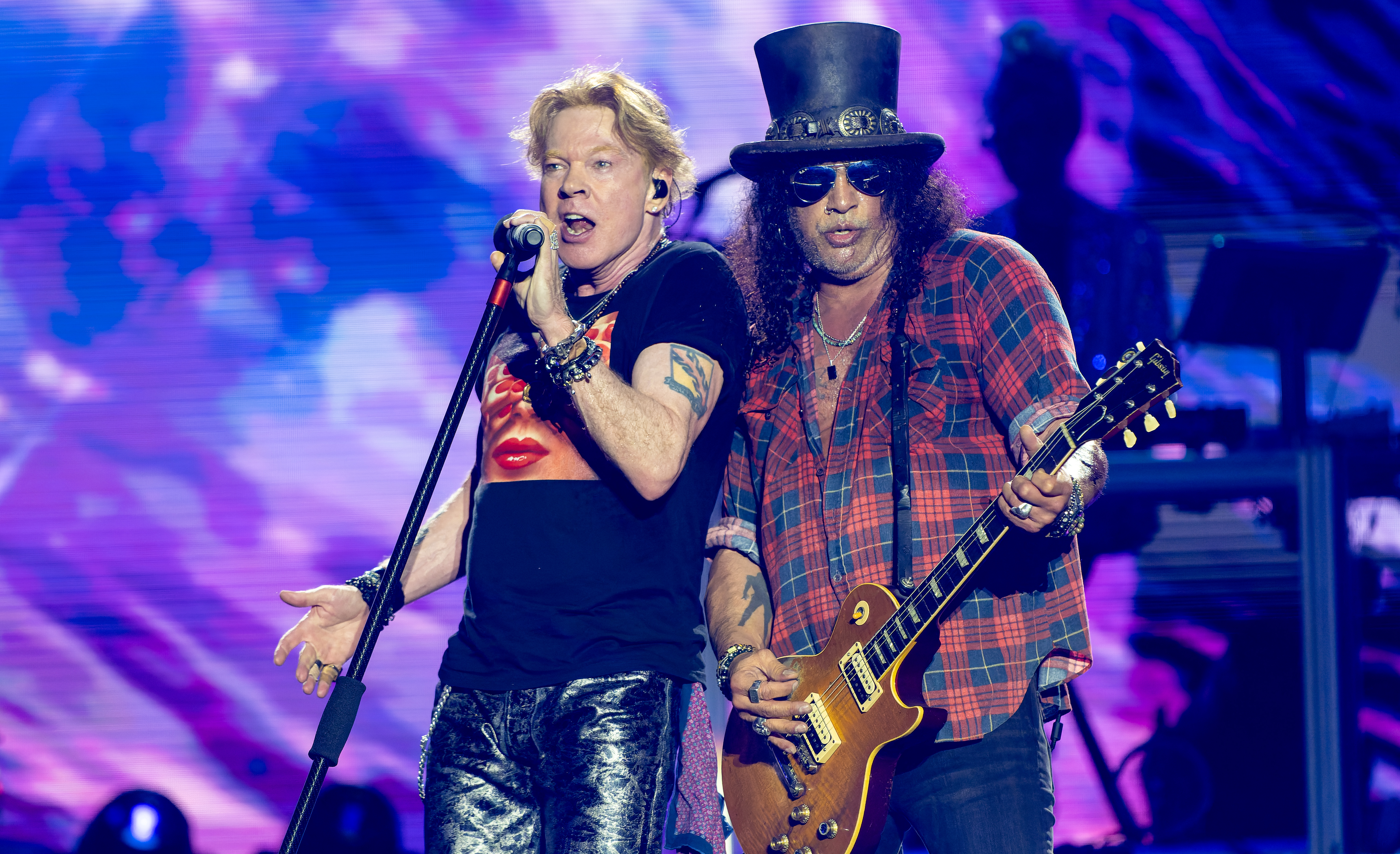
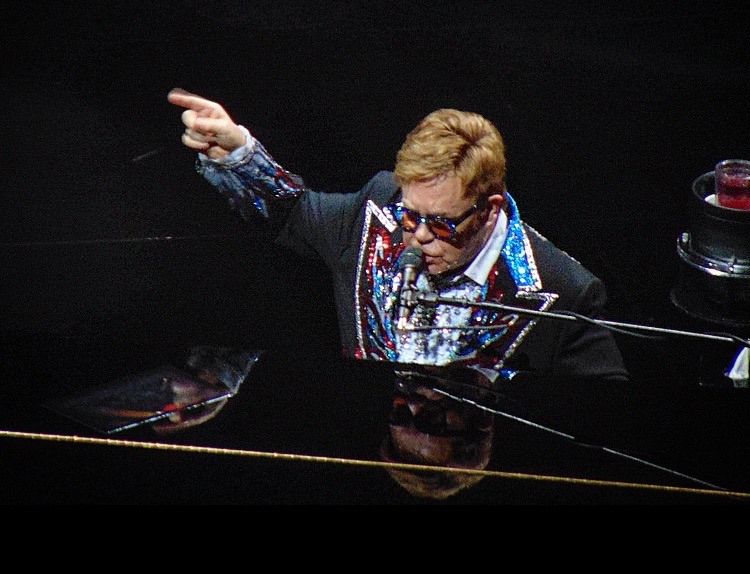
Pyramid Stage headliners Arctic Monkeys, Guns N' Roses and Elton John.

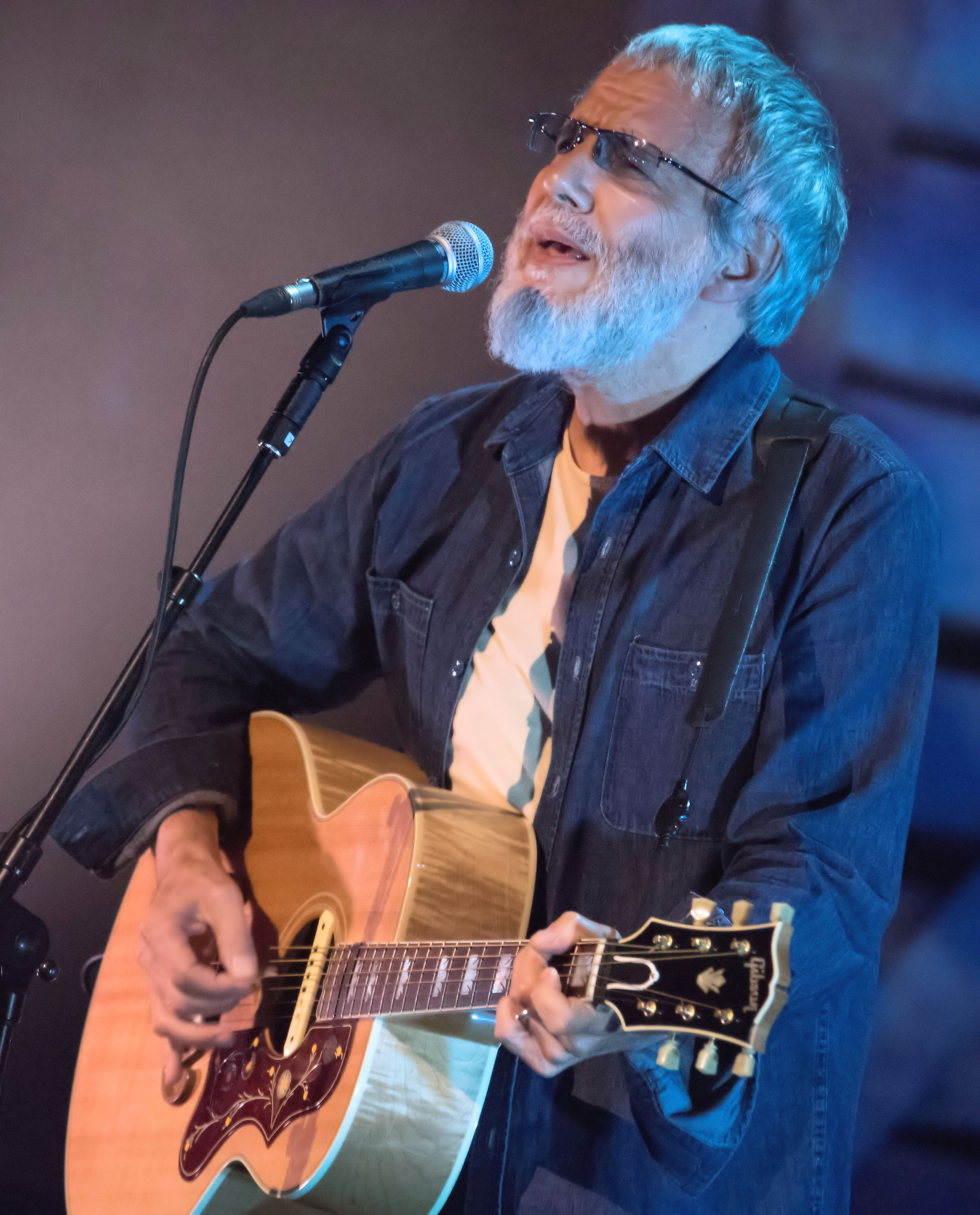
Yusuf / Cat Stevens performed in the iconic "Sunday Legends'" slot.

Friday	Saturday	Sunday
Arctic Monkeys^{[A]} 22:15 – 23:45; Royal Blood; 20:15 – 21:15; Foo Fighters^{[B]} (billed as The Churnups); 18:15 – 19:30; Texas; 16:15–17:15; Stefflon Don; 14:45 – 15:45; Maisie Peters; 13:15–14:15; The Master Musicians of Joujouka; 12:00–12:45	Guns N' Roses^{[C]} 21:30 – 23:45; Lizzo; 19:30 – 20:30; Lewis Capaldi; 17:35 – 18:35; Aitch^{[D]} 16:00 – 17:00; Amadou & Mariam; 14:30 – 15:30; Raye; 13:15–14:00; Rick Astley; 12:00–12:45	Elton John^{[E]} 21:00 – 23:05; Lil Nas X^{[F]} 19:00 – 20:00; Blondie; 17:00 – 18:15; Yusuf / Cat Stevens; 15:15 – 16:30; The Chicks; 13:30 – 14:30; Sophie Ellis-Bextor; 12:15–13:00; Windrush Reggae Choir; 11:00–11:45

A. Arctic Monkeys' set featured James Ford.
B. Foo Fighters' set featured an appearance from Dave Grohl's daughter Violet.
C. Guns N' Roses' set featured an appearance from Dave Grohl.
D. Aitch's set featured an appearance from Anne-Marie.
E. Elton John's set featured appearances from Jacob Lusk, London Community Gospel Choir, Stephen Sanchez, Brandon Flowers and Rina Sawayama.
F. Lil Nas X's set featured an appearance from Jack Harlow.

==== Pyramid Stage Set Lists ====
Maisie Peters

1. Body Better
2. I'm Trying (Not Friends)
3. Love Him I Don't
4. You're Just a Boy (and I'm Kinda the Man)
5. Cate's Brother
6. Not Another Rockstar
7. Worst of You
8. Villain
9. Run
10. You Signed Up for This
11. Brooklyn
12. John Hughes Movie
13. Lost the Breakup
14. Blonde

Stefflon Don

1. Senseless
2. Can't Let You Go
3. Move
4. Clockwork
5. Boasty
6. Bun Fi Fun
7. Daily Duppy
8. Bum Bum Tam Tam
9. Dip
10. Best Friend
11. Move It
12. 16 Shots
13. Hurtin' Me

Texas

1. I Don't Want a Lover
2. Halo
3. In Our Lifetime
4. The Conversation
5. Summer Son
6. Let's Work It Out
7. When We Are Together
8. Black Eyed Boy
9. Inner Smile
10. Say What You Want
11. Suspicious Minds

Foo Fighters

1. All My Life
2. No Son of Mine
3. Learn to Fly
4. Rescued
5. The Pretender
6. My Hero
7. Show Me How
8. Best of You
9. Everlong

Royal Blood

1. Out of the Black
2. Come On Over
3. Boilermaker
4. Lights Out
5. Mountains at Midnight
6. Trouble's Coming
7. Typhoons
8. Loose Change
9. Little Monster
10. How Did We Get So Dark?
11. Ten Tonne Skeleton
12. Figure It Out

Arctic Monkeys

1. Sculptures of Anything Goes
2. Brianstorm
3. Snap Out of It
4. Don't Sit Down 'Cause I've Moved Your Chair
5. Crying Lightning
6. Teddy Picker
7. Cornerstone
8. Why'd You Only Call Me When You're High?
9. Arabella
10. Four Out of Five
11. Pretty Visitors
12. Fluorescent Adolescent
13. Perfect Sense
14. Do I Wanna Know?
15. Mardy Bum
16. There'd Better Be a Mirrorball
17. 505
18. Body Paint
19. I Wanna Be Yours
20. I Bet You Look Good on the Dancefloor
21. R U Mine?

Rick Astley

1. Together Forever
2. Keep Singing
3. As It Was/Take On Me
4. Cry for Help
5. Dipppin' My Feet
6. God Says / Dance
7. Whenever You Need Somebody/Good Times
8. Highway to Hell
9. Never Gonna Give You Up

Raye

1. Oscar Winning Tears
2. The Thrill Is Gone
3. Ice Cream Man
4. Mary Jane
5. Five Star Hotels
6. Worth It
7. Black Mascara
8. You Don't Know Me
9. Escapism

Amadou & Mariam

1. Ta Promesse
2. Batoma
3. C'est Chaud
4. Wily Kataso
5. Masiteladi
6. Yiki Yassa
7. Enaramina
8. Bofou Safou
9. Sabali
10. La Réalité
11. Beaux Dimanches

Aitch

1. Safe to Say
2. Learning Curve
3. Taste (Make It Shake)
4. Strike a Pose
5. Wait
6. Louis Vuitton
7. Take Me Back to London
8. Keisha & Becky
9. UFO
10. Raw
11. Bamba
12. War
13. 1989
14. In Disguise
15. Wonderwall
16. Close to Home
17. My G
18. Fuego
19. Psycho with Anne-Marie
20. Rain
21. Baby

Lewis Capaldi

1. Forget Me
2. Forever
3. Pointless
4. Heavenly Kind of State of Mind
5. Before You Go/Dancing Queen
6. Bruises
7. Wish You the Best
8. Hold Me While You Wait
9. Someone You Loved

Lizzo

1. Cuz I Love You
2. Juice
3. 2 Be Loved (Am I Ready)
4. Soulmate
5. Phone/Grrrls
6. Boys
7. Tempo
8. Rumors
9. Jerome
10. Special
11. I'm Every Woman/Everybody's Gay
12. Coldplay
13. Truth Hurts
14. I Love You Bitch
15. Good as Hell
16. About Damn Time

Guns N' Roses

1. It's So Easy
2. Bad Obsession
3. Chinese Democracy
4. Slither
5. Welcome to the Jungle
6. Mr. Brownstone
7. Pretty Tied Up
8. Double Talkin' Jive
9. Estranged
10. Live and Let Die
11. Reckless Life
12. T.V. Eye
13. Down on the Farm
14. Rocket Queen
15. Absurd
16. Civil War
17. You Could Be Mine
18. Sweet Child o' Mine
19. November Rain
20. Patience
21. Hard Skool
22. Knockin' on Heaven's Door
23. Nightrain
24. Paradise City with Dave Grohl

Sophie Ellis-Bextor

1. Take Me Home
2. Hypnotized
3. Young Blood
4. Get Over You
5. Lady (Hear Me Tonight)/Groovejet (If This Ain't Love)/Sing It Back
6. Crying at the Discoteque
7. Like a Prayer
8. Heartbreak (Make Me a Dancer)
9. Murder on the Dancefloor

The Chicks

1. Sin Wagon
2. Gaslighter
3. Ready to Run
4. Landslide
5. Wide Open Spaces
6. Cowboy Take Me Away
7. Tights on My Boat
8. White Trash Wedding
9. Daddy Lessons/Long Time Gone
10. Rainbowland
11. March March
12. Not Ready to Make Nice
13. Goodbye Earl

Yusuf/Cat Stevens

1. The Wind
2. Moonshadow
3. I Love My Dog/Here Comes My Baby
4. The First Cut Is the Deepest
5. Matthew and Son
6. Where Do the Children Play?
7. Oh Very Young
8. Hard Headed Woman
9. Sitting
10. Tea for the Tillerman
11. (Remember the Days of the) Old Schoolyard
12. If You Want to Sing Out, Sing Out
13. Morning Has Broken
14. Take the World Apart
15. Here Comes the Sun
16. Don't Let Me Be Misunderstood
17. Highness
18. Peace Train
19. Pagan Run
20. Wild World
21. Father and Son

Blondie

1. One Way or Another
2. Hanging on the Telephone
3. Call Me
4. Will Anything Happen?
5. Atomic
6. Rapture
7. The Tide Is High
8. Long Time
9. Maria
10. Detroit 442
11. Doom or Destiny
12. Heart of Glass
13. Fun/Denis
14. Dreaming

Lil Nas X

1. Montero (Call Me by Your Name)
2. Scoop
3. Dead Right Now
4. Don't Want It
5. Old Town Road/Pony/Rodeo
6. Sun Goes Down
7. Panini
8. Down Souf Hoes
9. Thats What I Want
10. Lost in the Citadel
11. Industry Baby with Jack Harlow

Elton John

1. Pinball Wizard
2. The Bitch Is Back
3. Bennie and the Jets
4. Daniel
5. Goodbye Yellow Brick Road
6. I Guess That's Why They Call It the Blues
7. Philadelphia Freedom
8. Are You Ready for Love with Jacob Lusk and London Community Gospel Choir
9. Sad Songs (Say So Much) with London Community Gospel Choir
10. Someone Saved My Life Tonight
11. Until I Found You with Stephen Sanchez
12. Can You Feel The Love Tonight
13. Sacrifice
14. Your Song
15. Candle in the Wind
16. Tiny Dancer with Brandon Flowers
17. Don't Go Breaking My Heart with Rina Sawayama
18. Crocodile Rock
19. Saturday Night's Alright for Fighting
20. I'm Still Standing
21. Cold Heart
22. Don't Let the Sun Go Down on Me
23. Rocket Man

=== Other stage ===
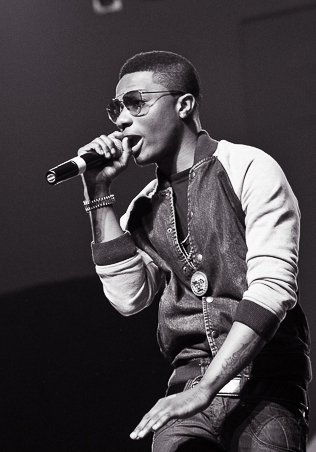
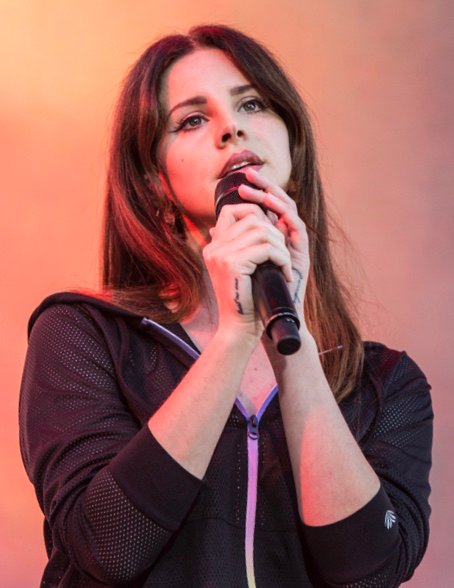
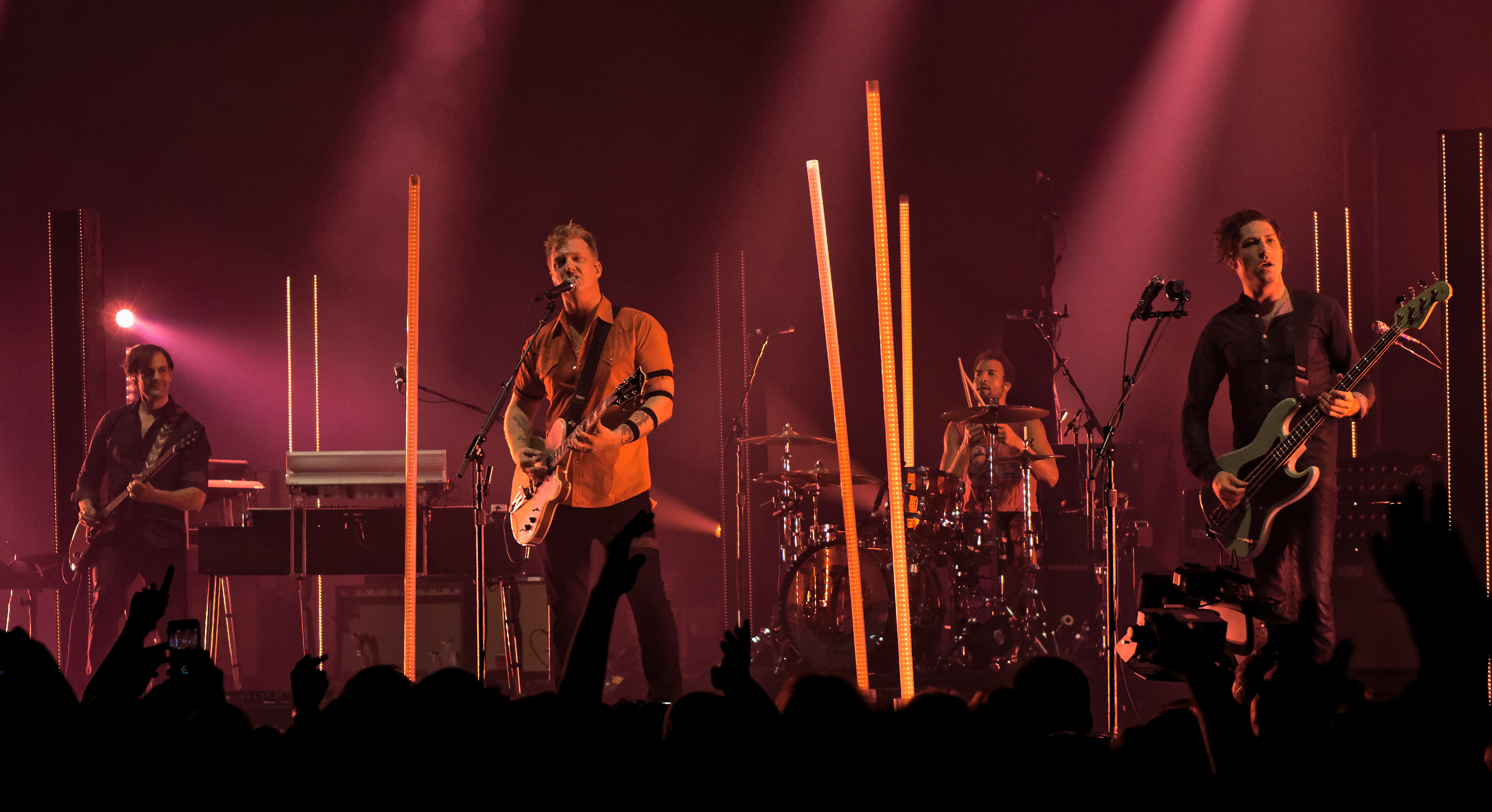
Other Stage headliners Wizkid, Lana Del Rey and Queens of the Stone Age.

Friday	Saturday	Sunday
Wizkid; 22:30 – 23:45; Fred Again; 20:30 – 21:30; Chvrches; 18:45 – 19:45; Krept and Konan; 17:15 – 18:15; Carly Rae Jepsen; 15:45 – 16:45; The Lightning Seeds; 14:15 – 15:15; The Hives; 13:00 – 13:45; Ben Howard; 11:30 – 12:30	Lana Del Rey; 22:30 – 23:30; Central Cee^{[A]} 20:30 – 21:30; Manic Street Preachers; 18:45 – 19:45; Maggie Rogers; 17:15 – 18:15; Generation Sex; 15:45 – 16:45; Tom Grennan; 14:15 – 15:15; The Lathums; 13:00 – 13:45; The Unthanks; 11:45 – 12:30	Queens of the Stone Age; 21:45 – 23:15; The War on Drugs; 19:45 – 20:45; Becky Hill^{[B]} 18:00 – 19:00; Dermot Kennedy; 16:30 – 17:30; The Teskey Brothers; 15:00 – 16:00; Nova Twins; 13:30 – 14:30; Japanese Breakfast; 12:15 – 13:00; The Joy; 11:00 – 11:45

A. Central Cee's set featured an appearance from Dave.
B. Becky Hill's set featured the Heritage Orchestra.

=== West Holts stage ===
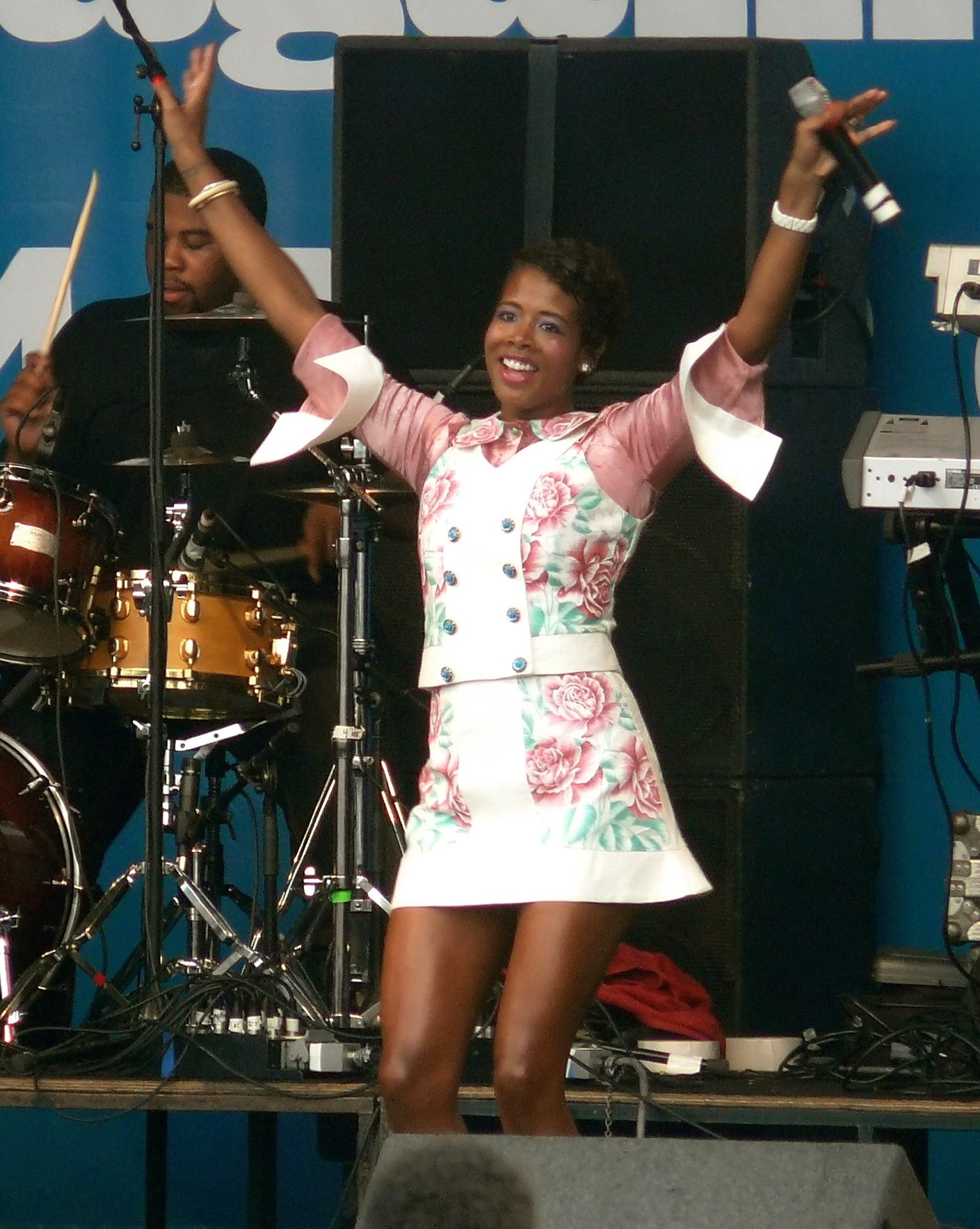
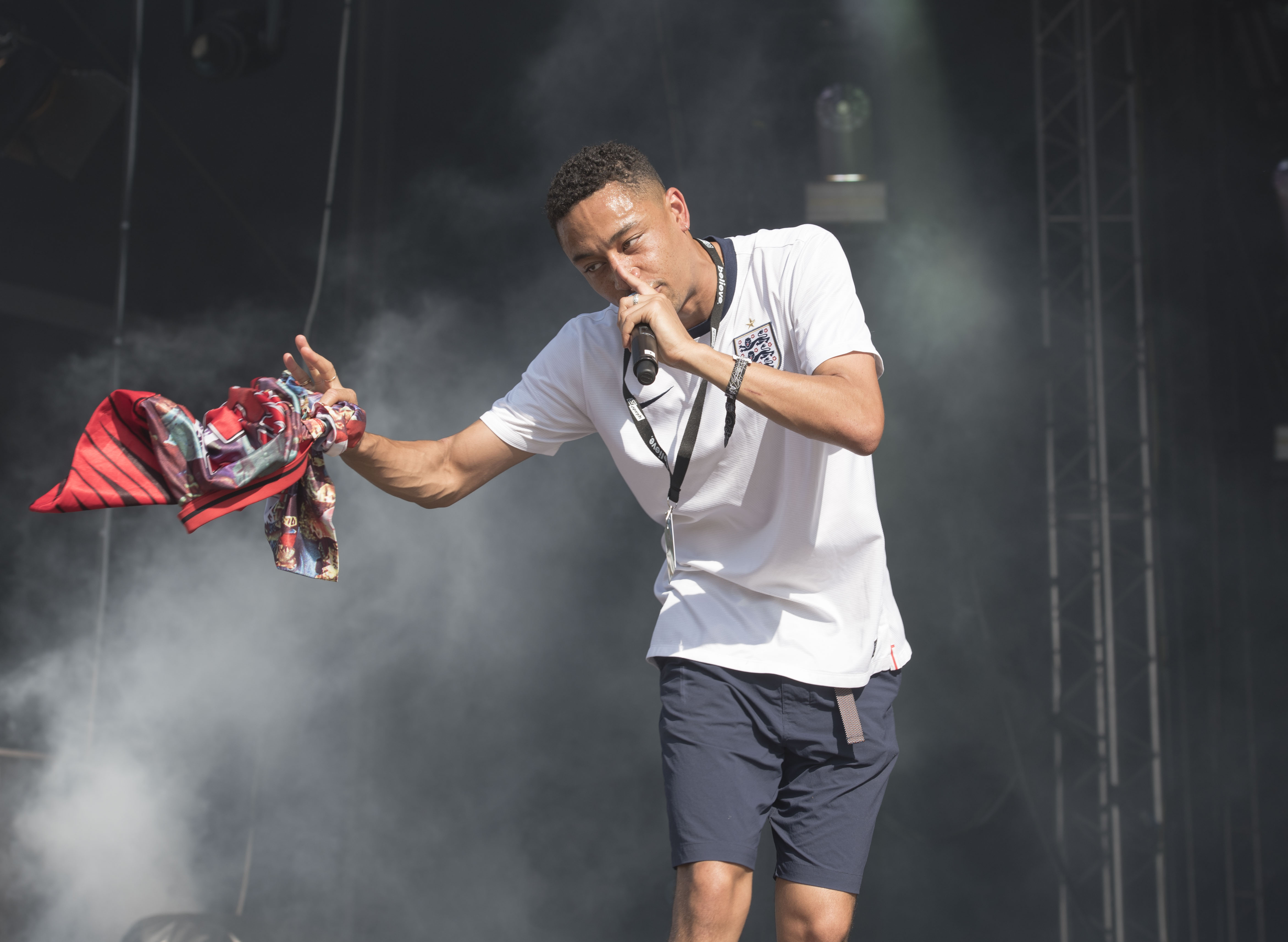
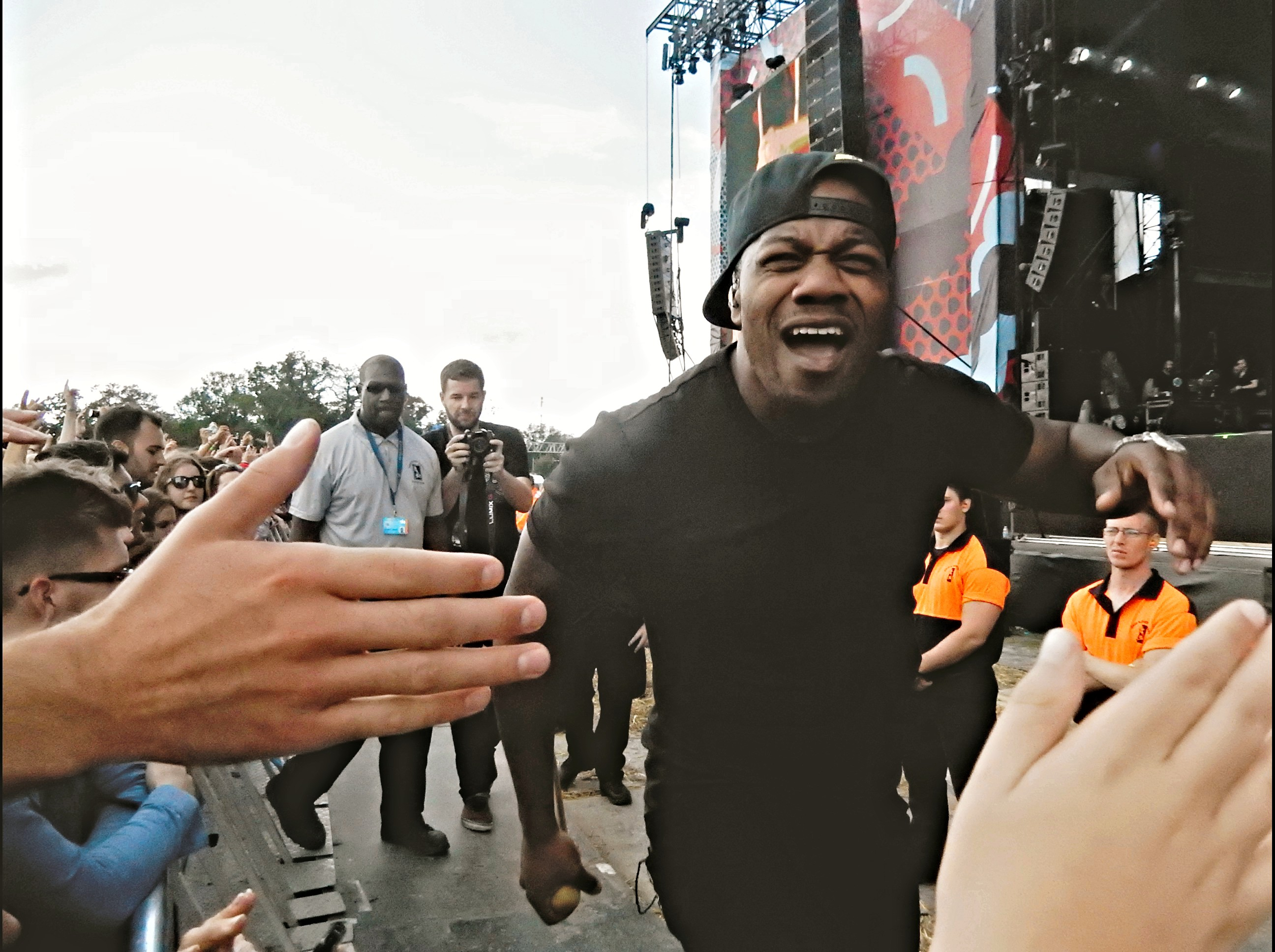
West Holts Stage headliners Kelis, Loyle Carner and Rudimental.

Friday	Saturday	Sunday
Kelis; 22:15 – 23:45; Young Fathers; 20:30 – 21:30; Joey Badass; 19:00 – 20:00; Gabriels^{[A]} 17:30 – 18:30; Louis Cole; 16:00 – 17:00; ADG7; 14:30 – 15:30; Yaya Bey; 13:00 – 14:00; Star Feminine Band; 11:30 – 12:30	Loyle Carner^{[B]} 22:15 – 23:45; Mahalia; 20:30 – 21:30; Ezra Collective; 19:00 – 20:00; Jacob Collier; 17:30 – 18:30; Third World; 16:00 – 17:00; Sudan Archives; 14:30 – 15:30; Kanda Bongo Man; 13:00 – 14:00; Say She She; 11:30 – 12:30	Rudimental^{[C]} 21:45 – 23:15; Candi Staton; 20:00 – 21:00; Barrington Levy; 18:30 – 19:30; The Hu; 17:00 – 18:00; Speakers Corner Quartet^{[D]} 15:30 – 16:30; Black Country, New Road; 14:00 – 15:00; Beth Orton; 12:30 – 13:30; Skinny Pelembe; 11:00 – 12:00

A. Gabriels' set featured an appearance from Celeste.
B. Loyle Carner's set featured an appearance from Olivia Dean.
C. Rudimental's set featured an appearance from Charlotte Plank and Venbee.
D. Speakers Corner Quartet featured Coby Sey, Tirzah, Confucius MC, Joe Armon-Jones, Lea Sen, Kae Tempest, Leilah, James Massiah, Tawiah and Shabaka Hutchings.

=== Woodsies stage ===
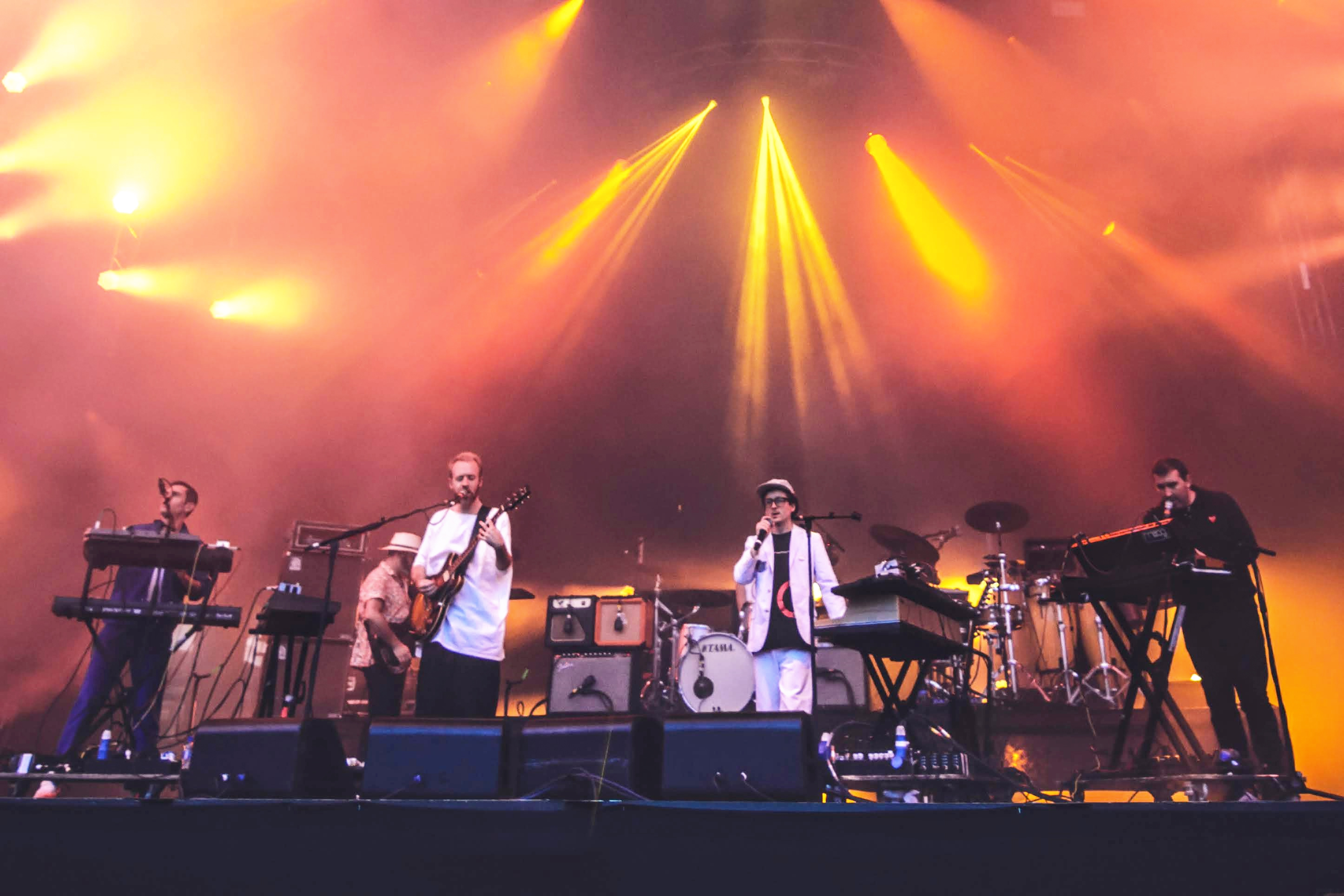
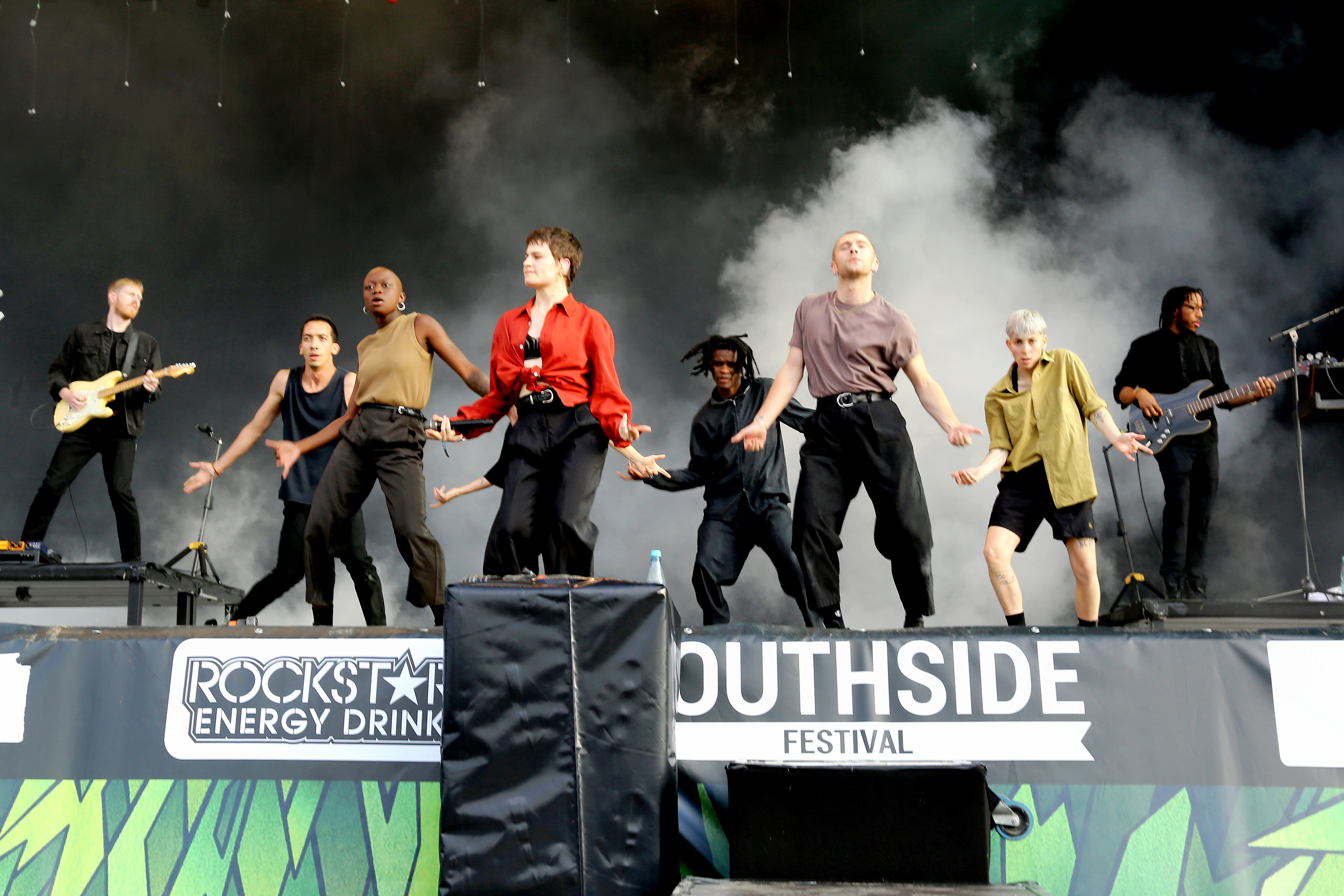
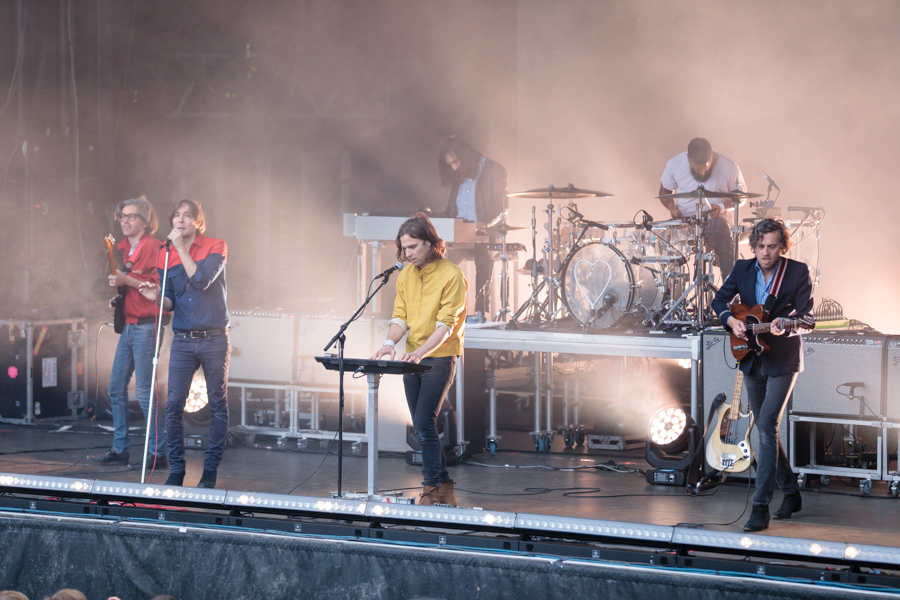
Woodsies Stage headliners Hot Chip, Christine and the Queens and Phoenix.

Friday	Saturday	Sunday
Hot Chip; 22:30 – 23:45; Warpaint; 21:00 – 22:00; Hozier; 19:35 – 20:35; Courteeners; 18:00 – 19:00; Pale Waves; 16:30 – 17:30; Digga D 15:15 – 16:00; Flo; 14:00 – 14:45; Bru-C; 12:45 – 13:30; The Sixsters; 11:30 – 12:15	Christine and the Queens; 22:30 – 23:45; Rina Sawayama; 21:00 – 22:00; Måneskin; 19:30 – 20:30; Blossoms & Rick Astley perform The Smiths; 18:00 – 19:00; Shame; 16:30 – 17:30; The Murder Capital; 15:15 – 16:00; Working Men's Club; 14:00 – 14:45; Wunderhorse; 12:45 – 13:30; The Last Dinner Party; 11:30 – 12:15	Phoenix; 21:30 – 22:45; Caroline Polachek^{[A]} 20:00 – 21:00; Editors; 18:30 – 19:30; Slowdive; 17:00 – 18:00; Cat Burns; 15:30 – 16:30; The Big Moon; 14:00 – 15:00; CMAT; 12:30 – 13:30; The Love Buzz; 11:15 – 12:00

A. Caroline Polachek's set featured appearances from Brìghde Chaimbeul and Weyes Blood.

=== Park stage ===
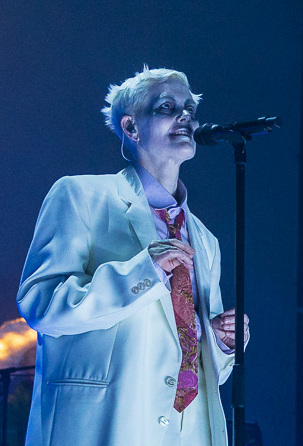
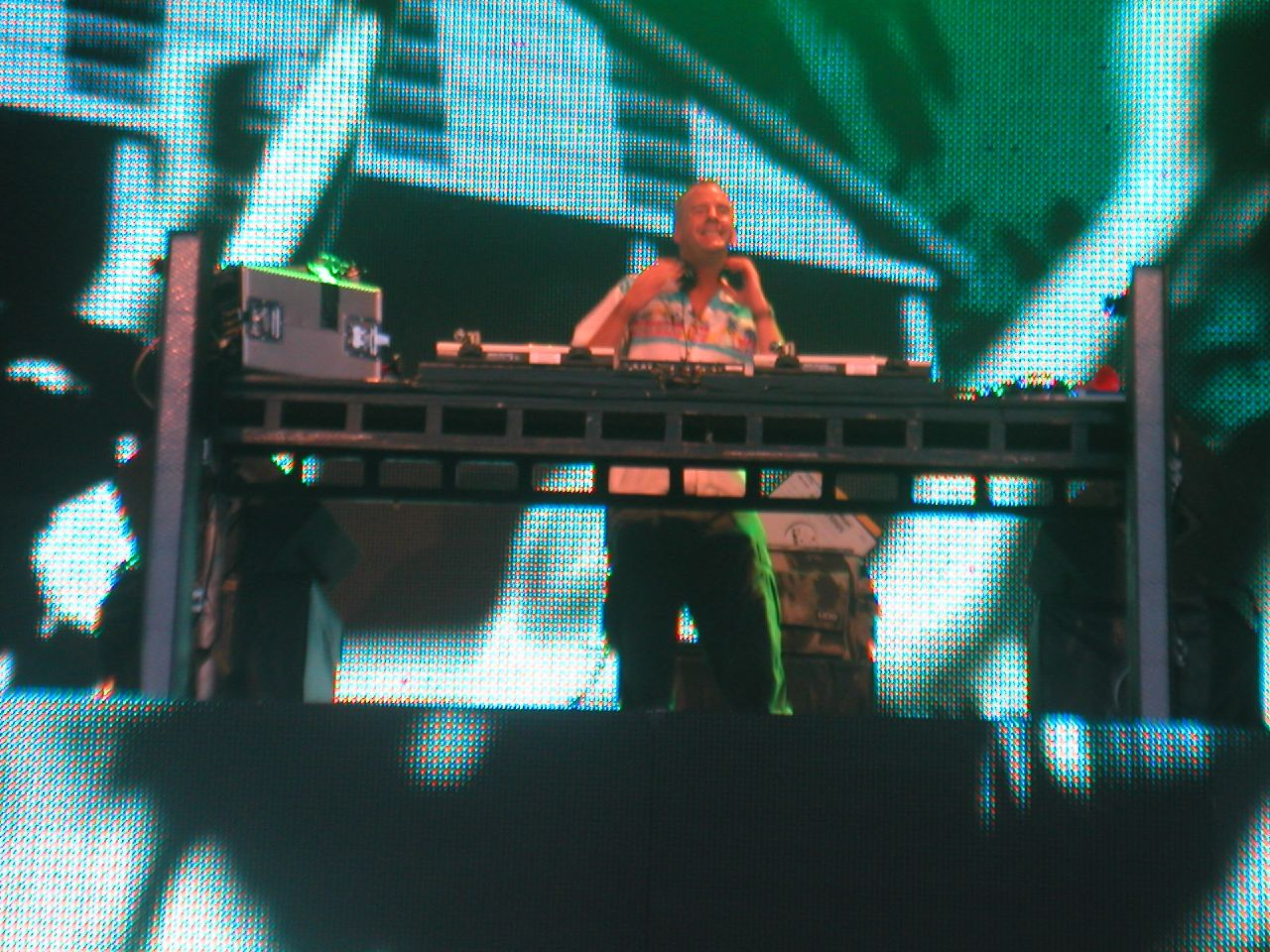
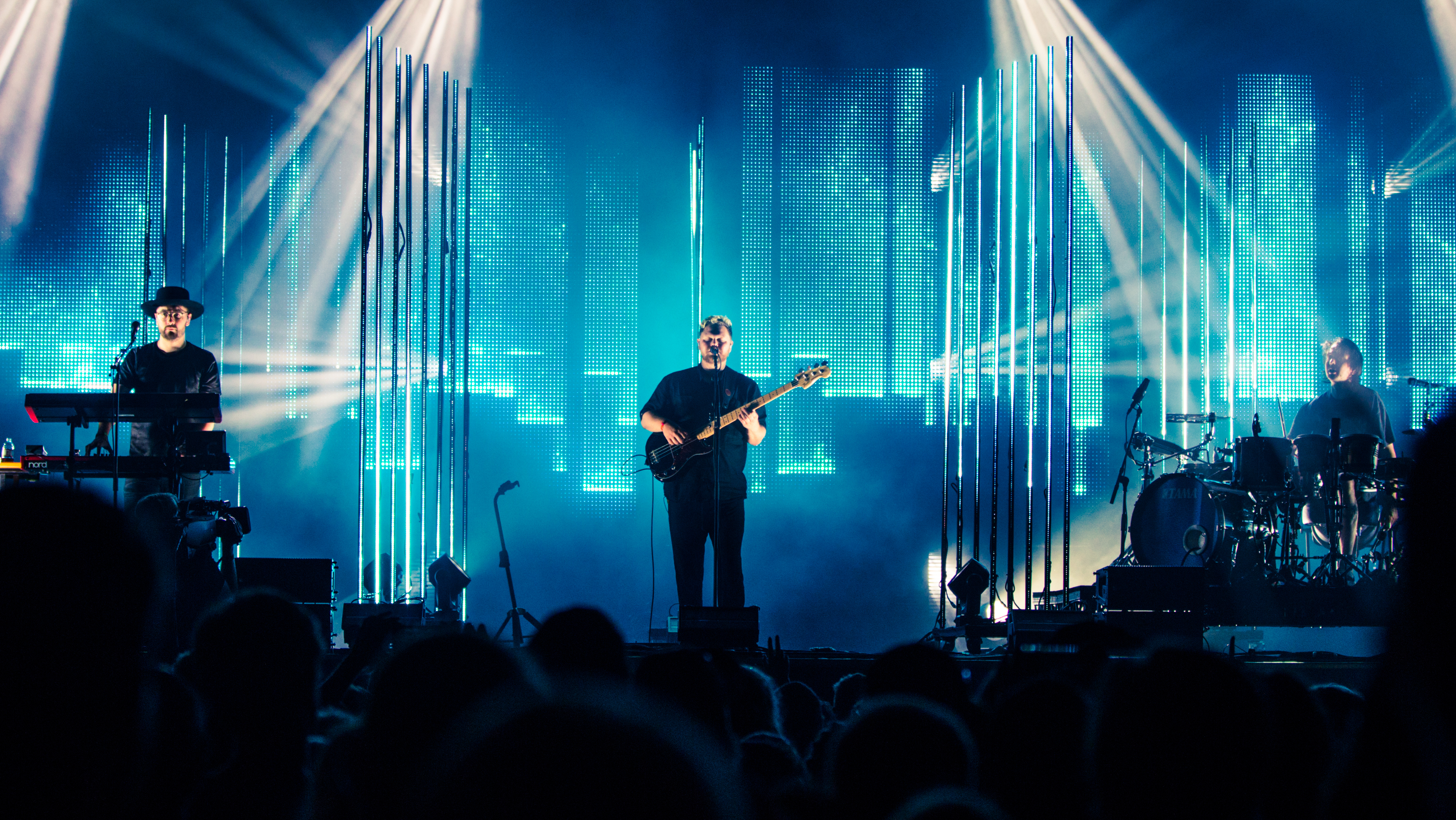
Park Stage headliners Fever Ray, Fatboy Slim and Alt-J.

Friday	Saturday	Sunday
Fever Ray; 23:00 – 00:15; Sparks^{[A]} 21:15 – 22:15; Shygirl; 19:45 – 20:45; The Comet Is Coming; 18:15 – 19:15; Unknown Mortal Orchestra; 16:45 – 17:45; Billy Nomates; 15:15 – 16:15; Los Bitchos; 14:00 – 14:45; Alabaster DePlume; 12:45 – 13:30; Adwaith; 11:30 – 12:10	Fatboy Slim^{[B]} 23:00 – 00:15; Leftfield; 21:15 – 22:15; The Pretenders^{[C]} 19:45 – 20:45; Tinariwen; 18:15 – 19:15; Obongjayar; 16:45 – 17:45; Jockstrap; 15:15 – 16:15; Flohio; 14:00 – 14:45; James Ellis Ford; 12:45 – 13:30; Max Richter; 11:30 – 12:10	Alt-J; 21:15 – 22:30; Thundercat; 19:45 – 20:45; Alison Goldfrapp; 18:15 – 19:15; Viagra Boys; 16:30 – 17:30; Weyes Blood; 15:15 – 16:00; Charlotte Adigéry & Bolis Pupul; 14:00 – 14:45; Gwenno Saunders; 12:45 – 13:30; John Francis Flynn; 11:30 – 12:15

A. Sparks' set featured appearances from Cate Blanchett and Edgar Wright.
B. Fatboy Slim's set featured an appearance from Rita Ora.
C. The Pretenders' set featured appearances from Johnny Marr and Dave Grohl.

=== Acoustic stage ===
Friday	Saturday	Sunday
The Saw Doctors; 21:30 – 22:45; Steve Earle; 20:00 – 21:00; Gavin James; 18:30 – 19:30; Newton Faulkner; 17:25 – 18:10; Seth Lakeman; 16:25 – 17:05; The Mary Wallopers; 15:30 – 16:10; Martin Stephenson and the Daintees; 14:30 – 15:10; Sniff 'n' the Tears; 13:40 – 14:20; Allison Russell; 12:45 – 13:25; Al Lewis; 12:00 – 12:30	Paul Carrack; 21:30 – 22:45; Glen Hansard; 20:00 – 21:00; Glenn Tilbrook; 18:30 – 19:30; Richard Thompson; 17:30 – 18:15; Badly Drawn Boy; 16:30 – 17:15; The Sharon Shannon Trio; 15:30 – 16:00; The Magic Numbers; 14:30 – 15:10; Roo Panes; 13:40 – 14:20; Katya; 12:45 – 13:25; Clare Sands; 12:00 – 12:30	Rickie Lee Jones; 21:30 – 22:45; Gilbert O'Sullivan; 20:00 – 21:00; The Bootleg Beatles; 18:30 – 19:30; Laura Cantrell; 17:30 – 18:15; Toyah Willcox & Robert Fripp; 16:30 – 17:15; The Songs of Leonard Cohen; 15:30 – 16:15; Rumer; 14:30 – 15:10; Kathryn Roberts & Sean Lakeman; 13:40 – 14:20; Naomi Kimpenu; 12:45 – 13:25; Angeline Morrison; 12:00 – 12:30

=== Avalon stage ===
Friday	Saturday	Sunday
The Damned; 23:05 – 00:20; Freya Ridings; 21:35 – 22:35; Xavier Rudd; 20:05 – 21:05; Laura Mvula; 18:35 – 19:35; The Lottery Winners; 17:05 – 18:05; Jamie Webster; 15:40 – 16:35; Fanny Lumsden; 14:15 – 15:10; Hobo Jones & The Junkyard Dogs; 13:00 – 13:45	Vintage Trouble; 23:05 – 00:15; Melanie C 21:35 – 22:35; Jake Shears; 20:05 – 21:05; Gabrielle Aplin; 18:25 – 19:40; Fisherman's Friends; 17:05 – 18:05; Joanne Shaw Taylor; 15:35 – 16:35; Beans On Toast; 14:10 – 15:05; Holy Moly & The Crackers; 12:50 – 13:45; Cable Street Collective; 11:30 – 12:20	Neville Staple; 22:50 – 23:50; Mica Paris; 21:20 – 22:20; Lissie; 19:50 – 20:50; Far from Saints; 18:20 – 19:20; Will Young; 16:50 – 17:50; Elvana; 15:20 – 16:20; Cara Dillon; 13:55 – 14:50; Hannah Williams & The Affirmations; 12:35 – 13:30; N'Famady Koutayé; 11:30 – 12:10

=== Left Field ===
Friday	Saturday	Sunday
Billy Bragg; 21:00 – 22:00; Benefits; 19:30 – 20:30; Cassyette; 18:15 – 19:00; DEADLETTER; 17:00 – 17:45	Dréya Mac; 21:00 – 22:00; Kid Kapichi; 19:30 – 20:30; Crawlers; 18:10 – 19:10; Delilah Bon; 17:00 – 17:45; Big Joanie; 16:30 – 17:00	Cavetown; 21:00 – 22:00; Will Varley; 19:15 – 20:15; Lime Garden; 18:00 – 18:45; Tom A. Smith; 17:00 – 17:30
