= Mahogany Sessions =

British YouTube channel

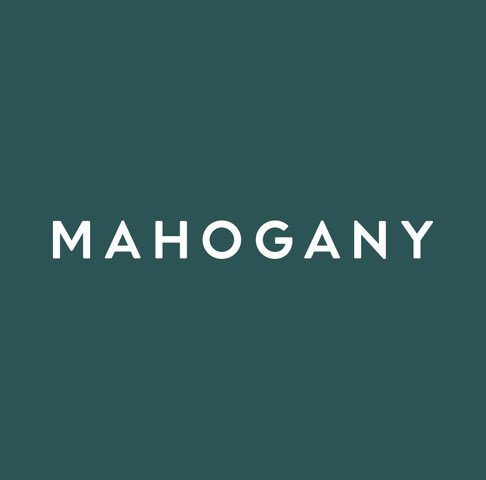
- Industry: Music
- Founded: 2009
- Headquarters: London

YouTube information
- Channel: Mahogany Sessions
- Genre: Music
- Subscribers: 957 thousand
- Views: 276.2 million
- Last updated: 14 July 2022

Mahogany Sessions is a London-based YouTube channel founded in 2009. The channel has hosted performances from artists including Billy Lockett, Rhye, Jack Garrett, Laura Marling and Roo Panes.

== History ==
Mahogany originally started as a WordPress-based music blog in February 2009. ‘The Mahogany Blog’ gained an online following and a year later on 1 July 2010, ‘The Mahogany Sessions’ YouTube channel was launched.

== Partnerships ==
In 2017, Mahogany Sessions partnered with Canon on their EOS C200 camera to film a live session which featured rising UK jazz star Alfa Mist.

In 2017, Mahogany Sessions also partnered with LVMH and Krug Champagne to create a bespoke music and food festival featuring Michelin-star chef Francis Mallman, and live music from Jacob Banks, Ady Suleiman and Jones.

== Mahogany Records ==
In 2017, Mahogany Records was launched, a full service record label that uses the Mahogany platform to gain exposure for new and emerging talent. Signings include London-based KAWALA, electronic act Model Man, Dallas-based singer Abraham Alexander and singer-songwriter Toby Johnson.
