= The Hush =

Studio album by Texas
- Released: 10 May 1999
- Recorded: 1998–1999
- Studio: Shar's House, Park Lane Studios (Glasgow, Scotland)
- Genre: Pop rock; alternative rock; downtempo; blue-eyed soul; trip hop
- Length: 50:40
- Label: Mercury
- Producer: Johnny McElhone (as "Johnny Mac")

Texas chronology
White on Blonde (1997)	The Hush (1999)	The Greatest Hits (2000)

Singles from The Hush
- 1. "In Our Lifetime" Released: 12 April 1999; 2. "Summer Son" Released: 9 August 1999; 3. "When We Are Together" Released: 15 November 1999

The Hush is the fifth album by Scottish rock band Texas. Released in May 1999 as the follow up to their previous studio album released in 1997, the album went onto achieve similar international success than that of its predecessor. It debuted at number one in Scotland and the United Kingdom and spent a total of 43 weeks on the UK Album Chart. It has been certified triple platinum by the British Phonographic Industry. It performed strongly in a number of continental European album charts, reaching the top ten in France, Germany, Switzerland and Sweden.

The album was recorded at both Shar's House, the home recording studio of lead singer Sharleen Spiteri, and Park House Studios, both in Glasgow, Scotland. Its release marked the first time that outside record producers were not involved in the production process of a Texas album. Instead, bassist Johnny McElhone, performing under the name Johnny Mac, assumed sole responsibly for the album's production. Three singles were taken from the album: "In Our Lifetime", "Summer Son" and "When We Are Together".

== Background and recording ==
The album was recorded mostly in singer Sharleen Spiteri's house and was produced by co-songwriter Johnny McElhone. Band member, Johnny McElhone, under the name of Johnny Mac, assumed the lead production duties during the recording of The Hush. The decision to have a band member as the sole producer for the album was a major milestone for the band, as their previous albums had some involvement from outside record producers who were involved at various points throughout the recording of their previous releases. Three co-writers – Robert Hodgens, Mark Rae and Steve Christian – assist lead singer Sharleen Spiteri and McElhone in songwriting duties on the tracks “Tell Me the Answer”, “Summer Son” “Move In” and “The Day Before I Went Away". All other songs on the album were written solely by Spiteri and McElhone.

During the recording of the album, the band were said to be "in an exploratory mood musically", having "shored up the technical aspects of the recording processes". The band described "In Our Lifetime" as "Siouxsie's "Hong Kong Garden" remixed by Prince". Andy Gill of The Independent wrote that "Day After Day" sounded like Diana Ross meeting Massive Attack and "Saint" as "Chrissie Hynde covering a Van Morrison song".

== Release and promotion ==
The album was released internationally on 10 May 1999 via Mercury Records. Released as the lead single of the album, "In Our Lifetime" reached number four on the UK Singles Chart. The other singles, "Summer Son" and "When We Are Together" respectively peaked at numbers five and 12 in the UK. An additional song, "Tell Me the Answer", was released as a promotional single in the United States in November 1999. The Hush has been certified triple platinum by the BPI for UK sales in excess of 900,000 copies. This makes it the band's second most successful studio album after their previous album, White on Blonde (1997), which had been certified 6× Platinum.

Writing in Albumism, Quentin Harrison commented on the album saying "the autumnal pop sprawl favored for White on Blonde is exchanged for a summery amalgamation of R&B, jazz and guitar-pop sounds. Though there had been American and British pop-soul strains underneath Texas’ rock musculature on past endeavors, here Texas pull them forward to operate as the axis of The Hush. There are the elaborate anachronisms of "When We Are Together" and the title track that evoke spirits of The Supremes and Dusty Springfield. The striking album side "Day After Day" is a Thom Bell inspired downtempo number shamefully overlooked for consideration as a single". He further commented, saying "thematically, Texas salutes the incomparable art form of the love song in its various emotional shades of lust ("Summer Son"), joy ("Sunday Afternoon") and melancholy ("Saint"). Spiteri's voice—boundless in its range—sketches vivid aural portraiture on "Tell Me the Answer" and "The Day Before I Went Away", to spotlight just two entries. To call Spiteri a singular talent as a singer would be a vast understatement of her abilities".

== Critical reception ==
Professional ratings
Review scores
Source	Rating
AllMusic	4/5 stars
Entertainment Weekly	B+
The Guardian	3/5 stars
The Independent	4/5 stars
NME	4/10
Pitchfork	4.0/10
Q	4/5 stars
Rolling Stone	3.5/5 stars
The Times	7/10
Uncut	4/5 stars

The Independent wrote a favourable review, describing the song "Summer Son" as "funk motorik with bells Spectorising majestically away". Reviewer Andy Gill stated: "It's almost as if they've set out to make ... a post-modern pop that sums up the entire history of this most varied of 20th-century media. The miracle is that they've just about pulled it off." In a 4 out of 5 star review, Q magazine said: "Production is paramount to The Hush ... but for all the handsome noise, it's Spiteri's ever-widening vocal palette that gives the songs personality. 'Move In' is built upon the muscular funk framework of, say, [Grace Jones's] 'Pull Up to the Bumper', but elevated by a light, hipswaying vocal. In case anyone thinks 'When We Are Together' is standard Motown confection, Texas strip it back to Spiteri and a piano in the middle just to prove how strong it is. For 'Day After Day', she's Dusty Springfield." Reviewer Andrew Collins concluded that the album "is rare pop music that possesses both a collective personality and accumulated wisdom."

Pitchfork wrote: "'Summer Son' bounces along like two-toned buttocks frolicking under a silk skirt, while the title track slowjams erotically like Spiteri rubbing down her body with her eyes closed, lips blooming to reveal marble teeth and a sentient tongue. Well, no. Really, there's more to this 'music' than the singer's looks. Really. Stop looking at that. She's out of our league. Give me that back. I want the artwork!"

== Commercial performance ==
The Hush was regarded as a "repeat success" for Texas, as the follow up to their 1997 international successful fourth studio album White on Blonde. The Hush was a major success for the band, debuting atop the albums charts in both Scotland and the United Kingdom. In the United Kingdom, it spent twelve weeks within the UK Top 10, and a further twenty-seven weeks within the Top 20, forty-three in the Top 40 and fifty-three within the Top 100 as a whole. It continued a similar pattern in continental European albums charts to that of its predecessor, White on Blonde, debuting at number two on the French Albums Charts, and spent fifty-five weeks on the French charts. In Switzerland, it peaked at number five and spent forty-two weeks on the Swiss Albums Charts, and in Germany, it spent thirty-seven weeks on the German Albums Charts following a peak of number seven. On the Austrian Albums Charts, it peaked at number eleven, spending a further nineteen weeks on the Austrian charts.

In the Netherlands, it peaked at number twenty-nine, and went onto spend a total of twenty-two weeks on the Dutch Albums Charts, and in Belgium, it peaked at three on the Flanders Ultratip Albums Charts, spending forty-two weeks on the Flanders charts, and in the Wallonia region of Belgium, it peaked at number nine and went onto spend a total of forty four weeks on the Wallonia Albums Charts. Elsewhere in Europe, it peaked within the top ten in Sweden, charting at number seven on the Swedish Albums Charts and spending a total of twenty-three weeks on the Swedish charts. In Norway, it reached the same position as it did in Sweden, and spent a total of eighteen weeks on the Norwegian Albums Charts. In Australia, however, it peaked at number seventy-five and in New Zealand, it reached number forty-two, and spent a further six weeks on the albums charts in New Zealand.

== Track listing ==
No.	Title	Writer(s)	Producer(s)	Length
1.	"In Our Lifetime"	Johnny McElhone, Sharleen Spiteri	Johnny McElhone	4:06
2.	"Tell Me the Answer"	McElhone, Spiteri, Robert Hodgens	McElhone, The Boilerhouse Boys	3:54
3.	"Summer Son"	McElhone, Spiteri, Eddie Campbell, Hodgens	McElhone	4:04
4.	"Sunday Afternoon"	McElhone, Spiteri	McElhone	4:21
5.	"Move In"	McElhone, Spiteri, Mark Rae, Steve Christian	McElhone, Mark Rae, Steve Christian	4:28
6.	"When We Are Together"	McElhone, Spiteri	McElhone	3:30
7.	"Day After Day"	McElhone, Spiteri	McElhone	4:37
8.	"Zero Zero"	McElhone, Spiteri, Campbell	McElhone	1:42
9.	"Saint"	McElhone, Spiteri	McElhone	4:46
10.	"Girl"	McElhone, Spiteri	McElhone	3:46
11.	"The Hush"	McElhone, Spiteri, Rae, Christian	McElhone, Rae, Christian	4:53
12.	"The Day Before I Went Away"	McElhone, Spiteri	McElhone	6:28
13.	"Let Us Be Thankful" (hidden track)

Japanese bonus tracks
No.	Title	Length
14.	"You'll Never Know"
15.	"In Our Lifetime" (Return to tha Dub mix)

== Personnel ==
Texas

- Sharleen Spiteri
- Johnny McElhone
- Ally McErlaine
- Eddie Campbell

Technical

- Lee Swillingham, Stuart Spalding – art direction, design
- Andy Dockerty, Davie Robertson, Derek Paterson, Fast Eddie, Graham Cochrane, Stevie Marr – crew
- Eddie Campbell, Johnny Mac, Kenny Macdonald, Richard Hynd, Sharleen Spiteri – engineer
- Mark "Spike" Stent – mixing
- Luis Sanchis – photography
- Johnny Mac – production

== Charts ==
=== Weekly charts ===
Weekly chart performance for The Hush
Chart (1999)	Peak position
Australian Albums (ARIA)	75
Austrian Albums (Ö3 Austria)	11
Belgian Albums (Ultratop Flanders)	3
Belgian Albums (Ultratop Wallonia)	9
Dutch Albums (Album Top 100)	29
Finnish Albums (Suomen virallinen lista)	11
French Albums (SNEP)	2
German Albums (Offizielle Top 100)	7
Irish Albums (IRMA)	22
New Zealand Albums (RMNZ)	42
Norwegian Albums (VG-lista)	7
Scottish Albums (OCC)	1
Spanish Albums (AFYVE)	5
Swedish Albums (Sverigetopplistan)	7
Swiss Albums (Schweizer Hitparade)	5
UK Albums (OCC)	1

=== Year-end charts ===
1999 year-end chart performance for The Hush
Chart (1999)	Position
Belgian Albums (Ultratop Flanders)	17
Belgian Albums (Ultratop Wallonia)	19
French Albums (SNEP)	13
German Albums (Offizielle Top 100)	33
Swiss Albums (Schweizer Hitparade)	33
UK Albums (OCC)	11

2000 year-end chart performance for The Hush
Chart (2000)	Position
Belgian Albums (Ultratop Flanders)	100
Belgian Albums (Ultratop Wallonia)	83

== Certifications ==
Region	Certification	Certified units/sales
Belgium (BRMA)	Platinum	50,000^{*}
France (SNEP)	2× Platinum	600,000^{*}
Germany (BVMI)	Gold	250,000^{^}
Norway (IFPI Norway)	Gold	25,000^{*}
Spain (PROMUSICAE)	2× Platinum	200,000^{^}
Sweden (GLF)	Gold	40,000^{^}
Switzerland (IFPI Switzerland)	Platinum	50,000^{^}
United Kingdom (BPI)	3× Platinum	900,000^{^}
Summaries
Europe (IFPI)	2× Platinum	2,000,000^{*}
^{*} Sales figures based on certification alone.^{^} Shipments figures based on certification alone.
