= When We Are Together =

1999 single by Texas

Single by Texas

from the album The Hush
- Released: 15 November 1999
- Studio: Shar's house; Park Lane (Glasgow, Scotland)
- Length: 3:23
- Label: Mercury
- Songwriters: Johnny McElhone; Sharleen Spiteri
- Producer: Johnny Mac

Texas singles chronology
"Summer Son" (1999)	"When We Are Together" (1999)	"In Demand" (2000)

"When We Are Together" is a song by Scottish band Texas from their fifth studio album, The Hush (1999). It was released as the third and final single from the album on 15 November 1999. The song debuted and peaked at No. 12 in the United Kingdom and spent nine weeks on the UK Singles Chart, and it became a top-20 hit in Finland, where it reached No. 17.

== Track listings ==
- UK CD1
1. "When We Are Together" (The Together Mix)
2. "In Our Lifetime" (Live at Barrowlands)
3. "Say What You Want (All Day, Every Day)" (live at the Brits featuring Method Man)
4. "When We Are Together" (the video)
- UK CD2
1. "When We Are Together" (The Together Mix)
2. "When We Are Together" (Jules Club Together Remix)
3. "Summer Son" ("The Euro Bootleg")
- UK cassette single and European CD single
1. "When We Are Together" (The Together Mix)
2. "Say What You Want (All Day, Every Day)" (live at the Brits featuring Method Man)

== Credits and personnel ==
Credits are lifted from The Hush album booklet.

Studios

- Recorded at Shar's house and Park Lane (Glasgow, Scotland)
- Mixed at the Mix Suite, Olympic Studios (London, England)

Personnel

- Texas – all instruments, programming
  - Johnny McElhone – writing, production (as Johnny Mac), string arrangement
  - Sharleen Spiteri – writing
  - Eddie Campbell – string arrangement
  - Ally McErlaine
- Giuliano Gizzi – additional guitar
- Emma Kerr – strings
- Rachel England – strings
- Dervilagh Cooper – strings
- Susan Dance – strings
- Mark "Spike" Stent – mixing

== Charts ==
=== Weekly charts ===
Chart (1999–2000)	Peak position
Belgium (Ultratip Bubbling Under Flanders)	15
Europe (Eurochart Hot 100)	48
Finland (Suomen virallinen lista)	17
Germany (GfK)	71
Netherlands (Single Top 100)	89
Scotland Singles (OCC)	7
UK Singles (OCC)	12

=== Year-end charts ===
Chart (1999)	Position
UK Airplay (Music Week)	45
