= Summer Son =

1999 single by Texas

- Artwork used for most releases

Single by Texas

from the album The Hush
- B-side: "Don't You Want Me" (live)
- Released: 9 August 1999
- Studio: Shar's house, Park Lane (Glasgow, Scotland)
- Genre: Disco; pop
- Length: 4:06
- Label: Mercury
- Songwriters: Johnny McElhone; Sharleen Spiteri; Eddie Campbell; Robert Hodgens
- Producer: Johnny Mac

Texas singles chronology
"In Our Lifetime" (1999)	"Summer Son" (1999)	"When We Are Together" (1999)

Alternative cover
- UK CD2 artwork

Music video
- "Summer Son" on YouTube

"Summer Son" is a song by Scottish band Texas, released as the second single from their fifth studio album, The Hush (1999). The song was released in Europe on 9 August 1999 and in the United Kingdom on 16 August 1999 by Mercury Records, peaking at number five on the UK Singles Chart. In mainland Europe, "Summer Son" became one of the band's biggest hits, reaching the top five in Austria, Finland, France, Germany, Greece, Hungary, Switzerland, and Wallonia. It has received gold certifications in Belgium and Germany and a silver certification in the United Kingdom.

A major chart success for the band, it has appeared on three of their compilation albums: The Greatest Hits (2000), Texas 25 (2015) and The Very Best of 1989–2023 (2023).

== Critical reception ==
J.D. Considine from The Baltimore Sun noted that the band are infusing the song with "an ABBA-esque melancholy." Howard Cohen from The Miami Herald said they do "some Garbage/ABBA melding", picking it as "this CD's catchiest number." Stephen Dalton from NME wrote that "these 12 tracks perform their ear-soothing job with ruthless efficiency", noting the "Abba-tinged retro-disco" of "Summer Son". A reviewer from Sunday Mercury stated that "the new single from Texas, is a great wedge of Scot pop. With its tubular bells chorus, catchy riff and Sharleen's breathy vocals, it's one of the best singles for weeks and deserves to go straight into the top 10." Sunday Tribune complimented its title as "really clever, right, because it's called 'Summer Son', and she's talking about a bloke, but it sounds a bit like 'Summer Sun'". Australian newspaper Sydney Morning Herald deemed it "hugely infectious".

== Music video ==
A music video was made to accompany the song. It features Spiteri writhing with a hunky male model on a bed. The video was banned from daytime TV, as it was deemed too provocative.

== Track listings ==
- UK CD1
1. "Summer Son" (enhanced version)
2. "Don't You Want Me" (live at Glastonbury 99)
3. "Summer Son" (Giorgio Moroder radio mix)

* Enhanced CD includes video and photo gallery

- UK CD2
1. "Summer Son"
2. "Summer Son" (Giorgio Moroder alternative 12-inch)
3. "Summer Son" (Tee's Freeze mix) - 7:30
- UK 12-inch single

A1. "Summer Son" (Sunburn mix) – 7:39
A2. "Summer Son" (Love to Infinity radio mix) – 3:57
B1. "Summer Son" (Giorgio Moroder alternative 12-inch) – 5:14
B2. "Summer Son" (Giorgio Moroder radio mix) – 3:39

- UK cassette single and European CD single
1. "Summer Son" – 4:04
2. "Summer Son" (Giorgio Moroder radio mix) – 3:39
- Australian CD single
1. "Summer Son"
2. "Don't You Want Me" (live at Glastonbury '99)
3. "Summer Son" (Giorgio Moroder alternative 12-inch)
4. "Summer Son" (Love to Infinity Sunburn mix)
5. "Summer Son" (Tee's Freeze mix)
6. "Say What You Want" (live at 2Day FM in Sydney, 28 May 1997)

== Credits and personnel ==
Credits are lifted from The Hush album booklet.

Studios

- Recorded at Shar's house and Park Lane (Glasgow, Scotland)
- Mixed at the Mix Suite, Olympic Studios (London, England)

Personnel

- Texas – all instruments, programming
  - Johnny McElhone – writing, production (as Johnny Mac)
  - Sharleen Spiteri – writing
  - Eddie Campbell – writing
  - Ally McErlaine
- Robert Hodgens – writing
- Tony McGovern – guitars
- Paul Smith – guitars
- Richard Hynd – drums, additional programming
- Mark "Spike" Stent – mixing

== Charts ==
=== Weekly charts ===
1999 weekly chart performance for "Summer Son"
Chart (1999)	Peak position
Australia (ARIA)	95
Austria (Ö3 Austria Top 40)	3
Belgium (Ultratop 50 Flanders)	14
Belgium (Ultratop 50 Wallonia)	4
Croatia International Airplay (HRT)	4
Denmark (IFPI)	10
Europe (Eurochart Hot 100)	6
European Radio Top 50 (Music & Media)	1
Finland (Suomen virallinen lista)	3
France (SNEP)	4
Germany (GfK)	3
Greece (IFPI)	3
Hungary (Mahasz)	4
Iceland (Íslenski Listinn Topp 40)	17
Ireland (IRMA)	18
Italy (Musica e dischi)	39
Netherlands (Single Top 100)	63
Netherlands (Dutch Top 40 Tipparade)	2
Norway (VG-lista)	15
Scottish Singles Sales (Official Charts)	3
Spain (Promusicae)	8
Sweden (Sverigetopplistan)	31
Switzerland (Schweizer Hitparade)	3
UK Singles (Official Charts)	5

2026 weekly chart performance of "Summer Son"
Chart (2026)	Peak position
Poland (Polish Airplay Top 100)	56

=== Year-end charts ===
Year-end chart performance for "Summer Son"
Chart (1999)	Position
Belgium (Ultratop 50 Flanders)	91
Belgium (Ultratop 50 Wallonia)	44
Europe (Eurochart Hot 100)	27
France (SNEP)	42
Germany (Media Control)	36
Romania (Romanian Top 100)	78
Switzerland (Schweizer Hitparade)	28
UK Singles (OCC)	147
UK Airplay (Music Week)	28

== Certifications ==
Certifications for "Summer Son"
Region	Certification	Certified units/sales
Belgium (BRMA)	Gold	25,000^{*}
Germany (BVMI)	Gold	250,000^{^}
United Kingdom (BPI)	Silver	200,000^{‡}
^{*} Sales figures based on certification alone.^{^} Shipments figures based on certification alone.^{‡} Sales+streaming figures based on certification alone.

== Release history ==
Release dates and formats for "Summer Son"
Region	Date	Format(s)	Label(s)	Ref.
Europe	9 August 1999	CD	Mercury	
United Kingdom	16 August 1999	CD; cassette	Mercury	
