= Folila =

Studio album by Amadou & Mariam
- Released: April 10, 2012
- Recorded: Bamako, Mali, New York City
- Genre: Worldbeat
- Length: 43:23
- Label: Nonesuch Records
- Producer: Marc Antoine Moreau

Amadou & Mariam chronology
| Welcome to Mali (2008) | Folila (2012) | La Confusion (2017) |

Folila is the sixth studio album by Mali musicians Amadou & Mariam. The title means "music" in Bambara.

== Recording ==
Folila was originally going to be two separate albums. One album was recorded in New York City and featured contributions from TV on the Radio, Santigold, Nick Zinner, Jake Shears, Theophilus London, members of Antibalas and Bertrand Cantat. A second album, featuring the same set of songs, was recorded in Amadou and Mariam's hometown of Bamako and featured a team of African artists. However, the couple decided to combine the two albums together to create Folila.

== Reception ==
Professional ratings
Review scores
| Source | Rating |
|---|---|
| Allmusic | 4/5 stars |
| BBC Music | (mixed) |
| Drowned in Sound | 7/10 |
| Entertainment Weekly | A− |
| The Observer | 3/5 stars |
| Paste | (8.0/10) |
| Pitchfork Media | 7.4/10 |
| The Telegraph | 5/5 stars |

Folila has received generally positive reviews. On the review aggregate site Metacritic, the album has a score of 71 out of 100, indicating "Generally favorable review."

Thom Jurek of Allmusic gave the album a positive review, writing "Forget prejudices about 'world music'; Folila is great music. Period." Entertainment Weekly's Kyle Anderson also praised the album, writing "Though they sing in different languages, the tongue of teamwork makes for universal understanding [..]" Pitchfork Media's Joe Tangari wrote: "Even if Folila is less surprising than the two albums that came before it, it still makes me look forward to seeing where they'll take this fusion next." Paste's Doug Heselgrave wrote of the guest musicians: "Musical purists may grumble that the only reason listeners first come to this album is because of the many guests that appear on it. But, really, who cares? Amadou & Mariam’s music is strong enough to stand on its own, and it’s a fair bet that people who start with Folila won’t stop listening until they’ve heard all of their albums."

BBC Music's David Katz, on the other hand, was mixed on how the album was assembled, writing "If your tastes are eclectic enough, and if you can get past the factor of contriving, you are bound to love this entire album. But more selective souls may find themselves reaching for the fast-forward button, as perhaps the original plan would have yielded a more cohesive whole." The Observer's Neil Spencer criticized Jake Shears' and Amp Fiddler's contributions, calling them "marginal." Summing up the album, Spencer wrote: "Folila, packed with western friends, mixes the inspired and mundane."

The album was listed at #49 on Rolling Stone's list of the top 50 albums of 2012. Folila was also nominated for a Grammy Award for Best Contemporary World Music Album in 2012.

== Track listing ==
| No. | Title | Writer(s) | Length |
|---|---|---|---|
| 1. | "Dougou Badia" | Doumbia, Santigold | 3:55 |
| 2. | "Wily Kataso" | Adebamfe, Doumbia, Malone | 4:23 |
| 3. | "Oh Amadou" | Bagayoko | 3:30 |
| 4. | "Metemya" | Bagayoko, Moreau, Shears | 3:55 |
| 5. | "Baro" | Bagayoko, Cantat | 3:05 |
| 6. | "Africa mon Afrique" | Bagayoko, Cantat | 3:41 |
| 7. | "C'est pas facile pour les Aigles" | Doumbia, Ebony Bones | 2:41 |
| 8. | "Sans toi" | Bagayoko, Doumbia | 3:18 |
| 9. | "Mogo" | Bagayoko, Cantat | 3:36 |
| 10. | "Bagnale" | Bagayoko, Doumbia, Oumbadougou | 3:30 |
| 11. | "Nebe Miri" | Bagayoko, Doumbia, London | 3:08 |
| 12. | "Chérie" | Doumbia | 4:41 |

== Personnel ==
The following people contributed to Folila:

=== Mariam & Amadou ===
- Amadou Bagayoko - Composer, Guitar, Guitar (Electric), Vocals
- Mariam Doumbia - Composer, Vocals

=== Additional musicians ===
- Yvo Abadi - bass, drums, percussion
- Tunde Adebimpe - composer, vocals
- Victor Axelrod - keyboards, Wurlitzer
- Stuart Bogie - tenor sax
- Bertrand Cantat -composer, doum-doum, guitar, harmonica, vocals
- Tony Cousins - Mastering
- Baubacar Dembélé - Djembe
- Boubacar Dembele - Balafon, Conga, Djembe, Doum-doum
- Vieux Dembélé - Djembe
- Yao Dembele - Bass, Percussion
- Sidiki Diabate - Kora
- Tomani Diabate - Kora
- Ebony Bones - Composer, Vocals
- Amp Fiddler - Keyboards
- Ahmed Fofana - Bass, Flute, Keyboards
- Sanogo Foussn - Doum-doum
- Laurent Griffon - Bass
- Antoine Halet - Collaboration, Engineer, Guitar, Guitar (Acoustic), Mixing
- Bassekou Kouyate - Ngoni
- Christophe Millot - Clarinet (Bass)
- Theophilus London - Composer, Vocals
- Kyp Malone - Composer, Vocals
- Manjul - Percussion
- Jordan McLean - Trumpet
- Santigold - Composer, Vocals
- Jake Shears - Composer, Vocals
- Idrissa Soumaro - Organ, Piano
- Jared Tankel - Sax (Baritone)
- Tanti Kouaté & Her Choir - Choir, Chorus
- Nick Zinner - electric and acoustic guitar
- Abdallah Oumbadougou - composer, vocals

=== Additional personnel ===
- Julien Bescond - A&R
- Josh Grant - Engineer, Mixing
- Kennie Takahashi - Mixing
- Renaud Letang - Mixing
- Marc Antoine Moreau - A&R, Arranger, Composer, Producer
- François Morel - Design
- Thomas Moulin - Assistant
- Benoît Peverelli - Photography

== Charts ==
| Chart (2012) | Peak position |
|---|---|
| US Billboard Top World Albums | 6 |
| US Billboard Top Heatseekers | 24 |
