= Dimanche à Bamako =

Studio album by Amadou & Mariam
- Released: 2 August 2005 (US)
- Genre: African blues, Afrobeat
- Length: 56:43
- Label: Because Music (Europe); Nonesuch Records (US)
- Producer: Manu Chao

Amadou & Mariam chronology
Wati (2003)	Dimanche à Bamako (2005)	Welcome to Mali (2008)

Singles from Dimanche à Bamako
- 1. "Sénégal Fast Food" Released: 2005; 2. "Beaux dimanches" Released: 2005

Dimanche à Bamako (English: Sunday in Bamako) is the fourth album by Malian duo Amadou & Mariam featuring, and produced by, French singer Manu Chao. It was released on the Nonesuch Records label on 2 August 2005.

The album features guests such as Ivorian reggae star Tiken Jah Fakoly and Italian ska/jazz trumpeter Roy Paci.

== Background ==
French singer Manu Chao heard Amadou & Mariam's music on the radio and decided that he wanted to work with them.

== Reception ==
In a review for Allmusic, Chris Nickson gave the album a star rating of 4 out of 5. Joe Tangari of Pitchfork Media gave the album a rating of 8 out of 10 and said that "it would be a crime if it didn't rocket Amadou & Mariam straight to stardom." Spin named the album the 33rd best album released in 2005. Mojo's David Hutcheon gave the album a rating of four stars out of five.

The album won the BBC Awards for World Music Best Album Award 2006 and helped the duo win the African section of the same awards that year. It was also listed as one of Songlines' 10 best world music albums of the year and was nominated for a 2006 Grammy Award for Best Contemporary World Music Album.

Observer Music Monthly listed it as the 39th best album of the 2000s.

== Track listing ==
1. "M'Bifé" (Mariam Doumbia, Manu Chao) — 2:11
2. "M'Bifé Balafon" (Manu Chao) — 1:58
3. "Coulibaly" (Amadou Bagayoko) — 3:18
4. "La Réalité" (Bagayoko) — 3:32
5. "Sénégal Fast Food" (Bagayoko, Chao, Doumbia) — 4:19
6. "Artistiya" (Doumbia) — 3:11
7. "La Fête au Village" (Bagayoko) — 4:11
8. "Camions Sauvages" (Bagayoko, Chao, Doumbia) — 4:08
9. "Beaux Dimanches" (Bagayoko) — 3:31
10. "La Paix" (Bagayoko) — 4:19
11. "Djanfa" (Bagayoko, Chao, Doumbia) — 4:13
12. "Taxi Bamako" (Chao) — 3:44
13. "Politic Amagni" (Bagayoko, Chao, Ousmane Cissé, Tiemoko Traoré) — 4:56
14. "Gnidjougouya" (Doumbia) — 3:45
15. "M'Bifé Blues" (Chao, Doumbia) — 5:21

== Personnel ==
Music

- Nicolas Auriauit — trumpet
- Amadou Bagayoko — guitar, vocals
- Samou Bagayoko — choir
- Manu Chao — guitar, vocals, choir
- Ousmane Cissé — choir
- Boubacar Dembele — djembe
- Mariam Doumbia — vocals, choir
- Roberto Shilling Pollo Duarte — piano
- Tiken Jah Fakoly — vocals
- Laurent Griffon — bass
- Stéphane Hamokrane — choir
- Alain Hatot — clarinet, flute, baritone saxophone
- Pierre Hauthe — trombone
- Renaud Lacoche — saw
- Loïc Landois — harmonica
- Cédric Lesouquet — double bass
- Ibrahim Maalouf — trumpet
- François Regis Matuszenski — keyboards
- Roy Paci — trumpet
- Stephane San Juan — drums, tabla
- Philippe Teboul — percussion
- Tiemoko Traoré — choir

Production

- Philippe Avocat — assistant
- Manu Chao — programming, producer, engineer, editing
- Tony Cousins — mastering
- Antoine Halet — engineer
- Laurent Jaïs — engineer, mixing
- Marc Antoine Moreau — engineer, executive producer, artistic director
- Jean-Loup Morette — assistant

Design

- Marie Laure Dagnaux — photography

== Charts ==
Album

Chart	Peak position
Belgian Albums Chart (Flanders)	70
Belgian Albums Chart (Wallonia)	14
Dutch Albums Chart	93
French Albums Chart	2
Swedish Albums Chart	28
Swiss Albums Chart	39

Singles

Year	Title	Chart peak positions		
Year	Title	BEL	FRA	SWI
2005	"La Réalité"	—	—	73
2005	"Sénégal Fast Food"	30	28	—
2005	"Beaux Dimanches"	—	48	—
"—" denotes a release that did not chart.
