= Amadou & Mariam =

Malian musical duo

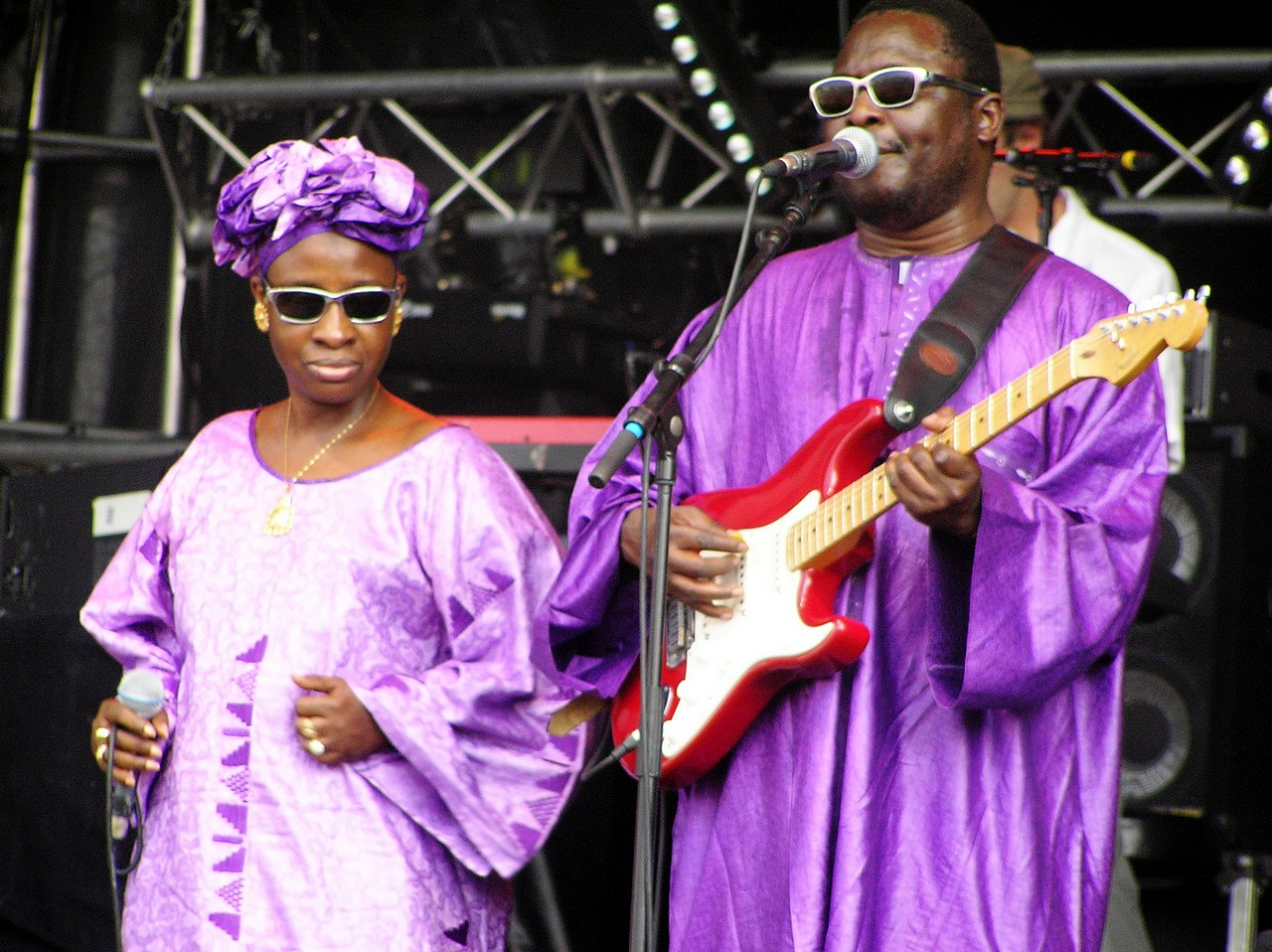
- Mariam Doumbia and Amadou Bagayoko in 2005

Background information
- Origin: Bamako, Mali
- Genres: Malian music; worldbeat
- Years active: 1974–2025
- Labels: Because Music; Nonesuch
- Members: Amadou Bagayoko; Mariam Doumbia
- Website: www.amadou-mariam.com

Amadou & Mariam were a blind musical duo from Mali, composed of Bamako-born Amadou Bagayoko (guitar and vocals) (24 October 1954 – 4 April 2025) and Mariam Doumbia (vocals) (born 15 April 1958). As well as being a musical duo, they were a married couple. After Amadou's death, Mariam continued performing; she put out a posthumous album, and also performed in a duet with Zaho.

Amadou lost his sight at the age of 15; Mariam became blind when she was five years old as a consequence of untreated measles. Known as "the blind couple from Mali", they met at Mali's Institute for the Young Blind, where they both performed in the institute's Eclipse Orchestra, directed by Idrissa Soumaouro, and found they shared an interest in music.

They became known in the early 2000s, particularly to the French public, for the album Dimanche à Bamako. Their album Welcome To Mali (2008) was nominated for the Grammy Award for Best Contemporary World Music Album in 2010. They performed together until Bagayoko died in 2025. Their music was described as "a thrilling mix of blues and rock with traditional African rhythms" and they became "one of Africa's most successful musical exports".

== Style ==
The duo's early recordings in the 1980s and 1990s featured sparse arrangements of guitar and voice. From the late 1990s, Amadou & Mariam produced music that mixed traditional Mali sound with rock guitars, Syrian violins, Cuban trumpets, Egyptian ney, Indian tablas and Dogon percussion, in a mixture that has been called "Afro-Funk".

== Career ==
Bagayoko was born in Bamako, Mali, in 1954. His father was a civil servant. He was born with cataracts on both eyes and was blind by the age of 16. He learned to play flute and harmonica, and when he was invited to join a festival parade with local musicians he realised that music could be a way to overcome his disability. He took up playing the guitar after hearing the music of Jimi Hendrix and James Brown and played in one of Mali's best-known dance bands, Les Ambassadeurs du Motel de Bamako.

He enrolled in the Bamako Institute for Young Blind People (L'Institute des Jeunes Aveugles) to study Braille and in 1976, aged 21, he met Doumbia, four years younger, who had lost her sight at the age of five. At the time, Doumbia was teaching song and choreography to the younger children there. She and Bagayako played in the institute's Éclipse Orchestra, conducted by Idrissa Soumaoro, and discovered that they had similarly eclectic musical tastes. They married in 1980, and began performing together. Doumbia gave birth to 3 children. In 1982 Amadou won the “Discoveries” competition organized by RFI. They formed a band, Mali's Blind Couple, in the 1980s. By 1985, they had made a name for themselves playing Malian blues and embarked on a three-month tour of Burkina Faso. In 1990, they moved to Abidjan in Côte d'Ivoire, recorded several cassette albums and toured around West Africa. During this time, they met Stevie Wonder and started playing at music festivals around the world. In Abidjan, they met Nigerian producer Maïkano and began recording in December 1988. They released two cassette albums, Volume 1 and Volume 2, in March 1989. In February 1990, Amadou and Mariam returned to the studio with producer Maïkano and recorded the tracks that appeared on their cassette albums, Volume 3 and Volume 4, released in 1991.

In 1996, the duo moved to Paris and had a six-month residency playing in an African restaurant. They met a recording company executive and were signed to Polygram's Emarcy label. In 1998 they released their first album recorded outside of Africa, Sou Ni Tile. The track "Je pense à toi" ("I think of you"), a love song that Amadou had written for his wife, was a hit on French radio and the album sold 100,000 copies. In 2003, World–Latin music star Manu Chao produced their 2004 album Dimanche à Bamako ("Sunday in Bamako"), featuring his distinctive vocals. The album won the French equivalent of a Grammy award, Victoires de la Musique, and two BBC Radio 3 Awards for World Music.

In 2005, the Côte d'Ivoire recordings were released for the first time on CD as a limited-edition box set and "best of" collection, 1990–1995: Le Meilleur Des Années Maliennes. Amadou and Mariam won the French Victoire de la Musique prize for best world music album of 2005. After their show at the Olympia in Paris on 26 October 2005, they were awarded a platinum disc by the French Ministry of Culture for sales of 300,000 units of Dimanche à Bamako. They also won two BBC Radio 3 Awards for World Music in the African and Best Album categories for Dimanche à Bamako. In 2006, Bagayoko and Doumbia, together with Herbert Grönemeyer, recorded the official anthem for the 2006 FIFA World Cup, "Celebrate the Day" (German: "Zeit, dass sich was dreht"), and the song topped the German charts in June 2006. They played major festivals in the US, including Coachella and Lollapalooza. On 26 June 2007, they took part in Damon Albarn's "Africa Express" project at the Glastonbury Festival with a line-up including Rachid Taha, K'Naan, Tony Allen, Fat Boy Slim and Tinariwen. This was also their first encounter with Jake Shears of the Scissor Sisters. They supported the Scissor Sisters on their UK tour, which included three nights at London's O2 Arena. In the summer of 2008, they played the Lollapalooza music festival in Chicago, and the Latitude Festival in Henham Park, Suffolk.

In 2008, they released their sixth album, Welcome To Mali, with the participation of K'Naan, Keziah Jones, -M- and Damon Albarn. Their song "Sabali" was placed at no.15 on Pitchfork Media's Top 100 Best Tracks of 2008. It also became the most-played French single worldwide of 2009. In the same year they played on the main stage at the Glastonbury Festival.

On 1 May 2009, Amadou & Mariam won in the 'Best Group' category in the inaugural Songlines Music Awards (2009), a new world music award organised by UK magazine Songlines. On 26 May 2009, they played a gig in support of UK homeless charity Crisis at the Union Chapel, in north London, where they were joined on stage by Pink Floyd guitarist David Gilmour, who played second guitar throughout their 80-minute set. On 8 June, they performed on Late Night with Jimmy Fallon on US TV Channel NBC. That same year, they supported Blur in their two reunion gigs in Hyde Park, London, and also supported UK-based band Coldplay in eight shows on their Viva la Vida Tour. They performed their duo set L'Afrique C'est Chic at The Jazz Cafe in London, and were joined on stage by special guests including Theophilus London, Beth Orton and Krystle Warren. They performed a headline show at the Roundhouse in London as part of the iTunes Festival. In 2009 they became Zeitz Foundation Ambassadors for Culture (Art) and helped to raise awareness and shape activities in their field. They performed live at the 2009 Nobel Peace Prize ceremony.

In 2010, their joint autobiography Away From the Light of Day was published in the UK by Route Publishing. On 11 June, Amadou & Mariam appeared in FIFA's Kick-Off Celebration for 2010's World Cup, hosted in South Africa, alongside Alicia Keys, John Legend, Tinariwen and Shakira, in front of 80,000 people and hundreds of millions of TV viewers. That same year, Amadou & Mariam contributed the song "Tambara" to the Enough Project and Downtown Records' Raise Hope for Congo compilation. Proceeds from the compilation funded efforts for the protection and empowerment of Congo's women, as well as inspiring individuals around the world to raise their voice for peace in Congo. Welcome To Mali was nominated for a Grammy Award for Best Contemporary World Music Album at the 52nd Annual Grammy Awards. They were chosen by Matt Groening to perform at the edition of the All Tomorrow's Parties festival he curated in May 2010 in Minehead, England.

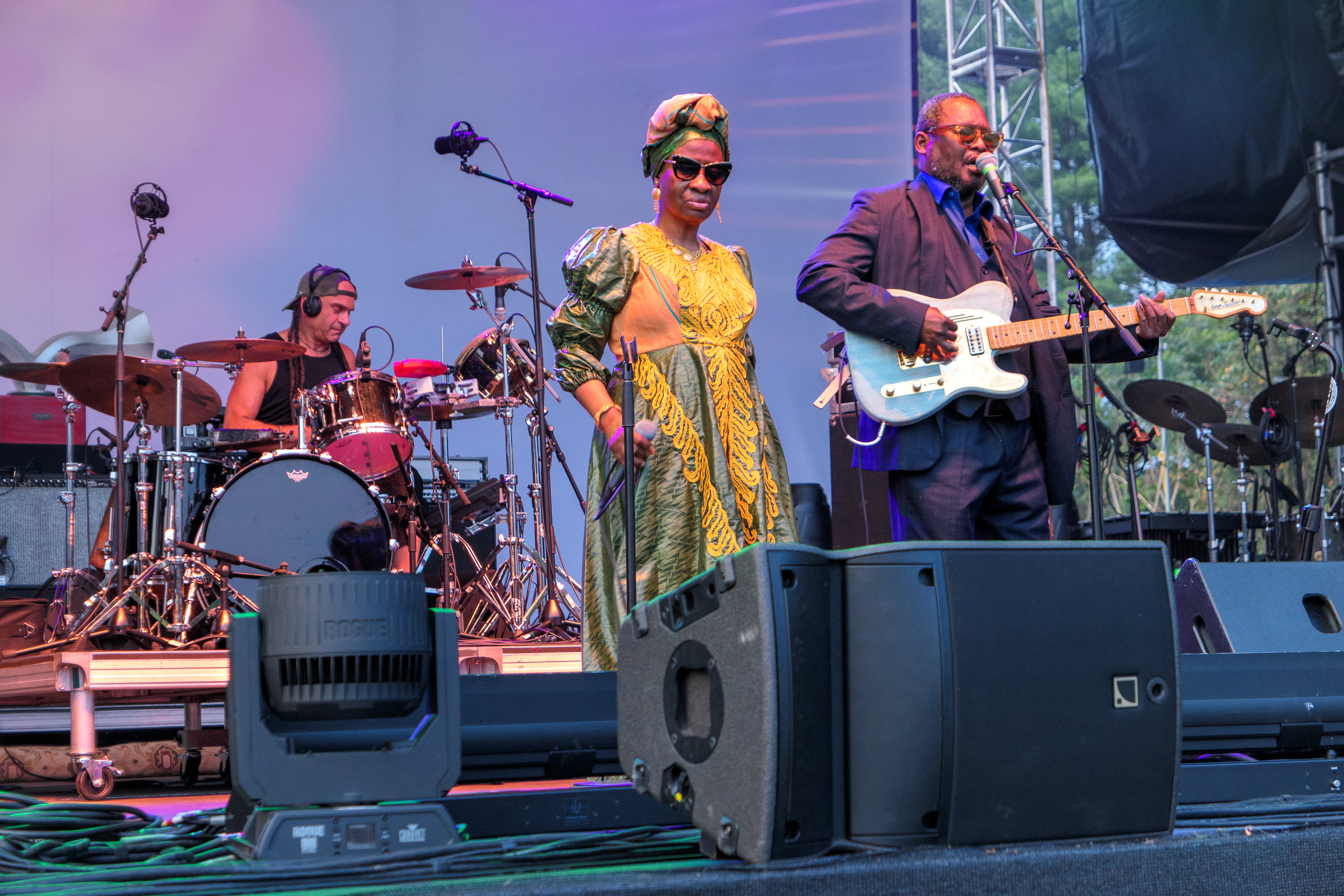
The duo perform in the United States in 2024

In February 2011, Amadou & Mariam performed as one of the support acts for U2 during the Johannesburg and Cape Town legs of their U2 360 Tour. In July, they performed their first concerts in the dark, Eclipse, which were commissioned by the Manchester International Festival. They staged these shows in London in November 2011, and in Paris in January 2012. In 2011, they became ambassadors for the World Food Programme. They travelled to Haïti and offered a new song, "Labendela" ("Children are the Future"), as an anthem.

Their eighth album, Folila, was released on 2 April 2012. Folila ("music" in Bambara) was recorded in Bamako and New York with guest musicians including Santigold, TV on the Radio, and Jake Shears. The first single from the album, "Dougou Badia", was released on 20 January. The track featured a guest appearance by Santigold and was hailed by the NME as a "masterstroke of genre-less genre mixing". For Folila, the idea was for the duo to release each album separately but it was decided to combine the recordings, mixing different takes of the same song in a third studio in Paris. In France, the track "Oh Amadou", a duet with Bertrand Cantat, was chosen as a single. Amadou & Mariam won the Victoires de la Musique award in February 2013 for Folila. On 22 September 2017, they released their album La Confusion, which dealt with events in Mali after invasion by Islamist groups. On 8 September 2024, they performed the Serge Gainsbourg song Je suis venu te dire que je m'en vais at the closing ceremony of the 2024 Summer Paralympics. Amadou and Mariam were scheduled to perform a European tour in summer 2025, including a concert in Vence in the Alpes-Maritimes and concerts in Britain.

Decades after the release of the song "Ko neye mounka allah la," the phrase found its way into modern Afro-pop when producer Sarz and Nigerian artist BNXN sampled its iconic vocal melody in their 2026 comeback anthem, "Back Outside."

Amadou Bagayoko died suddenly in Bamako, Mali, on 4 April 2025, aged 70. Thousands of people gathered at his funeral, which took place in Bamako on 6 April. He was buried in the garden of his house.

== Awards and nominations ==
=== Berlin Music Video Awards ===
The Berlin Music Video Awards is an international festival that promotes the art of music videos.

Year	Nominated work	Award	Result	Ref.
2025	Patience (Sabali)	Best Narrative	Won	

== Discography ==
=== Studio albums ===
Year	Album	Peak positions						
Year	Album	BEL (Fl)	BEL (Wa)	FRA	NED	NOR	SWE	SWI
1998	Se te djon ye	–	–	–	–	–	–	–
1999	Sou Ni Tilé	–	–	61	–	–	–	–
2000	Tje ni mousso	–	–	–	–	–	–	–
2002	Wati	–	–	–	–	–	–	–
2004	Dimanche à Bamako	70	14	2	93	–	28	16
2008	Welcome to Mali	83	73	33	–	–	–	82
2012	Folila	89	80	31	–	32	–	53
2017	La Confusion	–	100	173	–	–	–	–
2025	L'amour à La Folie	–	–	–	–	–	–	–
"—" denotes an album that did not chart or was not released.

=== Compilations ===
- 2005: Je pense à toi: The Best of Amadou & Mariam
- 2006: 1990–1995 Le Meilleur des Années Maliennes
- 2007: Paris Bamako (DVD + CD 12 titres live)
- 2009: The Magic Couple: The Best of Amadou & Mariam 1997–2002

==== Contributing artist ====
- 2010: The Rough Guide To Desert Blues

=== Singles ===
(Selective / charting)

Year	Single	Peak positions				Album
Year	Single	BEL (Fl)	BEL (Wa)	FRA	SWI	Album
1998	"Je pense à toi"	–	–	43	–	Sou Ni Tilé
2005	"Sénégal Fast Food" (featuring Manu Chao)	–	30 (Ultratop)	28	–	Dimanche à Bamako
2005	"Beaux dimanches"	–	–	48	–	Dimanche à Bamako
2012	"Oh Amadou" (featuring Bertrand Cantat)	–	46 (Ultratip)	176	–	Folila
2012	"Sabali"	40	20 (Ultratip)	60	–	Welcome to Mali
2017	"Bofou Safou"	–	–	134	–	La Confusion
2021	"Mon Cheri" (with Sofi Tukker)	–	–	–	–	Wet Tennis
2025	"Patience" (with DJ Snake)	–	–	–	–	Nomad
"—" denotes a recording that did not chart or was not released.
