= Welcome to Mali =

Welcome To Mali

Studio album by Amadou & Mariam
- Released: November 17, 2008 (Europe); March 24, 2009 (US)
- Genres: Pop music African blues Electronic; Worldbeat
- Length: 57:33
- Labels: Because Music (Europe); Nonesuch Records (US)
- Producers: Marc Antoine Moreau; Laurent Jais; Damon Albarn

Amadou & Mariam chronology
Dimanche à Bamako (2005)	Welcome To Mali (2008)	Folila (2012)

Welcome to Mali is the fifth studio album by Malian musicians Amadou & Mariam. It was released on Because Music on November 17, 2008, in Europe and was released on Nonesuch Records on March 24, 2009, in the United States.

In 2012 it was awarded a gold certification from the Independent Music Companies Association which indicated sales of at least 75,000 copies throughout Europe.

== Track listing ==
No.	Title	Writer(s)	Length
1.	"Sabali"	Albarn, Doumbia, Moreau	3:15
2.	"Ce N'est Pas Bon"	Bagayoko, Moreau	3:49
3.	"Magosa"	Doumbia	3:43
4.	"Djama"	Bagayoko, Dembele	3:15
5.	"Djuru"	Doumbia	3:35
6.	"Je Te Kiffe (feat. Juan Rozoff)"	Bagayoko, Rosoff	4:18
7.	"Masiteladi (feat. -M-)"	Bagayoko	3:56
8.	"Africa (feat. K'Naan)"	Bagayoko, Keinan	3:48
9.	"Compagnon de la Vie"	Bagayoko	3:46
10.	"Unissons-nous (feat. Keziah Jones)"	Doumbia	4:16
11.	"Bozos"	Bagayoko	3:46
12.	"I Follow You (Nia Na Fin)"	Bagayoko	4:02
13.	"Welcome to Mali"	Bagayoko	3:20
14.	"Batoma"	Doumbia	4:13
15.	"Sebeke"	Bagayoko, Doumbia	4:31
16.	"Boula (hidden track)"
Total length:			57:33

== Singles ==
"Sabali," released on 27 October 2008, was the first single from the album. The second single was "Masiteladi."

== Reception ==
Professional ratings
Aggregate scores
Source	Rating
Metacritic	86/100
Review scores
Source	Rating
AllMusic	4.5/5 stars
The A.V. Club	A−
Christgau’s Consumer Guide	A
Entertainment Weekly	B+
Mojo	4/5 stars
The Observer	5/5 stars
Q	4/5 stars
Pitchfork	8.4/10
Uncut	5/5 stars
Under the Radar	9/10

Welcome to Mali has received mostly positive reviews. On the review aggregate site Metacritic, the album has a score of 86 out of 100, indicating "Universal acclaim."

Keith Phillips of The A.V. Club gave the album a grade of A−, writing "Welcome To Mali sounds heavily produced but not overproduced, and even with the pings and whizzing, Amadou’s playing and the pair’s singing insure it never sounds less than organic." In another positive review, Pitchfork Media's Joe Tangari wrote: "This album is an affirmation of global connectivity and an emerging global culture that transcends and repurposes tradition as it sees fit-- the sound of Mali merging with the world at large."

Paste's Nick Marino, on the other hand, called the album "frustratingly uneven," writing: "[D]espite moments of exuberance, it can also feel like a mundane grind [...]"

In August 2009, the webzine Pitchfork Media named Sabali the 249th track in their staff list "The Top 500 Tracks of the 2000s" and earned a Grammy Award for Best Contemporary World Music Album nomination in 2010.
