= Roo Panes =

English musical artist (born 1988)

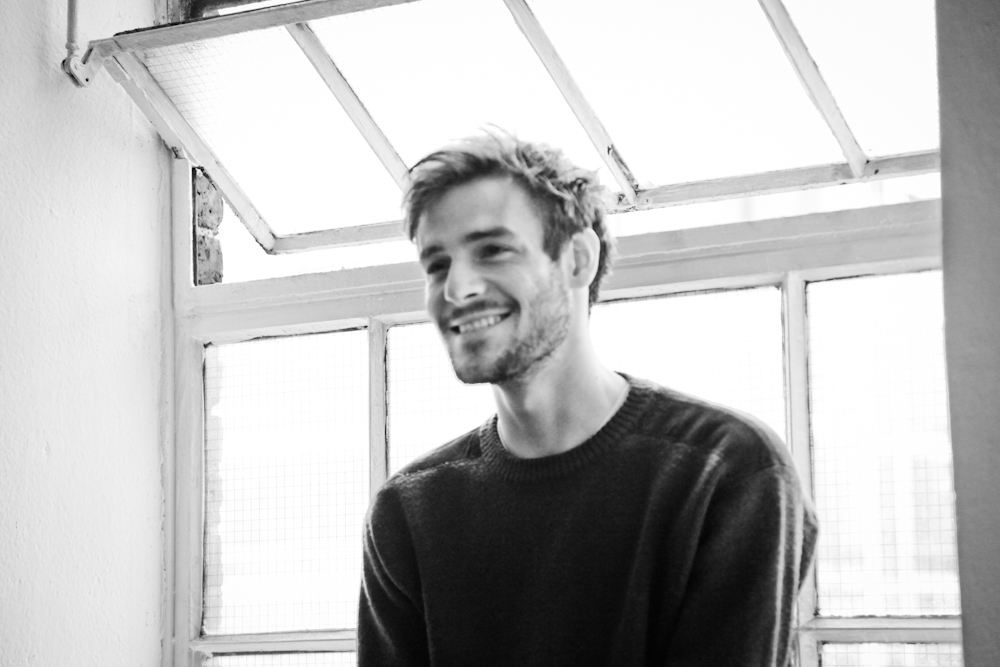

Background information
- Born: Andrew Panes; 8 June 1988 (age 38); Wimborne, Dorset, England
- Genres: Folk
- Occupation: Singer-songwriter
- Instrument: 12 strings guitar
- Years active: 2012–present
- Label: CRC Music Group Ltd
- Website: roopanes.uk

Andrew "Roo" Panes (born 8 June 1988) is an English folk singer-songwriter and model. He has released three EPs: Once (2012), Weight of Your World (2012), and Land of the Living (2013). His début LP Little Giant was released in Autumn 2014, with the leading single "Tiger Striped Sky" previously released on 23 June 2014. His follow-up album Paperweights came in 2016. His third album Quiet Man arrived in 2018, with a deluxe edition released in the following year. His latest studio album was released on 24 March 2023 with the vinyl record becoming available on 5 May 2023. Panes plays a 12-string acoustic guitar. Introspective lyrics and a band of string-players contribute to a genre of classical folk music.

Panes gained a wide audience in 2012 after participating in a campaign for Burberry as he joined actress Gabriella Wilde as Burberry label's new campaign star. The contract also included recording music for Burberry Acoustic and modelling.

== Background ==
Panes comes from a musical background. His grandmother was a classical pianist, and his mother studied performing arts at Guildhall School of Music and Drama and then worked in theatre. His twin sister is a photographer, and his older sister is an illustrator who has developed and designed the artwork for all of his albums.

His 2012 song “Know Me Well”--released with the Little Giant album (2014)--was used over the end credits of the Christmas special of the BBC comedy series Cuckoo (the final episode of Series 2).

Panes received the nickname 'Roo' after falling into a river as a child. It was also an homage to a Winnie-the-Pooh character who met a similar fate while playing a game called Poohsticks.

== Studio albums ==
Year	Title	Track listing
2014	Little Giant	1. "Know Me Well"; 2. "Indigo Home"; 3. "Little Giant"; 4. "Deeper Than Shallow"; 5. "Once"; 6. "Tiger Striped Sky"; 7. "Home from Home"; 8. "Different Child"; 9. "Sing for the Wind"; 10. "Hands"; 11. "How Long"; 12. "Ran Before the Storm"

Year	Title	Track listing
2016	Paperweights	1. "Stay with Me"; 2. "Corner of My Eye"; 3. "The Original"; 4. "Lullaby Love"; 5. "Paperweights"; 6. "Water Over Fire"; 7. "Vanished into Everything"; 8. "I Was Here"; 9. "Summer Thunder"; 10. "Where I Want to Go"; Hidden track: "Awoken"

Year	Title	Track listing
2018	Quiet Man	1. "A Message to Myself"; 2. "My Sweet Refuge"; 3. "Sketches of Summer"; 4. "Ophelia"; 5. "A Year in a Garden"; 6. "My Narrow Road"; 7. "A Gift to You"; 8. "Cub"; 9. "Quiet Man"; 10. "Warrior"; 11. "Peace Be with You"

Year	Title	Track listing
2019	Quiet Man (Deluxe Edition)	1. "A Message to Myself"; 2. "My Sweet Refuge"; 3. "Sketches of Summer"; 4. "Ophelia"; 5. "A Year in a Garden"; 6. "My Narrow Road"; 7. "A Gift to You"; 8. "Cub"; 9. "Quiet Man"; 10. "Warrior"; 11. "Soldier Of Hope"; 12. "Commentator"; 13. "Thinking Of Japan"; 14. "All These Walking Thoughts"; 15. "Little Giant - Live At Shepherd's Bush Empire"; 16. "Corner Of My Eye - Live At Shepherd's Bush Empire"; 17. "A Year In A Garden - Live At Shepherd's Bush Empire"; 18. "Ophelia - Live At Shepherd's Bush Empire"; 19. "My Narrow Road - Live At Shepherd's Bush Empire"; 20. "Quiet Man - Live At Shepherd's Bush Empire"; 21. "Cub - Live At Shepherd's Bush Empire"

Year	Title	Track listing
2023	The Summer Isles	1. "A Handful of Summer"; 2. "The Summer Isles (Sunrise)"; 3. "Fairy Falls"; 4. "I Just Love You"; 5. "Our Time"; 6. "Suburban Pines"; 7. "Samalaman Bay"; 8. "Notes from a Holiday"; 9. "Arcadia"; 10. "Letter to the Boy"; 11. "Childhood"; 12. "Let It Be a Long Time"; 13. "Leave That Light On"; 14. "Remember Fall In Montreal"; 15. "The Summer Isles (Sundown)"

== EP ==
Year	Title	Track listing
2012	Once	1. "I'll Move Mountains"; 2. "Different Child"; 3. "Once"; 4. "Mistral"
2012	Weight of Your World	1. "Know Me Well"; 2. "Weight of Your World"; 3. "Sing for the Wind"
2013	Land of the Living	1. "Glory Days"; 2. "Little Giant"; 3. "Home from Home"; 4. "Land of the Living"; 5. "Silver Moon"
2020	Pacific	1. "Listen To The One Who Loves You"; 2. "Pacific"; 3. "Colour In Your Heart"; 4. "The Sun Will Rise Over The Year"; 5. "There's A Place"
2022	Nightjar and the Nightingale	1. "Nightjar And The Nightingale"; 2. "Childhood"; 3. "I Just Love You"; 4. "Daydreamer"; 5. "Remember Fall In Montreal"; 6. "Big Wide World"

== Singles ==
Year	Song	Album
2011	"I'll Move Mountains"	Once (EP)
2012	"Silver Moon"	Land of the Living (EP)
2012	"Know Me Well"	Little Giant
2013	"Open Road"	Weight of Your World (EP)
2013	"Home From Home"	Little Giant
2014	"Tiger Striped Sky"	Little Giant
2016	"Where I Want To Go"	Paperweights
2016	"Stay With Me"	Paperweights
2016	"Lullaby Love"	Paperweights
2017	"Soldier of Hope"	
2017	"A Message To Myself"	Quiet Man
2018	"My Sweet Refuge"	Quiet Man
2018	"Sketches of Summer"	Quiet Man
2018	"Ophelia"	Quiet Man
2019	"Warrior"	Quiet Man

== Videography ==
- 2011: "I'll Move Mountains"
- 2012: "Silver Moon"
- 2012: "Know Me Well"
- 2013: "Open Road"
- 2013: "Home From Home"
- 2014: "Tiger Striped Sky"
- 2016: "Where I Want To Go"
- 2016: "Stay With Me"
- 2016: "Lullaby Love"
- 2017: "A Message to Myself"
- 2018: "My Sweet Refuge"
- 2018: "Sketches of Summer"
- 2018: "Ophelia"
- 2019: "Warrior"
- 2021: "I Just Love You"
