= Gumby (album) =

Studio album by various artists
- Released: 1989
- Genre: Novelty, various
- Length: 38:01
- Label: Buena Vista
- Producer: Shepard Stern

Professional ratings
Review scores
Source	Rating
Allmusic	2.5/5 stars

Gumby is an album produced by Shepard Stern and released in 1989 as a tribute to Art Clokey's stop-motion animated series Gumby. The cover is reminiscent of The Beatles' White Album.

== Track listing ==
No.	Title	Writer(s)	Artist	Length
1.	"(In Love) With You Gumby"	Dweezil and Moon Unit Zappa	Dweezil and Moon Unit Zappa	3:41
2.	"Concrete and Clay"	Thomas Moeller and Brian Parker	Eddie Wade	3:39
3.	"Zydeco Gumby Ya Ya"	Jeffrey Barnes	Brave Combo	2:23
4.	"Bend Me, Shape Me"	Laurence Weiss and Scott English	Donna McElroy	4:36
5.	"Gumby, We Love You"	Sly Dunbar	Sly and Robbie	4:30
6.	"I Like Gumby"	Jonathan Richman	Jonathan Richman	2:57
7.	"Pokey's Polka"	Carl Finch, Mitch Marine, Jeffrey Barnes, and Cenobio Hernandez	Brave Combo	3:02
8.	"The Ballad of Gumby"	Shepard Stern	Rick Schulman	4:07
9.	"We All Are Gumby"	Michael Silversher and Jeff Borgeson	Flo and Eddie	6:00
10.	"The Gumby Heart Song"	Pete Kleinow	Frank Sinatra, Jr.	3:06

== Additional personnel ==
Executive producer: Shepard Stern
Associate producers: Ron Kidd and Pat Patrick
Art direction: Dick Duerrstein
