= So in Love with You (Texas song) =

1994 single by Texas

Single by Texas

from the album Ricks Road
- B-side: "(Instrumental Version)"; "One Love"
- Released: 31 January 1994
- Genre: Alternative rock
- Length: 4:46
- Label: Phonogram; TEX(AS/CD/CX/CM) 11
- Songwriter(s): McElhone / Spiteri
- Producer(s): Paul Fox

Texas singles chronology
"You Owe It All to Me" (1993)	"So in Love with You" (1994)	"Say What You Want" (1997)

Music video
- "So in Love with You" on YouTube

"So in Love with You" was the third and final UK single (two further singles being released in Germany) to be taken from Scottish band Texas' third studio album, Ricks Road (1993). The song is written by band members Johnny McElhone and Sharleen Spiteri, and produced by Paul Fox. Released in January 1994 by Phonogram Records, it became the biggest hit single from the album, peaking at number 28 on the UK Singles Chart in February.

== Critical reception ==
Alan Jones from Music Week gave the song three out of five, writing, "A crisp, mature and likeable single from the band who promise much but rarely attain big sales outside their Scottish homeland. As the more accessible 'So Called Friend' and 'You Owe It All to Me' peaked at numbers 30 and 39 respectively, it's unlikely that this will fare any better, despite the presence of live versions of both of these numbers." Pan-European magazine Music & Media wrote, "Sharleen Spiteri spits out another dynamic love song by the standards once set by her fellow countryman Scott Walker. The soft and hard components are beautifully linked by strings."

== Music video ==
The accompanying music video for "So in Love with You" was directed by American illustrator, photographer and film director Matt Mahurin. It was produced by Louise Feldman for O Pictures and released on 17 January 1994. In the video, sadness, humour and longing are explored in an emotional odyssey.

== Track listing ==
- 7" vinyl & cassette single (TEXAS 11 / TEXCM 11)
1. "So in Love with You" – 4:46
2. "So in Love with You" (Instrumental Version) – 4:46

(To date the 'Instrumental Version' has not appeared on CD.)

- CD1 (TEXCD 11 / 858 237-2)
1. "So in Love with You" – 4:46
2. "So Called Friend" – 3:44
3. "One Love" – 2:35
4. "You Owe It All to Me" – 3:38

(Tracks 2,3 and 4 are a BBC Radio 1 session recorded live at the Carnegie Deli in New York City.)

- CD2 'Live EP' (TEXCX 11 / 858 239-2)
1. "So in Love with You" (Live) – 4:29
2. "Why Believe in You" (Live) – 5:28
3. "Prayer For You" (Live) – 6:52
4. "Everyday Now" (Live) – 4:43

(All tracks recorded live at Glasgow Old Fruit Market on Sunday 7 November 1993. The foldout sleeve shows pictures from the show.) (The CD sleeve incorrectly lists "Why Believe in You" as Why I Believe in You.)

== Charts ==
Chart (1994)	Peak position
Europe (Eurochart Hot 100)	71
UK Singles (OCC)	28
