= You Owe It All to Me =

1993 single by Texas

Single by Texas

from the album Ricks Road
- B-side: "Don't Help Me Through"; "Make Me Want to Scream"; "Strange That I Want You"
- Released: 18 October 1993
- Length: 3:43
- Label: Vertigo
- Songwriter(s): Johnny McElhone; Sharleen Spiteri
- Producer(s): Paul Fox

Texas singles chronology
| "So Called Friend" (1993) | "You Owe It All to Me" (1993) | "So in Love with You" (1994) |

"You Owe It All to Me" is a song by Scottish band Texas, released in October 1993 by Vertigo Records as the second single from their third studio album, Ricks Road (1993). It was written by Johnny McElhone and Sharleen Spiteri, and produced by Paul Fox. The song reached number 39 on the UK Singles Chart.

== Music video ==
The music video for "You Owe It All to Me" was directed by British director and editor Dani Jacobs. It was filmed in Arizona and features Sharleen Spiteri and Ally McErlaine filmed in the style of a road movie with the pair encountering another version of themselves along the way.

== Track listings ==
- 7-inch and cassette single
1. "You Owe It All to Me"
2. "Don't Help Me Through"
- CD1
1. "You Owe It All to Me"
2. "Don't Help Me Through"
3. "Make Me Want to Scream"
4. "Strange That I Want You"
- CD2
1. "You Owe It All to Me"
2. "I Don't Want a Lover"
3. "So Called Friend"
4. "Revolution"

Note: All tracks were recorded live in Room 530 at the Munich Hilton on 14 September 1993

== Charts ==
| Chart (1993) | Peak position |
|---|---|
| Europe (Eurochart Hot 100) | 91 |
| UK Singles (OCC) | 39 |

== Release history ==
| Region | Date | Format(s) | Label(s) | Ref. |
|---|---|---|---|---|
| United Kingdom | 18 October 1993 | 7-inch vinyl; CD1; cassette | Vertigo | |
| United Kingdom | 25 October 1993 | CD2 | Vertigo | |
| Australia | 17 January 1994 | CD; cassette | Vertigo | |
