= Three Weeks =

Three Weeks may refer to:

- The Three Weeks, a period of mourning commemorating the destruction of both the first and second Jewish Temples in Judaism
- Three Weeks (book), an early example of mass-market women's erotic fiction by Elinor Glyn
  - Three Weeks (1914 film), a film directed by Perry N. Vekroff, based on the book
  - Three Weeks (1924 film), a film drama directed by Alan Crosland, based on the book
- ThreeWeeks, a magazine that covers the Edinburgh Festivals
- "Three Weeks", a song on the album Polka Party with Brave Combo: Live and Wild! by Brave Combo
