= Paul Fox (music producer) =

American record producer (1954–2022)

Paul Robert Fox (May 22, 1954 – December 25, 2022) was an American music producer, who was best known for producing recording artists such as Faker, The Green Children, Gene Loves Jezebel, 10,000 Maniacs, XTC, Phish, Texas, Sunfall Festival, Robyn Hitchcock and the Egyptians, The Sugarcubes, Too Much Joy, They Might Be Giants, Edwin McCain, Semisonic, and Grant Lee Buffalo.

Fox also played as a session player with the Pointer Sisters, Rod Stewart, Patti LaBelle, Mötley Crüe, DeBarge, and Natalie Cole among others.

== Personal life and death ==
Fox was married in 1988 to songwriter Franne Golde He was diagnosed with Early-onset Alzheimer's disease in 2012. He practiced yoga.

Fox died on December 25, 2022, at the age of 68.

== Discography ==
Year	Title	Artist	Role
1983	Break Out	The Pointer Sisters	Emulator
1984	"Own the Night"	George McCrae	Keyboards; Electronic Drums; Producer
1985	Nightshift	Commodores	Synthesizer; Bass programming Drums programming Arrangement on "I Keep Running" and "Janet"; Writer on "Janet"
1985	Contact	The Pointer Sisters	Additional synthesizer Emulator
1986	Hot Together	The Pointer Sisters	Synthesizer except "Sexual Power"; Drums and associate producer on 4 tracks Horn arrangement Soloist; Tom-Tom
1986	Chico DeBarge	Chico DeBarge	Associate producer, drum programming, synthesizer and writer on "Talk to Me"; Programming on "Desperate" and "If It Takes All Night"
1987	All for Love	Princess	Producer, keyboards, bass, drums, and programming on 2 tracks
1987	"He Turned Me Out"	The Pointer Sisters	Associate producer on "Translation"
1987	Scarlett and Black	Scarlett and Black	Additional drum programming on "Let Yourself Go-Go"; Bass synthesizer on "Yesterday's Gone"; Keyboards; Producer
1989	Oranges & Lemons	XTC	Producer
1990	Kiss of Life	Gene Loves Jezebel	Keyboards; Producer
1991	Perspex Island	Robyn Hitchcock and the Egyptians	Producer
1991	Cereal Killers	Too Much Joy	Keyboards; Backing vocals Producer
1992	Stick Around for Joy	The Sugarcubes	Producer; Mixing
1992	Our Time in Eden	10,000 Maniacs	Producer
1992	The Wallflowers	The Wallflowers	Producer
1993	Blow	Straitjacket Fits	Producer
1993	Ricks Road	Texas	String arrangement Writer on "So Called Friend"; Producer
1993	MTV Unplugged	10,000 Maniacs	Producer
1993	Womb Amnesia	Subject to Change	Producer
1994	Loose	Victoria Williams	Producer
1994	Necessary Angels	Sara Hickman	Producer
1994	Hoist	Phish	Producer
1994	John Henry	They Might Be Giants	Producer
1995	Honor Among Thieves	Edwin McCain	Hammond organ Piano; Producer
1995	Free Like We Want 2 B	Ziggy Marley and the Melody Makers	Additional production
1996	Great Divide	Semisonic	Producer
1996	Gotta Get Over Greta	The Nields	Keyboards, tambourine, producer, and mixing on "Taxi Girl"
1997	Sweet 75	Sweet 75	Mellotron; Organ; Producer
1997	Moonbathing on Sleeping Leaves	Sky Cries Mary	Cello arranger Producer
1998	Jubilee	Grant Lee Buffalo	Producer
1998	Phantom Planet Is Missing	Phantom Planet	Producer
1998	One by One	Agents of Good Roots	Producer
1999	Deconstruction	Meredith Brooks	Producer on "Sin City"
2001	Tyler Hilton	Tyler Hilton	Producer
2001	South	Heather Nova	Producer on "Virus of the Mind"
2002	Divine Discontent	Sixpence None the Richer	Producer; Orchestration
2004	Terra Naomi	Terra Naomi	Writer on "Misery" and "I Still Love You"; Engineer; Producer
2004	Bang Bang Bang	Sunfall Festival	Producer
2006	Virtually	Terra Naomi	Producer
2006	The Green Children	The Green Children	Additional keyboards Additional programming Bass synthesizer Engineer; Producer
2006	Motherlode	Sara Hickman	Producer on "Birdhouse"
2007	Under the Influence	Terra Naomi	Producer
2007	Be the Twilight	Faker	Producer
