= Let's Kiss: 25th Anniversary Album =

Studio album by Brave Combo
- Released: October 28, 2004
- Genre: Polka
- Length: 32:04
- Label: Dentone Records
- Producer: Carl Finch; Bubba Hernandez

Brave Combo chronology
Box of Ghosts (2003)	Let's Kiss: 25th Anniversary Album (2004)	Holidays (2005)

Let's Kiss: 25th Anniversary Album is an album by the American polka band Brave Combo, released through Dentone Records on October 28, 2004. In 2005, the album won Brave Combo the Grammy Award for Best Polka Album.

== Track listing ==
1. "Dutch Hornpipe" (Full Band) (Schottische) – 2:55
2. "Red River Valley" (Polka) – 3:01
3. "Bumble Bee" (Polka) (Eddie Fullylove) – 2:31
4. "Take Me Out to the Ballgame" (Polka) – 2:09
5. "Civilized" (Waltz) (Carl Finch) – 3:16
6. "Starlight" (Polka) (Joe Oberaitis) – 2:15
7. "El Golpe Traidor" (Polka) (Remberto López Garza) – 3:06
8. "Let's Kiss" (Csárdás) – 2:55
9. "Willkommen Oktoberfest" (Polka) (Finch) – 2:53
10. "Acariciame" (Polka) (Bubba Hernandez) – 2:59
11. "Cherry Pink and Apple Blossom White" (Polka) (Mack David) – 2:43
12. "Take Me Out to the Ballgame" (Oberek) – 2:53
13. "Aja Sam" (Polka) – 3:04
14. "The Simpsons" (Polka) (Danny Elfman) – 1:08
15. "Dutch Hornpipe" (Dub Version) (Schottische) – 2:52

== Personnel ==
- Jeffrey Barnes – Arranger, Clarinet, Sax (Alto), Sax (Bass), Sax (Tenor), Saxophone, Tambourine
- Matthew Barnhart – Engineer
- Nolan Brett – Mastering
- Mack David – Composer
- Eric Delegard – Engineer
- Alan Emert – Drums
- Carl Finch – Accordion, Arranger, Audio Production, Concept, Guitar, Keyboards, Liner Notes, Producer, Vocals
- Robert Greeson – Art Direction
- Bubba Hernandez – Arranger, Bass, Guitar, Guitar (Bass), Producer, Tuba, Vocals
- Danny O'Brien – Trumpet
- Wesley Kucera - Drums
- Matt Pence – Engineer
- Gary Rhamy – Engineer
- Dave Willingham – Engineer
- Lori Young – Photography

== See also ==
- Polka in the United States
