= Misfits (Sara Hickman album) =

Studio album by Sara Hickman
- Released: March 18, 1997
- Genre: Folk/pop
- Length: 66:49
- Label: Shanachie
- Producers: Sara Hickman, Angelo Badalamenti, Marvin Etzioni, Paul Fox

Sara Hickman chronology
| Necessary Angels (1994) | Misfits (1997) | Two Kinds of Laughter (1998) |

Misfits is an album by the American singer-songwriter Sara Hickman, released in 1997. It was produced in part by Paul Fox.

== Critical reception ==
Professional ratings
Review scores
| Source | Rating |
|---|---|
| AllMusic | 3/5 stars |

The Washington Post called Hickman's original songs "alternately haunting and charming."

== Track listing ==
1. "Cesar Stasney Introduction" – 0:44
2. "Strong Woman" (Goldenberg, Hickman) – 3:58
3. "Dump Truck" (Etzioni, Hickman) – 4:16
4. "Secrets of Love II" (Hickman, McLemore) – 3:19
5. "Baby, It's Cold Outside" (Loesser) – 2:48
6. "Everyone's Gone to the Moon" (King) – 3:43
7. "Nobody Goes to the Moon Anymore" (Bramblett) – 2:55
8. "Satin Sheet for Alice" (Hickman) – 3:11
9. "Rosie's Theme" (Hickman) – 1:00
10. "Let Me Take Your Picture" (Hickman) – 3:23
11. "Hey! Where You Goin'?" (Hickman) – 4:07
12. "Grandma's Feather Bed" (Connor) – 0:29
13. "False Pretenses" (Boyd) – 2:47
14. "I Want to Go Swimming in Your Eyes" (Hickman) – 2:24
15. "Zip-a-Dee-Doo-Dah" (Gilbert, Wrubel) – 3:12
16. "I Think I Love You" (Romeo) – 4:09
17. "Take Me With You" (Batteau, Hickman) – 4:11
18. "Romania" (Hickman) – 5:53
19. "Like a Collar on a Dog" (Hickman) – 4:52
20. "Radiation Man" (Hickman) – 5:28

== Personnel ==
- Sara Hickman – acoustic guitar, banjo, guitar, vocals, background vocals
- Sandy Abernethy – background vocals, whistling
- Josh Alan – electric guitar
- Paul Averitt – background vocals
- Kevin Axt – upright bass
- Scott Babcock – drums
- Colin Boyd – background vocals
- Brave Combo – performer
- Steve Brown – bass guitar
- Jim Cocke – keyboards
- Kim Corbet – background vocals
- Mike Daane – bass guitar
- Robert Emery – background vocals
- Paul Fox – background vocals
- Glenn Fukinaga – bass guitar
- Jay Gillian – background vocals
- David Grissom – electric guitar
- Brian Hartig – drums
- Richard Hunter – background vocals
- Jackopierce – background vocals
- Freddie Jones – background vocals
- Tony Levin – bass guitar
- Robin Macy – background vocals
- Mitch Marine – background vocals
- Kris McKay – background vocals
- Davis McLarty – drums
- Brad McLemore – guitar
- Sam Paulos – background vocals
- Drew Phelps – bass guitar
- Reggie Rueffer – fiddle
- David Sancious – piano, background vocals
- Chris Searles – percussion
- Amy Seltzer – background vocals
- Terry Slemmons – background vocals
- Larry Spencer – horn, background vocals
- Alma Squillante – background vocals
- Paul Sweeney – mandolin
- Debbie Talasek – background vocals
- Craig "Niteman" Taylor – background vocals
- James "Son" Thomas – background vocals
- Paul Williams – background vocals

Production

- Producers: Sara Hickman, Angelo Badalamenti, Marvin Etzioni, Paul Fox
- Executive producer: Sara Hickman
- Engineers: Marty Lester, Kevin Smith, Terry Slemmons, Ed Thacker
- Arranger: Sara Hickman
- Drum programming: Sara Hickman
- Mixing: Marty Lester
- Mastering: Jerry Tubb
