= Polkasonic =

Studio album by Brave Combo
- Released: September 14, 1999
- Genre: Polka
- Length: 32:04
- Label: Cleveland International

Brave Combo chronology
Polka Party with Brave Combo: Live and Wild! (1998)	Polkasonic (1999)	The Process (2000)

Professional ratings
Review scores
Source	Rating
AllMusic	3/5 stars
The Encyclopedia of Popular Music	3/5 stars

Polkasonic is an album by the American polka band Brave Combo. It was released through Cleveland International Records in 1999. In 2000, the album won Brave Combo the Grammy Award for Best Polka Album. It was the third Grammy nomination and first win for the band.

== Track listing ==
1. "Down at the Friendly Tavern" (Wisniewski) – 1:54
2. "Red Wing" – 2:32
3. "Why Oh Why" – 2:44
4. "Polka Dancer" (Stankovic) – 2:22
5. "Only for Love" (Finch) – 2:39
6. "Apples, Peaches, Pumpkin Pie" (Irby, Jr) – 2:43
7. "Conchita, the Waitress" (Hernandez) – 3:09
8. "Skytrain" (Finch) – 3:23
9. "Glamorous Gal" – 3:27
10. "Down in the Valley" – 3:43
11. "Crumbling Heart" (Oberaitis) – 1:34
12. "Purple Haze - The Jimi Hendrix Polka" (Jimi Hendrix) – 1:54

== Personnel ==
- Jeffrey Barnes – harmonica, vocals, woodwind, electronic horn
- Sunana Batra – project coordinator
- Brave Combo – arranger, producer
- Adam Clark – engineer
- Joe Cripps – percussion, vocals
- Eric Delegard – engineer
- Alan Emert – drums
- Carl Finch – guitar, accordion, arranger, keyboards, vocals, producer, liner notes
- Bubba Hernandez – bass, tuba, vocals
- Danny O'Brien – trumpet
- Frank Vale – mastering

== See also ==
- Polka in the United States
