= Polka Party =

Polka Party could refer to:

- Polka Party!, the fourth studio album by "Weird Al" Yankovic
  - "Polka Party!", a polka medley included on the album
- Polka Party with Brave Combo: Live and Wild!, an album by the American polka band Brave Combo
