= Necessary Angels =

Studio album by Sara Hickman
- Released: 1994
- Recorded: Congress House, Houston, Texas, Arlyn's, Austin, Texas, Bearsville Studios, Bearsville, New York
- Genre: Folk/pop
- Length: 55:48
- Label: Discovery
- Producer: Sara Hickman, Paul Fox, Mark Hallman

Sara Hickman chronology
Shortstop (1990)	Necessary Angels (1994)	Misfits (1997)

Necessary Angels is the third album by the American singer-songwriter Sara Hickman, released in 1994 (see 1994 in music).

After Hickman was dropped by her label, Elektra Records, her fans contributed to allow her to buy back the unreleased tapes that made up the album.

== Critical reception ==
Professional ratings
Review scores
Source	Rating
AllMusic	4.5/5 stars
The Encyclopedia of Popular Music	4/5 stars

AllMusic called the album Hickman's "boldest, most mature, and most musically sophisticated offering to date." New York called it an "enormously rich album." Billboard wrote that Hickman "eschews some of her earlier wordplay for lyrics that are cleaner and sharper ... Lovely."

== Track listing ==
1. "Pursuit of Happiness" (Hickman) – 4:55
2. "Shadowboxing" (Hickman) – 4:24
3. "The Best of Times" (Hickman) – 4:41
4. "Sister and Sam" (Hickman) – 5:33
5. "Time Will Tell" (Hickman) – 1:59
6. "Eye of the Storm" (Hickman) – 6:15
7. "Oh, Daddy" (Hickman, David Batteau) – 4:24
8. "Room of One's Own" (Hickman, Gerald O'Brien) – 5:26
9. "Tiger in a Teacup Town" (Hickman) – 4:32
10. "Slippery" (Hickman) – 4:10
11. "Joy" (Hickman) – 5:23
12. "The Place Where the Garage Used to Stand" (Hickman) – 4:06

== Personnel ==
- Sara Hickman – acoustic guitar, flute, guitar, percussion, electric guitar, vocals, background vocals, choir, harmony vocals
- Amy Atchley – choir
- David Batteau – guitar, background vocals
- Adrian Belew – acoustic guitar, guitar, mandolin, calliope, electric guitar, background vocals
- Jim Cocke – organ, keyboards
- Mike Daane – bass guitar
- Carl Finch – accordion
- Glenn Fukunaga – bass guitar
- Rafael Gayol – drums
- Mark Hallman – percussion, background vocals, choir, shaker, tambo drums
- Ethridge Hill – trumpet
- Bradley Kopp – electric guitar
- Danny Levin – cello
- Tony Levin – bass guitar
- Mitch Marine – drums
- Jerry Marotta – percussion, drums
- Darcy Matthews – background vocals, choir
- Dominic Matthews – choir
- Genevieve Matthews – choir
- Ian Matthews – choir
- Kris McKay – choir
- Brad McLemore – electric guitar
- Pamela Miller – choir
- Paul Pearcy – percussion, drums
- Pierce Pettis – acoustic guitar
- Mark Rubin – upright bass
- David Sancious – piano, keyboards
- Chris Searles – percussion, sound effects, tambourine, noise
- Tommy Taylor – drums
- Richard Weiss – choir
- Morgan Wommack – choir
- Brad Young – background vocals

Production

- Producers: Sara Hickman, Paul Fox, Mark Hallman
- Engineers: Mark Hallman, Marty Lester, Kevin Smith, Ed Thacker
- Assistant engineers: Marty Lester, Allan Queen, Mike Reiter
- Arranger: Sara Hickman, Paul Fox
- String arrangements: Sara Hickman, Danny Levin
- Mixing: Sara Hickman, Mark Hallman, Marty Lester, Kevin Smith, Ed Thacker
- Remixing: Sara Hickman, Mark Hallman, Marty Lester, Kevin Smith
- Mastering: Joe Gastwirt
- Art direction: Sara Hickman
- Illustrations: Sara Hickman
- Photography: Lynn Sugarman
- Hair stylist: Tony Fielding
- Make-up: Tony Fielding
- Clothing/wardrobe: Cyndy Goodman
