= Equal Scary People =

Studio album by Sara Hickman
- Released: 1988
- Genre: Folk/pop
- Length: 38:42
- Label: Four Dots; Elektra; Discoveries
- Producer: Sara Hickman, Carl Finch

Sara Hickman chronology
Equal Scary People (1988)	Shortstop (1990)

Equal Scary People is the first album by the American singer-songwriter Sara Hickman, released in 1988 on Four Dots. It was rereleased in 1989 on Elektra Records.

== Production ==
The album was co-produced by Carl Finch.

== Critical reception ==
Professional ratings
Review scores
Source	Rating
AllMusic	3/5 stars
The Encyclopedia of Popular Music	3/5 stars
The Rolling Stone Album Guide	3/5 stars

Trouser Press wrote that "with winning songs that are emotionally resonant and a little loopy, Equal Scary People ... is an album that easily stands out in a soundalike crowd." The Los Angeles Times wrote that Hickman "offers a hip but down-home, honest but irony-laden mix that fans of Michelle Shocked and k.d. lang should relate to just fine."

== Track listing ==
1. "Simply" (Hickman) – 3:03
2. "Last Night Was a Big Rain" (Hickman) – 3:19
3. "500x (The Train Song)" (Hickman) – 5:17
4. "Song for My Father" (Hickman) – 4:13
5. "Equal Scary People" (Hickman) – 4:38
6. "This Is a Man's World" (Brown) – 4:40
7. "Meant to Be" (Hickman) – 2:48
8. "Why Don't You" (Hickman) – 4:01
9. "I Wish I Were a Princess" (Creatore, Peretti, Weiss) – 3:07
10. "Under the Sycamore Tree" (Hickman) – 3:56

== Personnel ==
- Sara Hickman – bass guitar, guitar, sound effects, chorus, harmony vocals, drum samples
- Sandy Abernethy – chorus, harmony vocals
- Josh Alan – acoustic guitar
- Maurice Anderson – pedal steel
- Dougie Bryan – guitar, chorus, harmony vocals
- Carl Finch – organ, bass guitar, guitar, percussion, drums, vocals, harmony vocals, bass samples, hi hat
- Bubba Hernandez – bass guitar
- Mitch Marine – drums
- Brad McLemore – classical guitar
- Darryl Melugin – bass guitar
- Scott Murphy
- Reggie Rueffer – violin
- Terry Slemmons – electric guitar, harmony vocals
- Kenny Smith – drums, tambourine, chorus

Production

- Producer: Sara Hickman, Carl Finch
- Executive producer: Sara Hickman
- Engineer: Terry Slemmons
- Art direction: Sara Hickman
- Cover art concept: Sara Hickman
