= Ricks Road =

Studio album by Texas
- Released: 1 November 1993
- Recorded: 1992–1993
- Studio: Bearsville Studios, American Recording Co., New York
- Genre: Alternative rock
- Length: 47:48
- Label: Mercury; Vertigo (Europe)
- Producer: Paul Fox

Texas chronology
Mothers Heaven (1991)	Ricks Road (1993)	White on Blonde (1997)

Singles from Ricks Road
- 1. "So Called Friend" Released: 30 August 1993; 2. "You Owe It All to Me" Released: 18 October 1993; 3. "So in Love with You" Released: 31 January 1994; 4. "Fade Away" Released: 4 April 1994

Professional ratings
Review scores
Source	Rating
AllMusic	2/5 stars
NME	6/10

Ricks Road is the third album by Scottish rock band Texas. The album was released on 1 November 1993 by Mercury Records. The album peaked at number 18 in the UK and spent two weeks on the UK Albums Chart. It was certified Silver (for 60,000 copies sold) by the British Phonographic Industry in October 1997. In Australia, the album peaked at number 96 on the ARIA Albums Chart.

The album included three UK Top 40 singles; "So Called Friend" (#30), "You Owe It All to Me" (#39), and "So in Love with You" (#28).

== Track listing ==
All songs written by Johnny McElhone and Sharleen Spiteri except as indicated.

=== International release ===
No.	Title	Writer(s)	Length
1.	"So Called Friend"	Johnny McElhone, Sharleen Spiteri	3:42
2.	"Fade Away"	McElhone, Spiteri	3:03
3.	"Listen to Me"	McElhone, Spiteri	5:02
4.	"You Owe It All to Me"	McElhone, Spiteri	3:41
5.	"Beautiful Angel"	McElhone, Spiteri	3:20
6.	"So in Love with You"	McElhone, Spiteri	4:44
7.	"You've Got to Live a Little"	McElhone, Spiteri, Paul Fox	3:12
8.	"I Want to Go to Heaven"	McElhone, Spiteri	3:23
9.	"Hear Me Now"	McElhone, Spiteri, Ally McErlaine	4:11
10.	"Fearing These Days"	McElhone, Spiteri	4:18
11.	"I've Been Missing You"	McElhone, Spiteri	3:13
12.	"Winters End"	McElhone, Spiteri, Eddie Campbell	4:18
Total length:			47:48

=== US/Canadian release ===
1. "So Called Friend"
2. "Fade Away"
3. "Listen to Me"
4. "You Owe It All to Me"
5. "Beautiful Angel"
6. "So in Love with You"
7. "You've Got to Live a Little"
8. "I Want to Go to Heaven"
9. "Hear Me Now"
10. "Fearing These Days"
11. "Tired of Being Alone" (Al Green)
12. "Winters End"

== Personnel ==
Texas

- Sharleen Spiteri – vocals, guitar
- Ally McErlaine – guitar
- Johnny McElhone – bass
- Eddie Campbell – piano, Wurlitzer, B3 organ, backing vocals
- Richard Hynd – drums, percussion

Other personnel

- Assistant engineers – Chris Laidlan, Matt Westfield, Pete Lewis
- Engineering and mixing – Ed Thacker
- Mastering – Bob Ludwig
- Producer – Paul Fox
- String arrangements – Campbell, Jimmy Z, McElhone, Fox

== Charts ==
Chart performance for Ricks Road
Chart (1993–1994)	Peak position
Australian Albums (ARIA)	96
Dutch Albums (Album Top 100)	84
Spanish Albums (AFYVE)	17
Swedish Albums (Sverigetopplistan)	50
Swiss Albums (Schweizer Hitparade)	14
UK Albums (OCC)	18

== Certifications and sales ==
Region	Certification	Certified units/sales
France (SNEP)	2× Gold	200,000^{*}
Spain (PROMUSICAE)	Gold	50,000^{^}
United Kingdom (BPI)	Silver	60,000^{^}
United States	—	38,000
^{*} Sales figures based on certification alone.^{^} Shipments figures based on certification alone.
