= Click and Clack's As the Wrench Turns =

American animated sitcom

- Genre: Animated sitcom
- Created by: Howard K Grossman; Doug Berman
- Written by: Doug Berman; Tom Magliozzi; Ray Magliozzi; Doug Mayer; Tom Minton
- Directed by: Tom Sito
- Voices of: Tom Magliozzi; Ray Magliozzi; Kelli O'Hara; Juan Carlos Hernández; Cornell Womack; Barbara Rosenblat
- Theme music composer: Carl Finch
- Opening theme: "The William Tell Overture"
- Composers: Carl Finch; Brave Combo
- Country of origin: United States
- Original language: English
- No. of seasons: 1
- No. of episodes: 10

Production
- Executive producers: Howard Grossman; Robert Harris; Bill Kroyer
- Running time: 26 minutes
- Production companies: Atomic Cartoons; Howard K. Grossman Productions

Original release
- Network: PBS
- Release: July 9 – August 13, 2008

Related
- Car Talk

Click and Clack's As the Wrench Turns is an American animated sitcom animated by Atomic Cartoons that aired on PBS. The series follows the adventures of the brothers Click and Clack from their auto repair shop, Car Talk Plaza. It stars Tom (Click) and Ray Magliozzi (Clack), also known as the Tappet Brothers, from National Public Radio's Car Talk. The show was the first primetime animated series for a general audience to be produced and aired by PBS.

The series debuted on July 9, 2008, and additionally in various time slots depending on local station scheduling. The series aired its ten-episode season in two-episode blocks for five weeks. It ended on August 13, 2008 with 10 episodes.

== Cast ==
- Tom Magliozzi - Clack Tappet
- Ray Magliozzi - Click Tappet
- Kelli O'Hara - Beth Totenbag
- Juan Carlos Hernández - Fidel
- Cornell Womack - Reggie "Crusty" Crustwood
- Barbara Rosenblat - Sal

== Production ==
Executive producer Howard K. Grossman began pitching a television series based on Car Talk in 2001. On July 11, 2007, PBS announced that it had greenlit the series for debut in the summer of 2008. This is the first prime-time animated series in the history of PBS. While at first a direct adaptation of the radio show had been proposed, the final product is an animated sitcom featuring a new cast of fictional characters alongside the radio-show hosting Click and Clack.

The opening theme and other music for the series are produced by Carl Finch and composed, arranged, and performed by Finch and his Grammy-award-winning band, Brave Combo.

== Episodes ==
| No. | Title | Original release date | Prod. code |
|---|---|---|---|
| 1 | "Campaign" | July 9, 2008 | CT105 |
Click and Clack try to save the network by running for President so they can qualify for Federal matching funds.
| 2 | "Outsourcing" | July 9, 2008 | CT104 |
Click and Clack are overwhelmed with work so they outsource the radio show to India with unpredictable results. Garrison Keillor has a brief cameo as himself.
| 3 | "Boston Blackout" | July 16, 2008 | CT103 |
Mechanic Stash invents an auto repair robot called the Wallet Vac to help out in the garage, but its need for electricity cause a massive power outage in the northeastern U.S. Carl Kasell cameo as radio news anchor "Carl Carousel".
| 4 | "Pasta Wars" | July 16, 2008 | CT102 |
Click and Clack invent a pasta-fueled vehicle, the Fusilli 500. Jim Lehrer has a cameo as news anchor "Jim Lahair".
| 5 | "Gigantic Motors" | July 23, 2008 | CT107 |
Click and Clack lose their main sponsor and are forced to sign with Gigantic Motors who have nefarious plans for the radio duo.
| 6 | "Fidel vs. Zuzu" | July 23, 2008 | CT106 |
When the Dog Tickler claims garage dog Zuzu can diagnose car problems with her sense of smell, Fidel feels slighted and quits the garage.
| 7 | "Abercrombie & Wrench" | July 30, 2008 | CT101 |
When a high-tech repair shop featuring hunky mechanics opens nearby, Click and Clack fight back with a nod to the disco era. Jim Lehrer has a cameo as news anchor "Jim Lahair".
| 8 | "Pocket Full of Motor Oil" | August 6, 2008 | CT108 |
Crusty's niece is coming for a visit and she thinks he's still a professor at Harvard University.
| 9 | "Gotcha!" | August 13, 2008 | CT110 |
Click and Clack play practical jokes when a potential network benefactor visits the garage.
| 10 | "Casino" | August 13, 2008 | CT109 |
Click and Clack, believing they are of Native American descent, turn the garage into a casino.

== DVD releases ==
US DVD release

PBS Home Video and Paramount Home Entertainment released the entire run of Click and Clack's As the Wrench Turns on DVD. The two-disc set was released in the United States and Canada on September 30, 2008.

== Reception ==
Click and Clack's As the Wrench Turns received a largely negative response, with The New York Times commenting that "television seems to flatten and confine" Tom and Ray's spontaneity and that while the series is "indisputably adorable" it "lacks the magic of the Magliozzis unplugged." The Boston Herald opined that fans of Car Talk will be "excited to hear that Tom and Ray Magliozzi have expanded to PBS and television. Until they see the show." The show is described as "silly like a bad Saturday morning cartoon" and that the Magliozzi brothers are portrayed as "low-grade scam artists instead of the cheery, charming guys we know they are."

Christopher Kulik of DVD Verdict wrote in his review of the 2008 Paramount DVD release: "As a long-time devotee of Car Talk, I found this series to be a mixed bag. The humor is certainly there, and the Magliozzis' comic punch is still hitting hard, except their famous improvisation and spontaneity is practically thrown out the window. The result is Click & Clack 2.0, as the friendly voices are there but not the belly laughs or jolly merriment the boys audibly display every Saturday morning. The out-there stories themselves set up some big laughs, like when the boys discover pasta as an alternative energy source for automobiles, [pissing] off the local Mafioso in the process. Others lack any ingenuity whatsoever. The animation itself harks back to the '60s and '70s: very dim and dry, lacks real color and pizzazz, occasionally rough around the edges. Nothing special, unless you want to return to that old-fashioned, old-school look which was prevalent in George of the Jungle. Since the humor will whisk over children's heads, it's clear this show was created specifically for the older crowd, ones who are too slow to catch every gag in Family Guy. The show does earn points for its rich character design, courtesy of Stephen Silver, who also did the Clerks series with Kevin Smith."
