= Car Talk =

Long-running NPR talk show

- Genre: Automotive repair/advice, Humor
- Running time: approx. 50 min
- Country of origin: United States
- Language: English
- Home station: WBUR-FM
- Syndicates: National Public Radio (NPR)
- Hosted by: Tom Magliozzi; Ray Magliozzi
- Executive producer: Doug Berman
- Recording studio: Boston, Massachusetts
- Original release: 1977 (WBUR-FM); 1987 (nationally) – 2012 (original episodes); 2025–present (CarTalk+ podcast)
- Audio format: Monaural
- Opening theme: "Dawggy Mountain Breakdown" by David Grisman
- Other themes: "Dixie Flyer" (intermission) by Randy Newman; "Stump the Chumps" by B. J. Leiderman
- Website: www.cartalk.com
- Podcast: www.cartalk.com/radio/our-show

Car Talk is the humorous work of "Click and Clack, the Tappet Brothers", Tom and Ray Magliozzi, on automobile repair. Originally, Car Talk was a radio show that ran on National Public Radio (NPR) from 1977 until October 2012, when the Magliozzi brothers retired. Since their retirement, the oeuvre now includes a website and a podcast of reruns that is currently hosted by Apple Podcasts, Spotify, NPR Podcasts, and Stitcher. In 2025 Ray Magliozzi began hosting a revived version of Car Talk called Car Talk+. The Car Talk radio show was honored with a Peabody Award in 1992, and the Magliozzis were both inducted into the National Radio Hall of Fame in 2014 and the Automotive Hall of Fame in 2018.

== Premise ==
Car Talk was presented in the form of a call-in radio show: listeners called in with questions related to motor vehicle maintenance and repair. Most of the advice sought was diagnostic, with callers describing symptoms and demonstrating sounds of an ailing vehicle while the Magliozzis made an attempt to identify the malfunction over the telephone and give advice on how to fix it. While the hosts peppered their call-in sessions with jokes directed at both the caller and at themselves, the Magliozzis were usually able to arrive at a diagnosis. However, when they were stumped, they attempted anyway with an answer they claimed was "unencumbered by the thought process", the official motto of the show.

Edited reruns are carried on XM Satellite Radio (now SiriusXM) via both the Public Radio and NPR Now channels.

The Car Talk theme music is "Dawggy Mountain Breakdown" by bluegrass artist David Grisman.

=== Call-in procedure ===
Throughout the program, listeners were encouraged to dial the toll-free telephone number, 1-888-CAR-TALK (1-888-227-8255), which connected to a 24-hour answering service. Although the approximately 2,000 queries received each week were screened by the Car Talk staff, the questions were unknown to the Magliozzis in advance as "that would entail researching the right answer, which is what? ... Work."

=== Features ===
The show originally consisted of two segments with a break in between but was changed to three segments. After the shift to the three-segment format, it became a running joke to refer to the last segment as "the third half" of the program.

The show opened with a short comedy segment, typically jokes sent in by listeners, followed by eight call-in sessions. The hosts ran a contest called the "Puzzler", in which a riddle, sometimes car-related, was presented. The answer to the previous week's "Puzzler" was given at the beginning of the "second half" of the show, and a new "Puzzler" was given at the start of the "third half". The hosts gave instructions to listeners to write answers addressed to "Puzzler Tower" on some non-existent or expensive object, such as a "$26 bill" or an advanced DSLR camera. This gag initially started as suggestions that the answers be written "on the back of a $20 bill". A running gag concerned Tom's inability to remember the previous week's "Puzzler" without heavy prompting from Ray. During a tribute show following Tom's death in 2014 due to complications of Alzheimer's disease, Ray joked, "I guess he wasn't joking about not being able to remember the puzzler all those years." For each puzzler, one correct answer was chosen at random, with the winner receiving a $26 gift certificate to the Car Talk store, referred to as the "Shameless Commerce Division". It was originally $25, but was increased for inflation after a few years. Originally, the winner received a specific item from the store, but it soon changed to a gift certificate to allow the winner to choose the item they wanted (though Tom often made an item suggestion).

A recurring feature was "Stump the Chumps," in which the hosts revisited a caller from a previous show to determine the accuracy and the effect, if any, of their advice. A similar feature began in May 2001, "Where Are They Now, Tommy?" It began with a comical musical theme with a sputtering, backfiring car engine and a horn as a backdrop. Tom then announced who the previous caller was, followed by a short replay of the essence of the previous call, preceded and followed by harp music often used in other audiovisual media to indicate recalling and returning from a dream. The hosts then greeted the previous caller, confirmed that they had not spoken since their previous appearance and asked them if there had been any influences on the answer they were about to relate, such as arcane bribes by the NPR staff. The repair story was then discussed, followed by a fanfare and applause if the Tappet Brothers' diagnosis was correct, or a wah-wah-wah music piece mixed with a car starter operated by a weak battery (an engine which would not start) if the diagnosis was wrong. The hosts then thanked the caller for their return appearance.

The brothers also had an official Animal-Vehicle Biologist and Wildlife Guru named Kieran Lindsey. She answered questions like "How do I remove a snake from my car?" and offered advice on how those living in cities and suburbs could reconnect with wildlife. They also would sometimes rely on Harvard University professors Wolfgang Rueckner and Jim E. Davis for questions concerning physics and chemistry, respectively.

There were numerous appearances from NPR personalities, including Bob Edwards, Susan Stamberg, Scott Simon, Ray Suarez, Will Shortz, Sylvia Poggioli, and commentator and author Daniel Pinkwater. On one occasion, the show featured Martha Stewart as an in-studio guest, whom the Magliozzis twice during the segment referred to as "Margaret". Celebrities and public figures were featured as "callers" as well, including Geena Davis, Ashley Judd, Morley Safer, Gordon Elliott, former Major League Baseball pitcher Bill Lee, journalist Farhad Manjoo, and astronaut John M. Grunsfeld.

==== Space program calls ====
Astronaut and engineer John Grunsfeld called into the show during Space Shuttle mission STS-81 in January 1997, in which Atlantis docked to the Mir space station. In this call he complained about the performance of his serial-numbered, Rockwell-manufactured "government van". To wit, it would run very loud and rough for about two minutes, quieter and smoother for another six and a half, and then the engine would stop with a jolt. He went on to state that the brakes of the vehicle, when applied, would glow red-hot, and that the vehicle's odometer displayed "about 60 million miles". This created some consternation for the hosts, until they noticed the audio of Grunsfeld's voice, being relayed from Mir via TDRS satellite, sounded similar to that of Tom Hanks in the then-recent film Apollo 13, after which they realized the call was from space and the government van in question was, in fact, the Space Shuttle.

In addition to the on-orbit call, the Brothers once received a call asking advice on winterizing an electric car. When they asked what kind of car, the caller stated it was a "kit car", a $400 million "kit car". It was a joke call from NASA's Jet Propulsion Laboratory concerning the preparation of the Mars Opportunity rover for the oncoming Martian winter, during which temperatures drop to several hundred degrees below freezing.

Click and Clack have also been featured in editorial cartoons, including one where a befuddled NASA engineer called them to ask how to fix the Space Shuttle.

=== Humor ===
Humor and wisecracking pervaded the program. Tom and Ray are known for their self-deprecating humor, often joking about the supposedly poor quality of their advice and the show in general. They also commented at the end of each show: "Well, it's happened again—you've wasted another perfectly good hour listening to Car Talk."

The phrase "our fair city" was introduced during a puzzler segment on the radio show. Ray presented a puzzler involving a well-dressed man who referred to a city as "your fair city." Tom found the phrase amusing and began using it humorously to refer to Cambridge, Massachusetts, where the show was based. This playful reference quickly became a running joke on the show, with the hosts frequently referring to Cambridge as "our fair city" in subsequent episodes.

The ending credits of the show started with thanks to the colorfully nicknamed actual staffers: producer Doug "the subway fugitive, not a slave to fashion, bongo boy frogman" Berman; "John 'Bugsy' Lawlor, just back from the ..." every week a different eating event with rhyming foodstuff names; David "Calves of Belleville" Greene; Catherine "Frau Blücher" Fenollosa, whose name caused a horse to neigh and gallop (an allusion to a running gag in the movie Young Frankenstein); and Carly "High Voltage" Nix, among others. Following the real staff was a lengthy list of pun-filled fictional staffers and sponsors such as statistician Marge Innovera ("margin of error"), customer care representative Haywood Jabuzoff ("Hey, would ya buzz off"), meteorologist Claudio Vernight ("cloudy overnight"), optometric firm C. F. Eye Care ("see if I care"), Russian chauffeur Picov Andropov ("pick up and drop off"), Leo Tolstoy biographer Warren Peace ("War and Peace"), hygiene officer and chief of the Tokyo office Oteka Shawa ("oh, take a shower"), Swedish snowboard instructor Soren Derkeister ("sore in the keister"), law firm Dewey, Cheetham & Howe ("Do we cheat 'em? And how!"), Greek tailor Euripides Eumenades ("You rip-a these, you mend-a these"), cloakroom attendant Mahatma Coate ("My hat, my coat"), seat cushion tester Mike Easter (my keister) and many, many others, usually concluding with Erasmus B. Dragon ("Her ass must be draggin'"), whose job title varied, but who was often said to be head of the show's working mothers' support group. They sometimes advised that "our chief counsel from the law firm of Dewey, Cheetham, & Howe is Hugh Louis Dewey, known to a group of people in Harvard Square as Huey Louie Dewey." (Huey, Louie, and Dewey were the juvenile nephews being raised by Donald Duck in Walt Disney's Comics and Stories.) Guest accommodations were provided by The Horseshoe Road Inn ("the horse you rode in").

At the end of the show, Ray warns the audience, "Don't drive like my brother!" to which Tom replies, "And don't drive like my brother!" The original tag line was "Don't drive like a knucklehead!" There were variations such as, "Don't drive like my brother ..." "And don't drive like his brother!" and "Don't drive like my sister ..." "And don't drive like my sister!" The tagline was heard in the Pixar film Cars, in which Tom and Ray voiced anthropomorphized vehicles (Rusty and Dusty Rust-eze, respectively a 1963 Dodge Dart and 1963 Dodge A100 van, as Lightning McQueen's racing sponsors) with personalities similar to their own on-air personae. Tom notoriously once owned a "convertible, green with large areas of rust!" Dodge Dart, known jokingly on the program by the faux-elegant name "Dartre".

== History ==
In 1977, radio station WBUR-FM in Boston scheduled a panel of local car mechanics to discuss car repairs on one of its programs, but only Tom Magliozzi showed up. He did so well that he was asked to return as a guest, and he invited his younger brother Ray (who was actually more of a car repair expert) to join him. The brothers were soon asked to host their own radio show on WBUR, which they continued to do every week. In 1986, NPR decided to distribute their show nationally.

In 1989, the brothers started a newspaper column Click and Clack Talk Cars which, like the radio show, mixed serious advice with humor. King Features distributes the column. Ray Magliozzi continues to write the column, retitled Car Talk, after his brother's death in 2014, knowing he would have wanted the advice and humor to continue.

In 1992, Car Talk won a Peabody Award, saying "Each week, master mechanics Tom and Ray Magliozzi provide useful information about preserving and protecting our cars. But the real core of this program is what it tells us about human mechanics ... The insight and laughter provided by Messrs. Magliozzi, in conjunction with their producer Doug Berman, provide a weekly mental tune-up for a vast and ever-growing public radio audience."

In 2005, Tom and Ray Magliozzi founded the Car Talk Vehicle Donation Program, "as a way to give back to the stations that were our friends and partners for decades — and whose programs we listen to every day." Since the Car Talk Vehicle Donation Program was founded, over 40,000 vehicles have been donated to support local NPR stations and programs, with over $40 million donated. Approximately 70% of the proceeds generated go directly toward funding local NPR affiliates and programs.

As of 2012, it had 3.3 million listeners each week, on about 660 stations. On June 8, 2012, the brothers announced that they would no longer broadcast new episodes as of October. Executive producer Doug Berman said the best material from 25 years of past shows would be used to put together "repurposed" shows for NPR to broadcast. Berman estimated the archives contain enough for eight years' worth of material before anything would have to be repeated. Ray Magliozzi, however, would occasionally record new taglines and sponsor announcements that were aired at the end of the show.

The show was inducted into the National Radio Hall of Fame in 2014.

Ray Magliozzi hosted a special Car Talk memorial episode for his brother Tom after he died in November 2014.

The Best of Car Talk episodes ended their weekly broadcast on NPR on September 30, 2017, although past episodes would continue availability online and via podcasts. 120 of the 400 stations intended to continue airing the show. NPR announced one option for the time slot would be their new news-talk program It's Been a Minute.

On June 11, 2021, it was announced that radio distribution of Car Talk would officially end on October 1, 2021, and that NPR would begin distribution of a twice-weekly podcast that will be 35–40 minutes in length and include early versions of every show, in sequential order.

In 2025 Ray Magliozzi began answering questions on a version of Car Talk called Car Talk+.

== Hosts ==
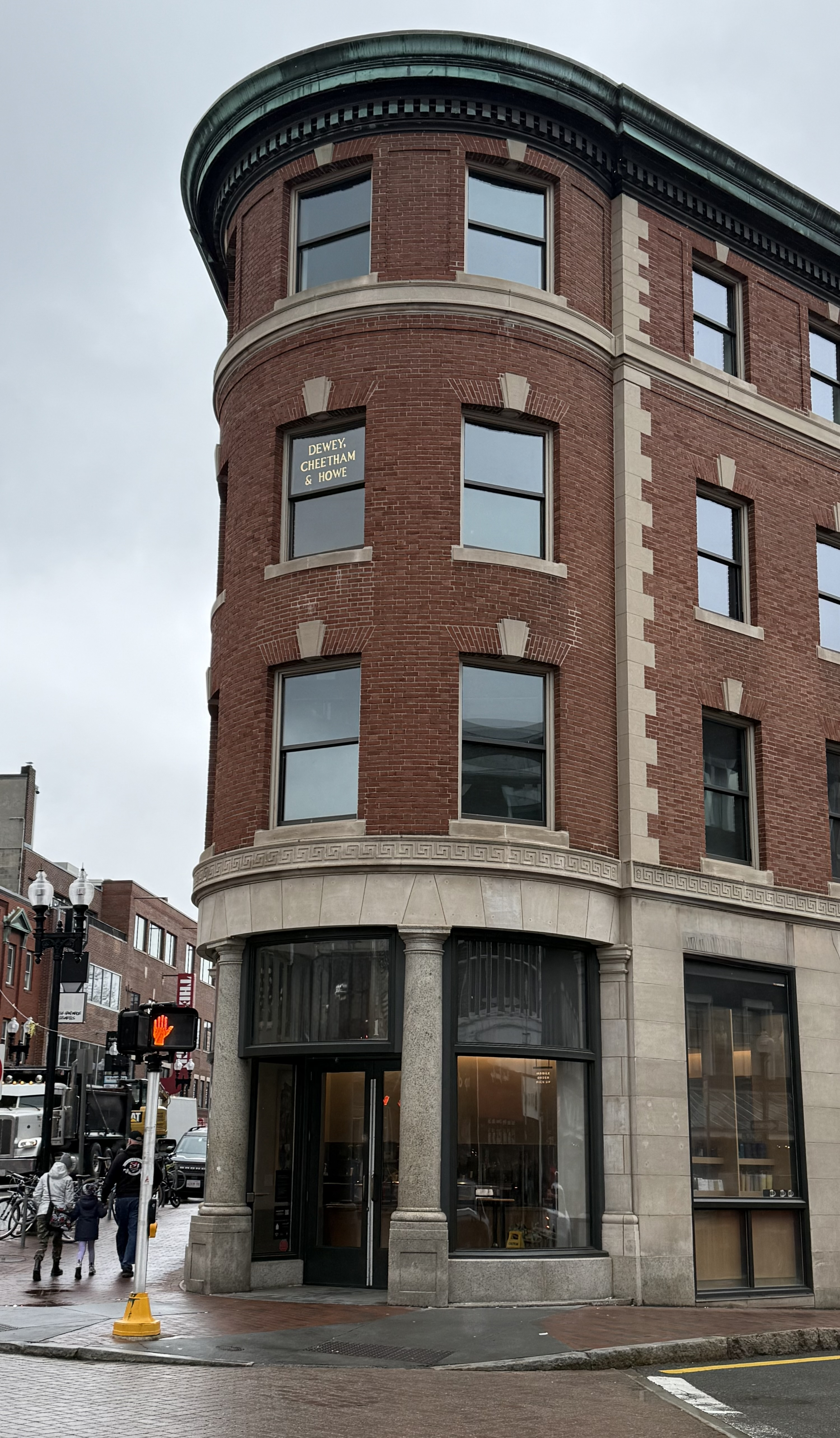
The name of the DC&H corporate offices is visible on the third-floor window above the corner of Brattle and JFK Streets, in Harvard Square, Cambridge, Massachusetts.

The Magliozzis were long-time auto mechanics. Ray Magliozzi has a Bachelor of Science degree in humanities and science from MIT, while Tom had a Bachelor of Science degree in economics from MIT, an MBA from Northeastern University, and a DBA from the Boston University School of Management.

The Magliozzis operated a do-it-yourself garage together in the 1970s which became more of a conventional repair shop in the 1980s. Ray continued to have a hand in the day-to-day operations of the shop for years, while his brother Tom semi-retired, often joking on Car Talk about his distaste for doing "actual work". The show's offices were located near their shop at the corner of JFK Street and Brattle Street in Harvard Square, marked as "Dewey, Cheetham & Howe", the imaginary law firm to which they referred on-air. DC&H doubled as the business name of Tappet Brothers Associates, the corporation established to manage the business end of Car Talk. Initially a joke, the company was incorporated after the show expanded from a single station to national syndication.

The two were commencement speakers at MIT in 1999.

Executive producer Doug Berman said in 2012, "The guys are culturally right up there with Mark Twain and the Marx Brothers. They will stand the test of time. People will still be enjoying them years from now. They're that good."

Tom Magliozzi died on November 3, 2014, at age 77, due to complications from Alzheimer's disease.

== Adaptations ==
The show was the inspiration for the short-lived The George Wendt Show, which briefly aired on CBS in the 1994–1995 season as a mid-season replacement.

In July 2007, PBS announced that it had green-lit an animated adaptation of Car Talk, to air on prime-time in 2008. The show, titled Click and Clack's As the Wrench Turns, is based on the adventures of the fictional "Click and Clack" brothers' garage at "Car Talk Plaza". The ten episodes aired in July and August 2008.

Car Talk: The Musical!!! was written and directed by Wesley Savick, and composed by Michael Wartofsky. The adaptation was presented by Suffolk University, and opened on March 31, 2011, at the Modern Theatre in Boston, Massachusetts. The play was not officially endorsed by the Magliozzis, but they participated in the production, lending their voices to a central puppet character named "The Wizard of Cahs".
