= Spiritual Appliances =

Studio album by Sara Hickman
- Released: February 22, 2000
- Genre: Folk/Pop
- Length: 61:56
- Label: Shanachie
- Producer: Sara Hickman

Sara Hickman chronology
Two Kinds of Laughter (1998)	Spiritual Appliances (2000)

Spiritual Appliances is an album by the American singer-songwriter Sara Hickman, released in 2000.

== Production ==
The album was produced by Hickman. It was recorded in Austin, Texas.

== Critical reception ==
Professional ratings
Review scores
Source	Rating
AllMusic	3/5 stars
The Encyclopedia of Popular Music	3/5 stars

The Austin Chronicle wrote that "there are songs built from the basic beginnings of an acoustic guitar and the singer singing sweetly that end in a near roar, while other tunes lead a chorus of whistlers through a pleasant bit of sentimentality and later, even a lush string section." Exclaim! thought that "all 13 tracks of the bright, airy, jangle pop have a rootsy edge and are full of memorable hooks." The Boston Globe wrote that the "singer-guitarist keeps her wry edge for most of the 13 songs on her self-produced album, rarely lapsing into the too sweet, too poignant, or too gooey."

== Track listing ==
1. "Standing Ground" (Sara Hickman) – 3:39
2. "Life" (Sara Hickman) – 4:04
3. "Kerosene" (Sara Hickman, Nick Trevisick) – 4:47
4. "Edward" (Sara Hickman, Danny Levin) – 4:02
5. "Woman Waiting to Happen" (Sara Hickman, Barbara K) – 6:43
6. "I Wish I Could Run" (Sara Hickman) – 4:08
7. "Everything's Red" (Sara Hickman, David Bassett) – 6:35
8. "Dear Tracy" (Sara Hickman) – 2:49
9. "Moment of Grace" (Sara Hickman) – 7:29
10. "Bowl Full of Stars" (Sara Hickman) – 3:48
11. "Come Around" (Barbara K) – 3:49
12. "We Are Each Other's Angels" (Chuck Brodsky, additional words by Sara Hickman) – 5:53
13. "I'm Not Going Anywhere" (Sara Hickman, Wendy Waldman) – 4:10

== Personnel ==
- Sara Hickman – guitar, vocals
- Jon Blondell – trombone
- Daryl Burgee – tambourine
- Javier Chaparro – violin, vocals
- Michael Doane – bass guitar
- Chip Dolan – piano, keyboards, didgeridoo, vocals
- Tish Hinojosa – vocals
- Glenn Kawamoto – bass guitar
- Lloyd Maines – pedal steel
- Mitch Marine – drums
- John Mills – clarinet, flute, saxophone
- Julie Noble – vocals
- Riley Osbourne – organ
- Paul Pearcy – percussion, drums
- Gary Slechta – trumpet
- Will Taylor – viola
- Andy Timmons – guitar
- Todd V. Wolfson – vocals

Production

- Producers: Sara Hickman
- Engineers: Marty Lester, Fred Remmert
- Assistant engineer: George Morgan
- Mixing: John Anthony, Sara Hickman, Fred Remmert
- Arranger: Sara Hickman
- Horn arrangements: John Mills
- String arrangements: Will Taylor
- Design: Neil Ferguson
- Photography: Todd V. Wolfson
