= Shortstop (album) =

Studio album by Sara Hickman
- Released: 1990
- Recorded: Summer 1990
- Studio: Powertrax, Hollywood, California
- Genre: Adult contemporary
- Length: 55:05
- Label: Elektra
- Producer: Sara Hickman, David Kershenbaum

Sara Hickman chronology
Equal Scary People (1989)	Shortstop (1990)	Necessary Angels (1994)

Shortstop is the second album by the American singer-songwriter Sara Hickman, released in 1990.

== Critical reception ==
Professional ratings
Review scores
Source	Rating
AllMusic	4.5/5 stars
The Encyclopedia of Popular Music	4/5 stars
Entertainment Weekly	B
The Rolling Stone Album Guide	3/5 stars

Trouser Press called the album a "sleek commercial effort," writing that Hickman "rises to the challenge with exquisite vocal control and clever, inventive songs on such diverse topics as Salvador Dali, American hostages, sisterly love and the foibles of male sexuality."

== Release ==
"I Couldn't Help Myself" was an adult contemporary hit. Shortstop was Hickman's sole album for Elektra; she was dropped after its release, in part, because she did not include her Arachnophobia soundtrack song, "Blue Eyes Are Sensitive to the Light."

== Track listing ==
No.	Title	Writer(s)	Length
1.	"In the Fields"	Sara Hickman	4:37
2.	"Shortstop"	Sara Hickman	4:38
3.	"Aurora"	Sara Hickman	6:07
4.	"I Couldn't Help Myself"	Sara Hickman; Debbie Talasek	5:26
5.	"If We Sent Our Hearts over Now"	Sara Hickman	4:56
6.	"The Very Thing"	Sara Hickman; Sandy Abernathy	4:38
7.	"Salvador"	Sara Hickman	4:50
8.	"Don't Give Up"	Sara Hickman	4:47
9.	"Too Fast"	Sara Hickman	3:54
10.	"Claim on My Heart"	Sara Hickman	4:06
11.	"Take It Like a Man"	Sara Hickman	7:06
12.	"Little Blue Man"	Sara Hickman	1:07
Total length:			56:20

- Track 12 is not listed on the back cover.

== Personnel ==
- Sara Hickman – acoustic guitar, guitar, vocals, background vocals, classical guitar
- Gerald Albright – saxophone
- Paulinho Da Costa – percussion
- Chris Douridas – background vocals
- Dan Dugmore – pedal steel
- Denny Fongheiser – drums
- James Harrah – electric guitar
- Randy "The Emperor" Jackson – bass guitar
- Dennis Karmazyn – cello
- David Kershenbaum – background vocals
- Brian Kilgore – percussion
- Larry Klein – bass guitar, fretless bass
- Abraham Laboriel – bass guitar
- Nick Lane – trombone
- Ricky Lawson – drums
- David Lindley – mandolin
- Steve Madaio – trumpet
- Alton McHerrin – background vocals
- Brad McLemore – classical guitar
- John Melliwell – clarinet
- Phil Parlapiano – organ
- Tim Pierce – electric guitar
- Ian Ritchie – tenor saxophone
- Phil Shenale – organ, string section, keyboards, tin whistle
- Elaine Summers – background vocals
- Esther Terry – background vocals
- David Woodord – flute, tenor saxophone
- Boys choir (aka "the popcorn kids") on "Salvador"
  - Ben McCrary
  - Charles McCrary
  - Quincy McCrary
  - Chad Duno
  - Kenny Ford
- The Rose Banks Choir on "Take It Like a Man"
  - Alfie Silas
  - Rose Stone
  - Pattie Howard
  - Howard McCrary
  - Perry Morgan

Production

- Producers: Sara Hickman, David Kershenbaum
- Engineers: Marc DeSisto, Paul McKenna
- Assistant engineer: Al Phillips
- Arranger: Sara Hickman
- Horn arrangements: Sara Hickman, Ian Ritchie
- Choir arrangement: Charity McCrary, Alfie Silas, Rose Stone
- Art direction: Sara Hickman, Tiffany Shope
- Design: Sara Hickman, Tiffany Shope
- Set painting: Kelly Stribling
