= Brave Combo =

American polka/rock/worldbeat band

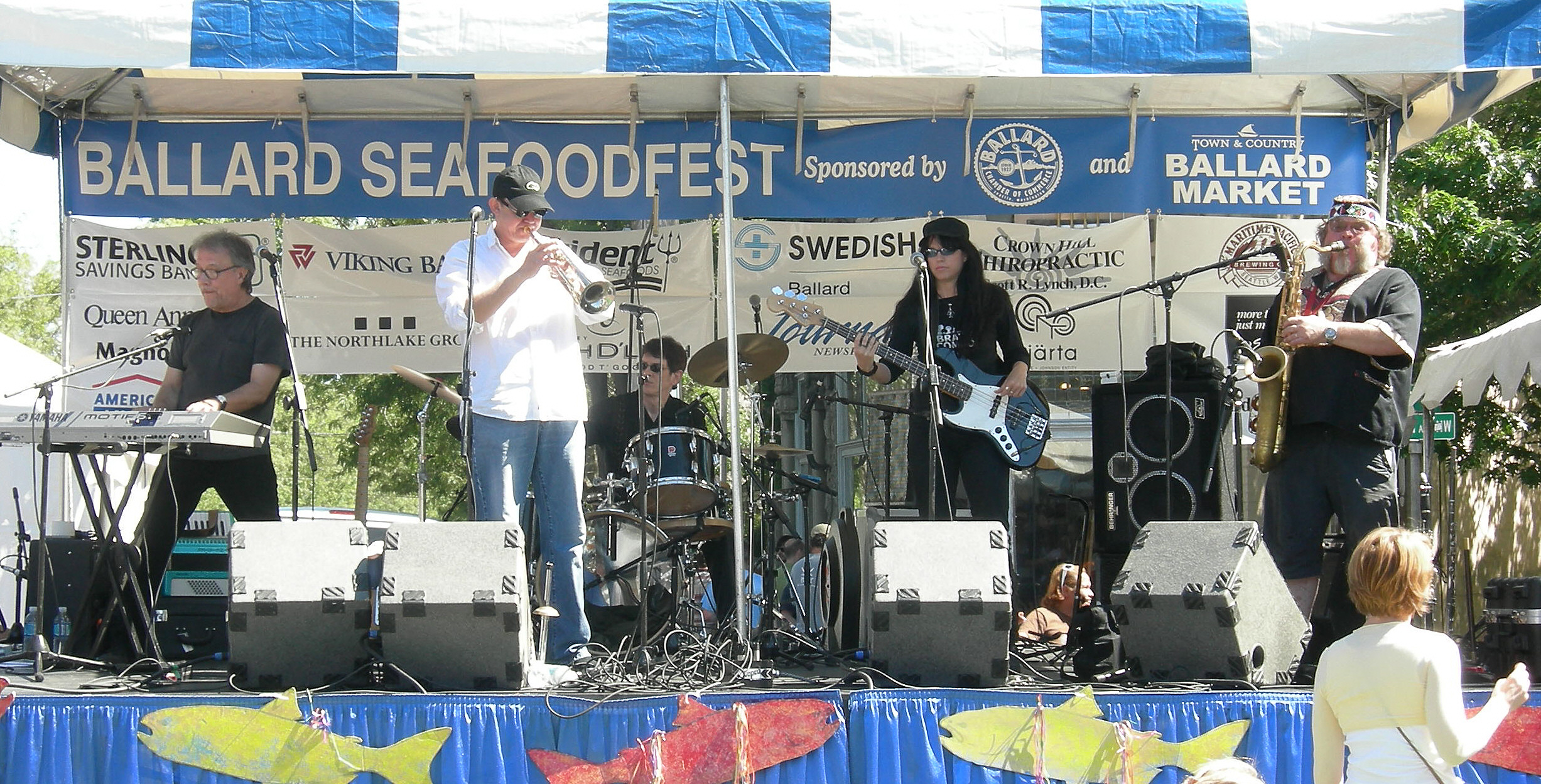
- Brave Combo at the Ballard Seafood Fest

Background information
- Origin: Denton, Texas
- Genres: Polka rock, polka fusion, alternative rock, folk rock, Tex-Mex, salsa, Latin rock, ska, dance rock
- Years active: 1979–present
- Labels: Four Dots, Rounder, DenTone, Cleveland International
- Members: Carl Finch; Carl Kleinsteuber; Dave Monsch; Alan Emert; Robert Hokamp; Jeffrey Barnes
- Past members: Ginny Mac; Little Jack Melody; Dave Cameron; Tim Walsh; Lyle Atkinson; Bubba Hernandez; Joseph Cripps; Mitch Marine; Paul Stivitts; Ann Marie Harrop; Arjuna Contreras
- Website: bravecombo.com

Brave Combo is a polka rock band based in Denton, Texas. Founded in 1979 by guitarist/keyboardist/accordionist Carl Finch, they have been a prominent fixture in the Texas music scene for more than thirty-five years. Their music, both originals and covers, incorporates a number of dance styles, mostly polka, but also some Latin American and Caribbean styles like norteño, salsa, rumba, cha-cha-cha, choro, samba, two-step, cumbia, charanga, merengue, ska, etc, all performed with a rock/worldbeat energy.

As part of their perceived artistic mission to expand the musical tastes of their listeners, they have often played and recorded covers of well-known songs in a style radically different from the original versions. Examples include polka versions of Jimi Hendrix's "Purple Haze" and the Doors' "People are Strange", the Rolling Stones' "(I Can't Get No) Satisfaction" as a cha-cha, and "Sixteen Tons" as a cumbia.

== History and influences ==
In a 1995 feature in The Santa Fe New Mexican, band cofounder Carl Finch described Brave Combo's influence as a polka band with rock styles as an earnest way to escape an increasingly corporate cultural landscape, lamenting-

'Rock had been removed from the common people' he said 'and musically I wanted what I do to have depth, I started listening to polka and ethnic records I'd find at Target six for $5 — nothing could beat that. At first, I’d just buy whatever covers looked strangest but after a while I’d do research and find out what was good.' Among the best, he soon discovered, were names like Larry Chesky and his big band polka sound, Norwegian accordion virtuoso Andrew Walter (“exciting intense” is Finch’s assessment), and Eddie Blazonczyk, the “Godfather” of Chicago’s Polish community. 'All this came out of a sense of desperation'.

Brave Combo had its website at brave.com/bo, a domain hack. The domain name brave.com was purchased in 1995 by a fan of the band, who transferred it to the band in 1997. In mid-2010s, Finch sold the domain to Brave Software, which develops the web browser Brave, in exchange for bravecombo.com, which had been taken by a squatter, and an undisclosed sum of money.

== Awards and honors ==
They won a Grammy Award in 1999 in the Best Polka Album category for their album Polkasonic, and again in 2004 for their album Let's Kiss.

In naming Denton, Texas, the "Best Music Scene" for 2008, Paste magazine cited Brave Combo as the "Grand Pooh-Bah of Denton bands" and said that "Brave Combo, is in many ways the template from which all the rest are cut: eclectic and artistically ambitious, with a high degree of musicianship and a strong DIY ethic."

== Media appearances ==
Brave Combo on The Simpsons

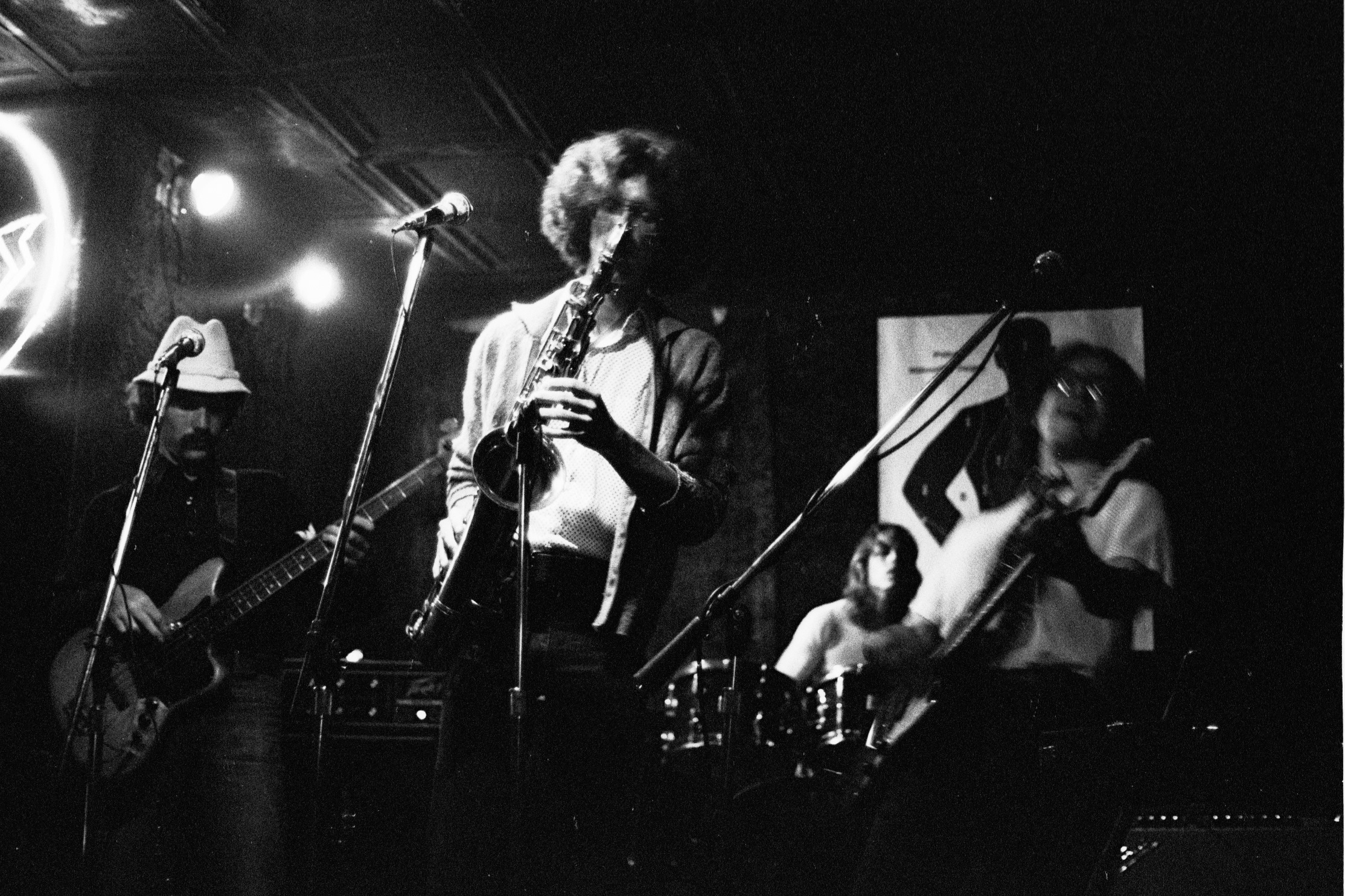
- Brave Combo performs at Zero's nightclub in Fort Worth, Texas. October, 1980.
  The band made a short appearance, as animated figures, on the March 21, 2004, episode of The Simpsons ("Co-Dependents' Day"). Series creator Matt Groening is a fan of the band and they appeared on the show at his personal request. In the episode, the band played a new original song called "Fill The Stein" and their version of "The Simpsons Theme" played over the closing credits.
- Finch and other band members made cameo appearances in Talking Heads leader David Byrne's 1986 movie True Stories, set in fictional Virgil, Texas. Finch can be spotted in the fashion show sporting a brick-patterned suit and in the parade leading the all-accordion marching band. (In real life, Brave Combo was David Byrne's wedding band.)
- They appear in the 1986 Hank Wangford Channel 4 television series The A to Z of C & W singing the Hank Williams song "Cold, Cold Heart".
- They contributed two songs to the Gumby album, released in 1989.
- Their song "Busy Office Rhumba" was used as the theme for the 1993 Fox television series Bakersfield P.D.
- They appear as a wedding band in the 1995 feature film Late Bloomers.
- In 1997, the band performed the theme song for the animated Cyboars pilot from Funimation.
- In 2000, they appeared on the national telecast of the MDA Labor Day Telethon with Jerry Lewis dancing along to the music.
- They wrote and performed the theme song for the 2005 series "ESPN Bowling Night".
- The opening theme and other music for the 2008 PBS animated series Click and Clack's As the Wrench Turns were produced by Carl Finch and composed, arranged, and performed by Finch and Brave Combo.
- Their live music video, "The Denton Polka", appears on the Bohemia Rising DVD Compilation (released in 2009), a collection of documentary shorts directed by Christopher Largen exploring rebellion and resistance to corporate demolition in their hometown of Denton, Texas.
- Included in Bob Dylan's 2009 Christmas release, Christmas In The Heart, the song "Must Be Santa", is performed polka-style. Dylan's arrangement is almost identical to the Brave Combo arrangement from their 1991 CD It's Christmas, Man!. In an interview published by Street News Service, Dylan acknowledged the influence of Brave Combo: "This version comes from a band called Brave Combo. Somebody sent their record to us for our radio show. They’re a regional band out of Texas that takes regular songs and changes the way you think about them. You oughta hear their version of 'Hey Jude'."
- They were featured on Bowling for Soup's album Sorry for Partyin', playing a polka version of Bowling For Soup's song "Belgium".
- The season seven episode "Fun on a Bun" of the animated science fiction comedy Futurama includes two original songs by the band plus a cover version of "The Chicken Dance". The episode debuted August 1, 2012, on Comedy Central.
- The season ten episode "Bar Wars V: The Final Judgment" of the NBC sitcom comedy Cheers features Sam’s rival Gary pranking the bar on Halloween by rigging Cheers’ jukebox, telephone and even the bar’s soda gun to play the Combo song ‘Vampire Twist’ when being used.

== Discography ==
=== US studio and live albums ===
| Date of release | Title | Label | Catalog | Type | Notes |
|---|---|---|---|---|---|
| 1979 | Polkamania | Four Dots | FD1003 & FD1004 | Studio | released as two 7" discs |
| 1981 | Music For Squares | Four Dots | FD1005 | Studio | |
| 1982 | Urban Grown-ups | Four Dots | FD1006 | Studio | four song EP |
| 1982 | Originals | Four Dots | | Studio | released as cassette only |
| 1984 | World Dance Music | Four Dots | FD1010 | Studio | |
| 1984 | No Sad Faces | Four Dots | FD1012 | Live | |
| 1987 | Musical Varieties | Rounder | CD 11546 | Studio | compilation from Four Dots releases plus two new tracks |
| 1987 | Polkatharsis | Rounder | CD 9009 | Studio | |
| 1988 | Humansville | Rounder | CD 9019 | Studio | |
| 1990 | A Night On Earth | Rounder | CD 9029 | Studio | |
| 1992 | It's Christmas, Man! | Rounder | CD 3099 | Studio | contents similar to It's X-mas, Man! |
| 1993 | No, No, No, Cha Cha Cha | Rounder | CD 9035 | Studio | content similar to Japanese release |
| 1994 | The Hokey Pokey: Organized Dancing | DenTone | DT 1001 | Studio | seven-song EP |
| 1995 | Polkas for a Gloomy World | Rounder | CD 9045 | Studio | Grammy nominee |
| 1996 | Girl | Rounder | CD 9050 | Studio | with Tiny Tim – his last recording |
| 1996 | Mood Swing Music | Rounder | CD 11574 | Studio | rarities and singles |
| 1996 | Kiss Of Fire | Watermelon | WM 1058 | Studio | with Lauren Agnelli, content similar to Allumettes |
| 1997 | Group Dance Epidemic | Rounder | R9055 | Studio | |
| 1998 | Polka Party with Brave Combo: Live and Wild! | Easydisc | EDIS 7052 | Live | Grammy nominee |
| 1999 | Polkasonic | Cleveland International | CIR-1023-2 | Studio | Grammy winner |
| 2000 | The Process | Rounder Records | ROUN9065 | Studio | |
| 2001 | All Wound Up! – A Family Music Party | Rounder Records | ROUN8092 | Studio | with Cathy Fink & Marcy Marxer, Grammy nominee |
| 2001 | Kick-Ass Polkas | Cleveland International | B00005O7SE | Live | Grammy nominee |
| 2003 | Box of Ghosts | Rounder Records | ROUN9064 | Studio | |
| 2004 | Let's Kiss: 25th Anniversary Album | Dentone Records | | Studio | Grammy winner |
| 2005 | Holidays! | Dentone/Rounder | | Studio | |
| 2007 | Polka's Revenge | Dentone Records | | Studio | Grammy nominee |
| 2008 | The Exotic Rocking Life | Dentone Records | | Studio | |
| 2009 | Symphonic Polkas | Dentone Records | DT1006 | Live | with the Mesquite Symphony Orchestra |
| 2009 | Christmas Present | Dentone Records | DT1007 | Studio | Christmas music |
| 2010 | Kikiriki | Dentone Records | DT1008 | Studio | |
| 2012 | Sounds Of The Hollow | Dentone Records | DT1009 | Studio | |
| 2014 | Live at Blob's Park | Dentone Records | DT1012 | Live | |
| 2015 | The Liminal Zone | Dentone Records | DT1013 | Studio | |

=== International releases ===
| Date of release | Title | Label | Catalog | Type | Notes |
|---|---|---|---|---|---|
| 1981 | Music For Squares | Stunn | Stun507 | Studio | New Zealand, content identical to US release |
| 1981 | I Gotta Know/Neo Limbo | Stunn | BFA 884 | Studio | New Zealand, 7" single |
| 1986 | People Are Strange | Rogue Records | FMST 4007 | Studio | U.K. compilation |
| 1987 | Polkatharsis | Demon Records | REU 1018 | Studio | U.K., content identical to US release |
| 1989 | Music Circus | P-Vine | PCD-2513 | Studio | Japan |
| 1990 | Very Early Recordings | Wave Records | | Studio | Japan |
| 1991 | ÉÉjhanaika | P-Vine | PCD-1800 | Studio | Japan |
| 1991 | It's X-mas, Man! | P-Vine | PCD-2300 | Studio | Japan |
| 1992 | No, No, No, Cha Cha Cha | P-Vine | PCD-2400 | Studio | Japan |
| 1993 | Ondo Saves The World | Tele Disc | TLCD-93001 | Studio | Japan, Kikusuimaru Meets Brave Combo |
| 1994 | Allumettes | P-Vine | PCD-1986 | Studio | Japan, with Lauren Agnelli |
| 1995 | Polkas For A Gloomy World | P-Vine | PCD-3614 | Studio | Japan, content identical to U.S. release |

== Members ==
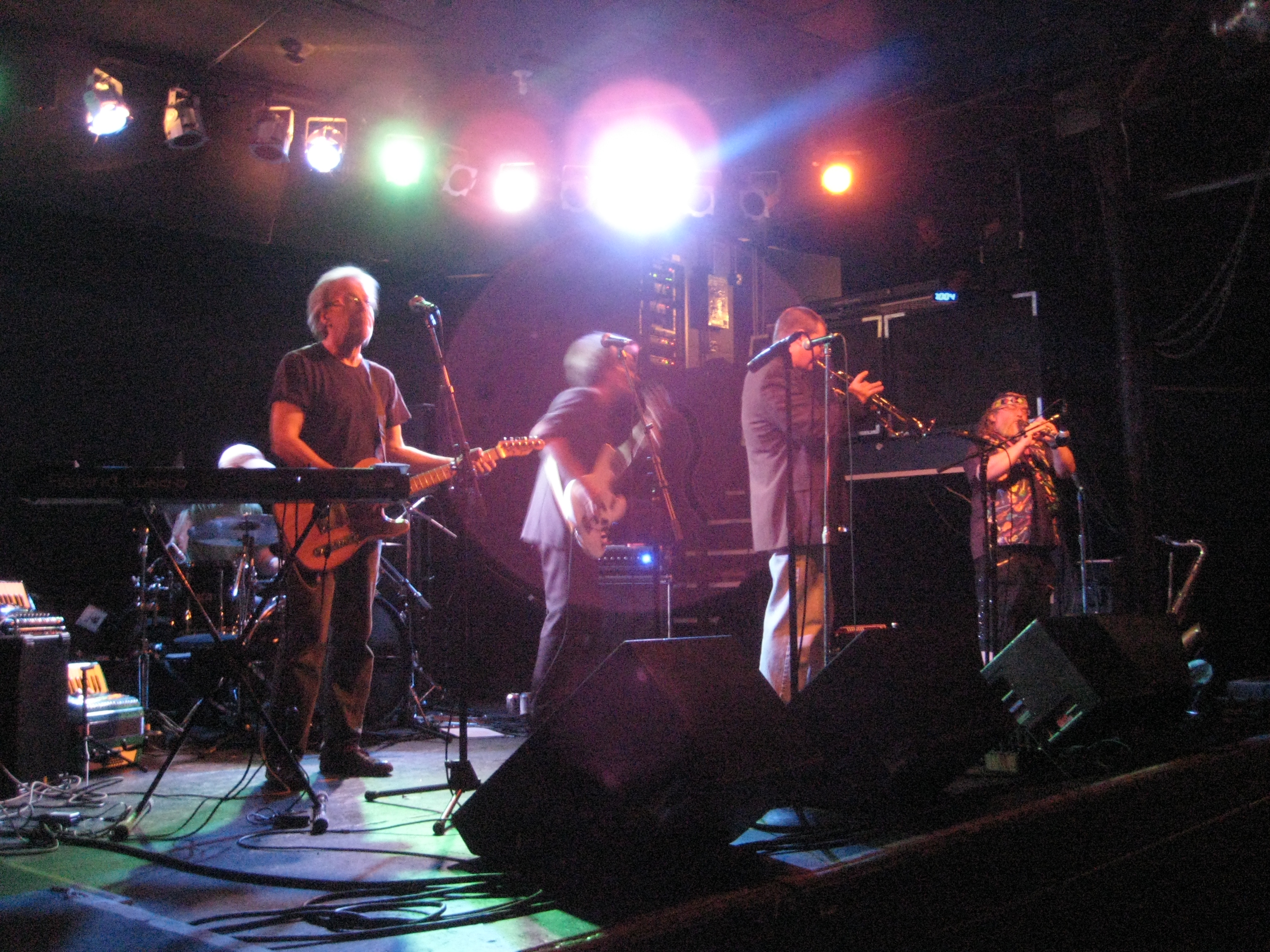
Brave Combo performing at Cat's Cradle in Carrboro, North Carolina

- Carl Finch – guitar, keyboards, accordion (born November 29, 1951, Texarkana, Arkansas) (1979–present)
- Lyle Atkinson – bass guitar, tuba (born October 23, 1953, Minneapolis, Minnesota) (1979–1985, 2015–present)
- Danny O'Brien – trumpet (born July 12, 1966, Lakenheath, England) (1993–present)
- Alan Emert – drums (born May 5, 1965) (1997–2008, 2010–present)
- Robert Hokamp – guitar, lap steel, cornet (2015–present)

=== Former members ===
- Jeffrey Barnes – saxophones, clarinet, flute, harmonica, penny whistles (born July 27, 1951, Fremont, Ohio) (1983–2015)
- Ginny Mac – accordion (2011–2013)
- Tim Walsh – saxophone, flute, clarinet (born c.1952) (1979–1983)
- Dave Cameron – drums (born c.1958) (1979–1983)
- Cenobio "Bubba" Hernandez – bass guitar (born November 30, 1958, San Antonio, Texas) (1985–2007)
- Phil Hernandez – drums (born February 5, 1971, Buffalo, New York) (1992 – ?)
- Mitch Marine – drums (born c.1961) (1983–1992)
- Joe Cripps – percussion (born January 5, 1965, Little Rock, Arkansas - missing, last seen October 19, 2016, Little Rock, Arkansas) (1992–1999), some subsequent performances
- Greg Beck – drums (1996–1997)
- Paul Stivitts – drums (born 1971) NYC
- Ann Marie Harrop – bass guitar (2007–2009)
- Little Jack Melody – bass guitar (2009–2014)
- Arjuna Contreras – drums (born August 11, 1974, Kenosha, Wisconsin) (2008–2010)
- Bill Tomlin – drums (born September 28, 1948)
