= Two Kinds of Laughter =

Two Kinds Of Laughter

Studio album by Sara Hickman
- Released: March 17, 1998
- Genre: Folk pop
- Length: 51:20
- Label: Shanachie
- Producer: Adrian Belew

Sara Hickman chronology
Misfits (1997)	Two Kinds Of Laughter (1998)	Spiritual Appliances (2000)

Two Kinds of Laughter is an album by the American singer-songwriter Sara Hickman, released in 1998.

== Critical reception ==
Professional ratings
Review scores
Source	Rating
AllMusic	4/5 stars

The Chicago Tribune thought that "Belew generally stays out of the way of Hickman's breezy, congenial folk-pop, keeping the focus on her achingly earnest lyrics and lithe, undemanding melodies."

AllMusic wrote that "Hickman creates an inviting tension in her songs, pitting unusual lyric lines against catchy melodies."

== Track listing ==
1. "Two Kinds of Laughter" (Hickman) – 4:30
2. "Take Whatever I Can Get" (Goldsen, Hickman) – 5:13
3. "I Wear the Crown" (Hickman, Trevisick) – 4:30
4. "Coolness by Mistake" (Brion, Hickman) – 3:30
5. "Eight" (Hickman) – 4:30
6. "Secret Family" (?, Hickman) – 3:26
7. "Look at It This Way" (Boyd, Hickman) – 3:40
8. "Optimistic Fool" (Hickman, Jacobsen) – 5:34
9. "One in Our Happiness" (Hickman, Lester) – 4:29
10. "E Cosi Desio Me Mena" (Hickman, Lester) – 2:46
11. "Comets over Costa Rica" (Hickman, Trevisick) – 5:47
12. "Let Go" (Tiven) – 3:25
