= Tom and Ray Magliozzi =

"Car Talk" radio show co-hosts

Tom Magliozzi
- Born: Thomas Louis Magliozzi; June 28, 1937; East Cambridge, Massachusetts, U.S.
- Died: November 3, 2014 (aged 77); Belmont, Massachusetts, U.S.
- Resting place: Mount Auburn Cemetery
- Other name: Clack
- Education: Economics Policy and Engineering, BS; Management: MBA, DBA
- Alma mater: Massachusetts Institute of Technology (1958); Northeastern University; Boston University (1989)
- Occupations: Radio show host, mechanic
- Years active: 1977–2012
- Known for: Co-host of Car Talk
- Spouse: Joanne
- Children: 3

Academic background
- Thesis: An empirical investigation of regression analysis meta-strategies for direct marketing list segmentation models (1989)
- Doctoral advisor: Paul D. Berger

Academic work
- Institutions: Boston University; Suffolk University
- Website: www.cartalk.com

Ray Magliozzi
- Born: Raymond Francis Magliozzi; March 30, 1949 (age 77); Cambridge, Massachusetts, U.S.
- Other name: Click
- Education: Bachelor of Science, Humanities
- Alma mater: Massachusetts Institute of Technology (1972)
- Occupations: Radio show host, mechanic
- Years active: 1977–2012, 2017–present
- Known for: Co-host of Car Talk
- Spouse: Monique
- Children: 2
- Website: www.cartalk.com

Thomas Louis Magliozzi (June 28, 1937 – November 3, 2014) and his brother Raymond Francis Magliozzi (born March 30, 1949) were the co-hosts of NPR's weekly radio show Car Talk, where they were known as "Click and Clack, the Tappet Brothers". Their show was honored with a Peabody Award in 1992, and the Magliozzis were both inducted into the National Radio Hall of Fame in 1998 and the Automotive Hall of Fame in 2018.

Tom died on November 3, 2014, aged 77, in Belmont, Massachusetts, of complications from Alzheimer's disease.

== Early life and education ==
Tom Magliozzi was born in East Cambridge, Massachusetts. His education was mostly in Cambridge: Gannett School, Wellington School, Cambridge Rindge and Latin School, and the Massachusetts Institute of Technology, where he graduated in 1958. While at MIT, he participated in Air Force ROTC, and subsequently spent six months in the Army Reserve.

Ray Magliozzi was born in Cambridge, Massachusetts twelve years after his brother Tom. Ray also graduated from MIT.

== Career ==
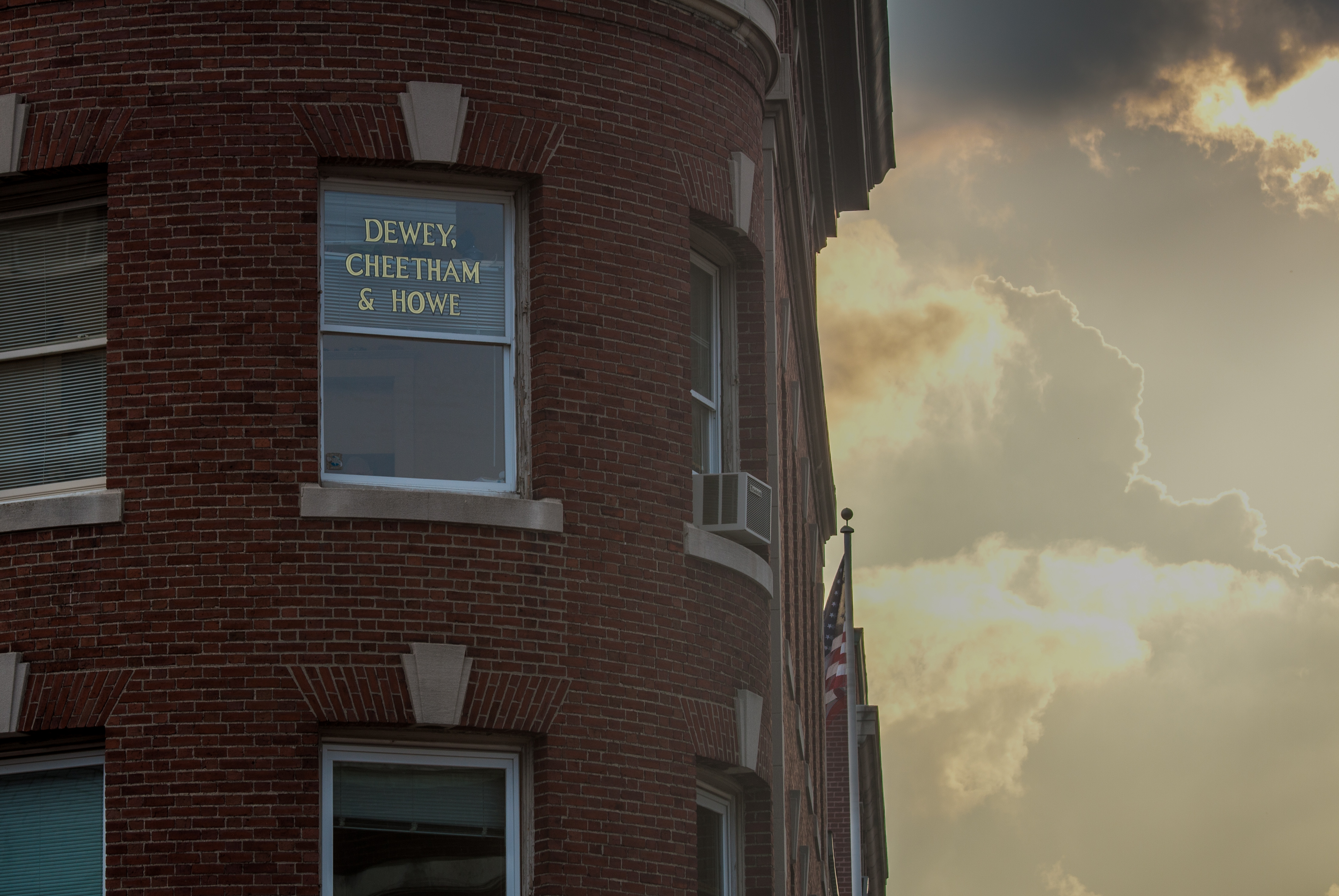
Harvard Square offices of "Dewey Cheetham and Howe", the show's headquarters (2012)

Tom earned a degree from the MIT Sloan School of Management. He worked for Sylvania's Semiconductor Division in Woburn, Massachusetts and then for the Foxboro Company while earning his MBA from Northeastern University and teaching part-time at local universities. He grew tired of his job and quit, spending the next year doing odd jobs such as painting for other tenants in his apartment building.

Ray taught science in Bennington, Vermont, for a few years before returning to Cambridge in 1973. He and Tom then opened a do-it-yourself auto repair shop named Hacker's Haven. The shop rented space and equipment to people who were trying to fix their own cars, but it was not profitable. Nevertheless, the two enjoyed the experience and were invited in 1977 to be part of a panel of automotive experts on Boston's National Public Radio affiliate WBUR-FM. Subsequently, the brothers converted the shop into a standard auto repair shop named the Good News Garage.

In addition to the local radio show, Tom worked a day or two each week at Technology Consulting Group started by Mike Brose, a former MIT classmate in Boston, and he still taught at local universities. Tom spent nine years working on the side while getting his doctorate in marketing from Boston University School of Management. After being a professor at Boston University and Suffolk University for eight years, he decided he disliked teaching and quit.

=== Car Talk ===
In January 1987, Susan Stamberg of Weekend Edition on NPR asked the two brothers to contribute weekly to her program. Nine months later, Car Talk premiered as an independent NPR program. In 1992, Tom and Ray won a Peabody Award for Car Talk for "distinguished achievement and meritorious public service". Tom and Ray continued to work in their repair garage while they produced Car Talk. On June 8, 2012, it was announced that Car Talk would stop producing new episodes in September 2012, though NPR would continue airing reruns of the show.

Producer Doug Berman said that Tom and Ray "changed public broadcasting forever" because the brothers "showed that real people are far more interesting than canned radio announcers." "The guys are culturally right up there with Mark Twain and the Marx Brothers."

=== Other work ===
In addition to the radio show, Tom wrote for CarTalk.com and ran his own consulting business. In 1999, the brothers returned to MIT to deliver a joint commencement speech to the graduates.

In 1989, the brothers started a newspaper column Click and Clack Talk Cars which, like the radio show, mixed serious advice with humor. King Features distributes the column. Ray continued to write the column, retitled Car Talk, after his brother's death in 2014, knowing he would have wanted the advice and humor to continue.

Tom and Ray both appeared in the Pixar films Cars (2006) and Cars 3 (2017). (Tom's role in the third film was accomplished through archival recordings, as it was produced after his death, while Ray reprised his role despite his retirement in 2012.) They played the owners of Rust-eze who discovered Lightning McQueen and gave him his first big break. Tom appeared as a 1963 Dodge Dart convertible, a reference to a car that he owned for many years and often mentioned on Car Talk. Ray appeared as a 1964 Dodge A100 van. In both films, they admonished: "Don't drive like my brother", the catchphrase from the close of their radio show.

The brothers also appeared in the sitcom Sabrina the Teenage Witch in an episode called "Driving Mr. Goodman" which aired on May 3, 2002. Sabrina calls them on a magical car radio for car advice. In the same year they appeared in the PBS Kids show Arthur episode called "Pick a Car, Any Car" which aired on November 25, 2002. Arthur calls them with a question about the family car, which would have been hauled away by the local mechanic without their help. The answer turns out to be a baby rattle lodged in the car's tailpipe. In 2008, the brothers starred in their own PBS animated series Click and Clack's As the Wrench Turns, playing fictionalized versions of themselves. They also hosted an episode of the PBS show NOVA entitled "The Car of the Future". Ray did radio and television ads for eBay Motors in 2022 and voiced the Father of the Bride in the animated short film The Ten Commandments of Banquet Serving in 2023.

== Filmography ==
=== Tom roles ===
Year	Title	Role	Notes
2001	Reading Rainbow	Narrator of New England Lighthouse	Episode: "My America: A Poetry Atlas of the United States"
2002	Sabrina the Teenage Witch	Himself	Episode: "Driving Mr. Goodman"
2002	Arthur	Himself	Episode: "Pick a Car, Any Car"
2006	Cars	Rusty Rust-eze	Voice
2017	Cars 3	Rusty Rust-eze	Voice, (final film role, archival recordings)

=== Ray roles ===
Year	Title	Role	Notes
2001	Reading Rainbow	Narrator of New England Lighthouse	Episode: "My America: A Poetry Atlas of the United States"
2002	Sabrina the Teenage Witch	Himself	Episode: "Driving Mr. Goodman"
2002	Arthur	Himself	Episode: "Pick a Car, Any Car"
2006	Cars	Dusty Rust-eze	Voice
2017	Cars 3	Dusty Rust-eze	Voice
2023	The Ten Commandments of Banquet Serving	Father of the Bride	Voice, animated short film
