= Polkas for a Gloomy World =

Studio album by Brave Combo
- Released: 1995
- Genre: Polka, Tejano music, Latin music
- Label: Rounder
- Producer: Brave Combo

Brave Combo chronology
The Hokey Pokey: Organized Dancing (1994)	Polkas for a Gloomy World (1995)	Girl (1996)

Polkas for a Gloomy World is an album by the American band Brave Combo, released in 1995. The band intended for it to be a return to their traditional polka fusion roots.

The album was nominated for a Grammy Award for "Best Polka Album".

== Production ==
The album was produced by Brave Combo. The songs are sung in English, as well as in Spanish, German, Russian, and Polish. "Flying Saucer" was inspired by frontman Carl Finch's observation of bizarre illuminations over Marfa, Texas; the standard "In Heaven, There Is No Beer" contains additional, original lyrics.

== Critical reception ==
Professional ratings
Review scores
Source	Rating
AllMusic	3/5 stars
The Encyclopedia of Popular Music	3/5 stars
MusicHound Rock: The Essential Album Guide	4/5 stars

The Washington Post wrote that the album "proves the polka can be every bit as invigorating as a Cajun two-step, another dance music rescued from wedding-reception hell." The Chicago Tribune stated that Brave Combo "plays Polish polkas and waltzes, German polkas, Czech drinking songs and conjunto and tejano tunes, or 'Mexican polkas'... With the exception of the waltzes, the music careens at breakneck speed."

The Sunday News determined that the album breaks down "snob barriers with a feel-good feast for the ears and feet." The Omaha World-Herald deemed it "a tasty mix of polka, country and blues—all with a hard-rock attitude." The Post-Tribune concluded that Polkas for a Gloomy World is "upbeat and silly—but really, you only need one Brave Combo album in your collection for novelty's sake." The Columbus Dispatch labeled it "a typical exotic mix of polka, norteno and tejano music"; the paper later named it one of the best albums of the year.

AllMusic called the album "a collection that finds the meeting place between Eastern Europe and the Tejano brand of accordion demolition music."

== Track listing ==
No.	Title	Length
1.	"Hosa Dyna"
2.	"Flying Saucer"
3.	"Eloina's Marbles"
4.	"The Faithful Hussar"
5.	"Near the Karpat Mountain"
6.	"Quiero Que Sepas"
7.	"Mystery Spot Polka"
8.	"Potato Chips Polka"
9.	"Breslau"
10.	"Pije Kuba"
11.	"Buscando Tu Curazon"
12.	"Katiusha"
13.	"Camino De Dolores"
14.	"In Heaven, There Is No Beer"
