= Sunfall Festival =

American indie rock band

- Origin: Provo, Utah, United States
- Genres: Indie rock
- Members: George H. Brunt - bass Amy Gileadi - vocals Scott Johnson - keyboards Christopher S. Peterson - drums Scott Wiley - guitars
- Website: www.sunfallfestival.com

Sunfall Festival was an indie rock band based in Provo, Utah and fronted by Amy Gileadi (Amy Greetham before her marriage) who, with drummer Chris Peterson and guitarist Scott Wiley, formed the core of the band. The bass position has been less stable; first filled by George Brunt, who later moved to New York for law school. After their second bass player moved to California, Brunt put law school on hold and returned to Provo to play with the band. A keyboarder named Scott Johnson was later added, but is often referred to as Dig Dug because "his name is scott, but we had a scott."

In 1999 the band was named one of the top 10 college bands of 1999 by Conan O'Brien.

In 2000 the band won GarageBand.com's seventh $250,000 recording contract on the basis of their song "I Walked Away"'s popularity with site members. However, the band never received this money (whether this is because GarageBand folded or because the band did not like the contract is not clear—the band has claimed both) and recorded the album Bang Bang Bang with their own money instead, although they were still able to work with producer Paul Fox.

Between "winning" the GarageBand money and recording Bang Bang Bang, the band released Monday 23, which album's quality recording and high-end packaging led to a common misconception that the band had used the $250,000 from GarageBand in that project.

The band's music had been used in radio ads for Plymouth.

The band had a long silence that coincided with the lead singer's pregnancy, but returned to playing live shows in October 2004.

In 2006, Sunfall Festival appeared on NPR's Open Mic

== Discography ==
- 1997: Absolutely Splendid
- 1998: On The Verge
- 2001: Monday 23
- 2001: 23b ("The sixteen songs on 23b range from DJ remixes of Monday 23 tracks, to live recordings and songs that just didn't quite fit onto Monday 23.")
- 2004: Bang Bang Bang

== Work also appears on ==
- 2000: GarageBand Records compilation
- 2000: A Timpanogos Christmas (as a contributing member of the Timpanogos Singer/Songwriter Alliance)
- 2001: Strictly Barefoot (as a contributing member of the Timpanogos Singer/Songwriter Alliance)
- 2001: Welcome to Brigham (a version of "Nearer, My God, To Thee" in response to Richard Dutcher's film Brigham City)
- 2002: a down tempo collection
- 2002: A Very Singles Christmas CD
