= Motherlode (Sara Hickman album) =

Studio album by Sara Hickman
- Released: 2006
- Studio: Congress House Studios, Austin, Texas
- Genre: Folk/pop
- Length: 43:06 (Disc 1), 44:26 (Disc 2)
- Label: Sleeveless
- Producer: Sara Hickman

Sara Hickman chronology
Faithful Heart	Motherlode

Professional ratings
Review scores
Source	Rating
AllMusic	3.5/5 stars

Motherlode is an album by American singer-songwriter Sara Hickman, released in 2006. It is her first double album.

== Track listing ==
=== The Mirror (Disc 1) ===
No.	Title	Length
1.	""A Song of You" (Hickman/Batteau)"	4:26
2.	""To a Maddening Ghost" (Hickman)"	5:07
3.	""Wagoner's Lad" (traditional)"	5:01
4.	""Living in Quiet Desperation" (Hickman/Hobizal)"	4:17
5.	""Mad World" (Orzabel)"	4:50
6.	""Twenty Years to Life" (Mitchell/Warden)"	3:52
7.	""Mother's Little Helper" (Jagger/Richards)"	3:56
8.	""Comfort's Sigh" (Hickman)"	4:24
9.	""My Mama's Hands" (Hickman)"	7:13
Total length:		43.10

=== The Thread (Disc 2) ===
1. "Birdhouse" (Hickman/Batteau) – 4:55
2. "Two Days Today" (Hickman) – 4:18
3. "Learn You Like a Book" (Boyd/Mitchell) – 4:04
4. "Are We Ever Gonna Have Sex Again?" (Rigby/Rich) – 3:16
5. "Stupid Love!" (Hickman/Parlapiano) – 4:06
6. "Good" (Meyers) – 4:43
7. "Enuf" (Addison/Singh) – 3:00
8. "Always a Saint" (Hudson) – 5:02
9. "Little Bird of Anger" (Ackerman) – 3:21
10. "This Too Will Pass" (Himmelman) – 3:50
11. "You Reward" (Cohen) – 3:51
