= Polka Party with Brave Combo: Live and Wild! =

Live album by Brave Combo
- Released: April 7, 1998
- Recorded: September 25–26, 1997
- Genre: Polka
- Length: 19:48
- Label: Easydisc
- Producer: Carl Finch and Brave Combo

Brave Combo chronology
Group Dance Epidemic (1997)	Polka Party with Brave Combo: Live and Wild! (1998)	Polkasonic (1999)

Professional ratings
Review scores
Source	Rating
Allmusic	3/5 stars

Polka Party with Brave Combo: Live and Wild! is an album by the American polka band Brave Combo, released through Easydisc on April 7, 1998. In 1999, the album was Brave Combo's first nomination for the Grammy Award for Best Polka Album. The album was recorded live at Sons of Hermann Hall in Dallas, Texas, on September 26, 1997, and at Rick's Place in Denton, Texas, on September 27, 1997. This was the second Grammy-nominated album by the Denton, Texas, based band.

== Track listing ==
1. "Pretty Dancing Girl" (Czech polka/traditional, arranged by Brave Combo)
2. "Hosa Dyna" (P.I. Wowarczyk/public domain)
3. "Turkish March" (Ludwig van Beethoven, arranged by Jeffrey Barnes)
4. "Pop Goes the Weasel" (reggae schottische/traditional, arranged by Brave Combo)
5. "Three Weeks" (Carl Finch)
6. "Cuando escuches este vas" (Juan Garrido)
7. "Don't Get Married" (Polish polka/traditional, arranged by Treltones, lyrics by Carl Finch)
8. "Peanut Polka" (traditional, arranged by Brave Combo)
9. "Do Something Different" (Carl Finch)
10. Polka Medley: Tinker's Polka/Lichtensteiner Polka/Beer Barrel Polka/Pennsylvania Polka/Monday Morning/Laughing Polka/La Adelita/Los Coronelas (trad., arr. Brave Combo/trad., arr. Brave Combo/Vejvoda/public domain, arr. Brave Combo/Lee-Manners/trad., arr. Toledo Polka Motion/trad., arr. Brave Combo/trad., arr. Brave Combo/trad., arr. Brave Combo)
11. "Come Back To Me" (Carl Finch)
12. "High Bounce Polka" (Polish polka/traditional, arranged by Brave Combo)

== Personnel ==
- Jeffrey Barnes: tenor saxophone, alto saxophone, clarinet, vocals
- Joseph Cripps: percussion
- Alan Emert: drums
- Carl Finch: guitar, accordion, keyboards, vocals
- Bubba Hernandez: bass, tuba, vocals
- Danny O'Brien: trumpet, flugelhorn

== Production ==
- Brave Combo arrangements: No Class Music, BMI
- Produced by Carl Finch and Brave Combo
- Recorded by David Castell at the Sons of Hermann Hall, Dallas, Texas, Friday, September 26, 1997; and by Coy Green at Rick's Place, Denton, Texas, Saturday, September 27, 1997
- Mixed by Eric Delagard at Reeltime Audio, Denton, Texas
- Coordinated for EasyDisc by Louisa Hufstader
- Mastered by Jonathan Wyner at M-Works, Cambridge, Massachusetts
- Design by mooremoscowitz
