= Dick Duerrstein =

American painter

Dick Duerrstein is an American painter of Disney Fine Art, who worked as the Creative Director for the Walt Disney Company's Consumer Products Division for more than 2 decades.

== Biography ==
Like most artists, Dick Duerrstein found his calling early in life. He remembers that his "mother's shopping list always included a note to buy [him] another ream of white paper to draw on."

After graduating from the Art Center College of Design in Pasadena, California, Duerrstein took a job at the Walt Disney Company, where he soon worked his way up the ladder and became the Creative Director for the company's Consumer Products Division. It was here that he was able to work and study alongside many Disney animators, including Ward Kimball (a member of Disney's Nine Old Men, creator of Dumbo, the Mad Hatter, the Cheshire Cat and Jiminy Cricket) and Chuck Jones (creator of Looney Tunes and Merrie Melodies).

After 22 years at Disney, Duerrstein left to pursue a career in Disney Fine Art. He comments on this decision in the July 2007 issue of Art Business News: "I got a wild hair to start doing characters in more artistic ways. It was difficult in the beginning because there wasn't any framework for doing this kind of work commercially." Nearly 10 years after making this decision, Duerrstein has succeeded in becoming one of the most collected painters of Disney Fine Art.

== Style ==
In his fine art pieces, Dick focuses on elements of design, inspired by his long history designing a variety of projects at Disney.

In homage to the original character construction, Dick first draws the figure onto canvas using a light blue line, exactly like an animator would do. After this, he begins to layer the thick hues of oil and acrylic paint on top, yet he still lets the original blue line peek through. This allows each piece to still remain true to the original creator's concept while allowing for Duerrstein's trademark energy and movement to come through.
