= So Called Friend =

1993 single by Texas

Single by Texas

from the album Ricks Road
- B-side: "You're the One I Want It For"; "Tonight I Stay with You"
- Released: 30 August 1993
- Length: 3:45
- Label: Vertigo
- Songwriters: Johnny McElhone; Sharleen Spiteri
- Producer: Paul Fox

Texas singles chronology
"Tired of Being Alone" (1992)	"So Called Friend" (1993)	"You Owe It All to Me" (1993)

Music video
- "So Called Friend" on YouTube

"So Called Friend" is a song by Scottish band Texas, released in August 1993, by Vertigo Records, as the lead single from their third studio album, Ricks Road (1993). It was written by band members Johnny McElhone and Sharleen Spiteri, and produced by Paul Fox. The song reached number 30 on the UK Singles Chart and number four in Portugal. It was also the theme song of American television sitcom Ellen.

== Music video ==
The accompanying music video for "So Called Friend" was directed by Smith & Jones for Dum Dum and produced by Tom Bird/Dum Dum. It was released on 18 October 1993 and conveys Glasgow's urban landscape with aerial views.

== Track listings ==
- 7-inch and cassette single
1. "So Called Friend" – 3:45
2. "You're the One I Want It For" – 4:57
- CD1
1. "So Called Friend" – 3:45
2. "You're the One I Want It For" – 4:57
3. "Tonight I Stay with You" – 4:12
4. "I've Been Missing You" – 3:15
- CD2
1. "So Called Friend" – 3:45
2. "You're the One I Want It For" – 4:57
3. "Mothers Heaven" (French remix) – 4:13
4. "Tired of Being Alone" – 2:59

== Charts ==
Chart (1993)	Peak position
Germany (GfK)	92
Europe (Eurochart Hot 100)	85
Europe (European Hit Radio)	27
Portugal (AFP)	4
UK Singles (OCC)	30
UK Airplay (Music Week)	29
