= Sara Hickman =

American singer (born 1963)

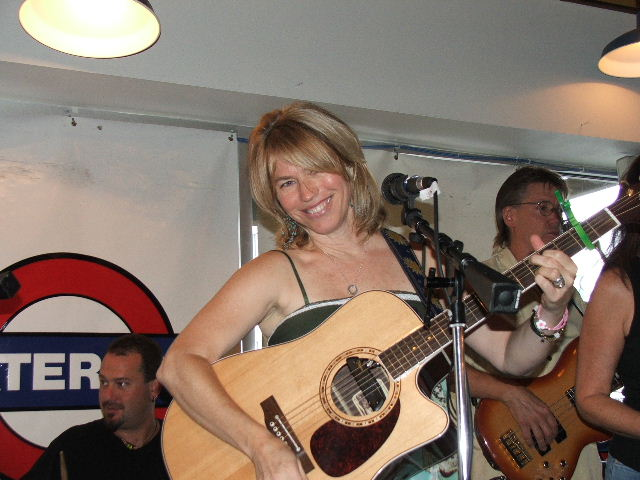
- Sara Hickman at Waterloo Records in Austin, Texas (2006)

Background information
- Born: March 1, 1963 (age 63); Jacksonville, North Carolina, U.S.
- Genre: rock/folk/pop/children's
- Occupation: Singer-songwriter
- Instruments: Vocals guitar

Sara Hickman (born March 1, 1963) is an American singer, songwriter, and artist.

== Biography ==
Hickman was born in Jacksonville, North Carolina. Both of her parents were artists, with her mother working as a fiber artist and her father as a painter. She grew up in Houston, Texas, where she attended the High School for the Performing and Visual Arts as a vocal major. In 1986, she graduated from North Texas State University (now University of North Texas) with a BA in painting. She moved to Dallas, Texas in 1987, where she became a recording artist and musical entertainer. In 1995, she moved to Austin, Texas, then to Smithville, Texas where she now lives with her husband, Lance Schriner and two children, Lili and Iolana.

Hickman is an avid supporter of numerous charities and organizations benefiting children, women, and health. She helps these organizations by creating awareness, donating her time and, often, contributing portions of the proceeds from her record sales. She has been awarded the Humana "Women Helping Women" award for her generous work with such organizations as Safe Place, Habitat for Humanity, House the Homeless, the Society for the Prevention of Cruelty to Animals, the Race for the Cure, and many other animal and human rights organizations. She was also made an honorary member of the National Association of Music Therapy because of her work in that area.

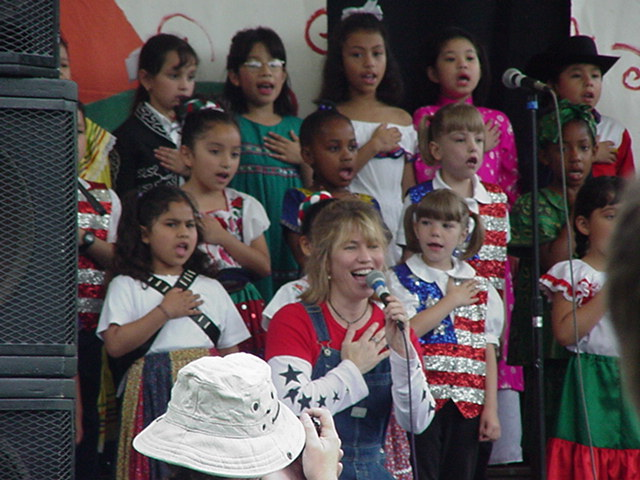
Sara Hickman performing in 2002 at Kennedy Center Imagination Celebration in Dallas

In the early 2000s, she was the National Ambassador for Half Price Books, helping to promote literacy throughout the United States by visiting hospitals and schools where she performed for and read to children. Other positions she has held include membership on the board of directors of NARAS (National Academy of Recording Arts and Sciences, i.e., the Grammies), an advisory board member for ARTS, and the Honorary Chair for Humana's Women Helping Women Awards Ceremony and Convention. She was also Honorary Chair of the Umlauf Sculpture Garden, and was invited to be Honorary Chair for the Austin Race for the Cure.

The Texas State Commission on the Arts appointed Hickman the Official Texas State Musician for 2010.

== Music ==
Hickman's first performance was during a poetry competition in the first grade. She continued to perform in talent shows during her school career and, at the age of 14, she landed her first paid gig. While in high school, she was also introduced to the use of music for social good. She played in a psychiatric unit, helping to provide music therapy to patients.

While she was attending college, Hickman began to play clubs and coffeehouses in and around Dallas. In 1988, Hickman released the LP Equal Scary People through the Four Dots Label. In March 1989, she was featured on the cover of the Dallas Observer as an up and coming musician. The Observer feature led to her signing on the Elektra Records label, through which she released Shortstop. In 1993, however, Elektra and Hickman parted. Hickman, desiring access to the songs which Elektra still had rights to, raised over $40,000 from her supporters to purchase the songs back from Elektra and release a new album, Necessary Angels.

Hickman has released more than 15 albums, including a half dozen on major record labels, and a few independent albums. She has performed on at least 25 albums by other musicians. She had a No. 3 adult contemporary hit "I Couldn't Help Myself", has been a guest on NBC's The Tonight Show twice, hosted her own VH-1 special, produced an independent video, Joy, that won first place in the USA Film Festival, and co-produced the PBS documentary Take It Like A Man.

Hickman also performed a Martika song for the soundtrack to the film, Arachnophobia. She has both appeared in and sung for national ad campaigns for Wal-Mart, Daisy Sour Cream, Southwest Airlines, Fannie Mae, Popeyes Louisiana Kitchen, and others. She was a part of the country girl group, Domestic Science Club with Robin Lynn Macy and Patty Lege from 1992 until 1998.

Hickman's songs were covered by other Texas musicians, including Willie Nelson, on the 2011 CD The Best of Times, which was a benefit for the organization then known as Theatre Action Project.

== Awards ==
- The National Association of Music Therapists
- Austin Under Forty (2002-Entertainment)
- The Kerrville Folk Festival (community service)
- The Speaking of Women's Health Initiative (community service)
- Austin Music Awards (1999-2000-one of the top three songwriters, one of the top five female vocalists, top five singer-songwriters, in top three folk artists, top ten musicians)
- The Dallas Observer Awards (Best Musician, Best Producer, Best Indie Release, Best Major Label Release, Best Female Vocalist)
- Parents' Choice (Gold-Toddler/2001, Recommended-Big Kid/2004)
- NAPPA Gold (Newborn-2001, Big Kid and Toddler-2004)
- Dr. Toy's Top 10 Audio Tapes of 2001 (Toddler)
- Dr. Toy's 100 Best Toys of 2001 (Toddler)
- Best Classic Recording 2003 Children's Web Media (Newborn & Toddler)
- 2003 New Beginning Center Award
- Dr. Toy's Best Vacation Product 2004 (Big Kid)
- Creative Child's Top Creative Toy Award 2005 (Toddler – Preferred Choice, Newborn – Seal of Excellence)
- Austin American-Statesman XL Fortunate 500 List: 2007 Edition
- Texas State Musician: 2010

== Discography ==
- Equal Scary People
- Shortstop
- Necessary Angels
- Domestic Science Club with Patty Mitchell Lege and Dixie Chicks founding member Robin Macy
- Domestic Science Club - "Three Women" with Patty Mitchell Lege and Robin Macy
- Misfits
- Two Kinds of Laughter
- One Flower to the Left
- Spiritual Appliances
- This Christmas Wish
- Ready to Pop
- Faithful Heart
- Newborn
- Toddler
- Big Kid
- Motherlode
- Absence of Blame
- Shine
- Newborn, Too
- Love Is a Journey with African Children's Choir
- Guest Artist: Soundtrack "Arachnophobia" track #1 "Blue Eyes Are Sensitive to the Light"

== Videography ==
- Joy (Video inspired by homeless woman. Winner of a USA Film Festival award)
- Take It Like a Man (PBS documentary) co-produced
- I Am Going On a Journey (DVD) (Released September 14, 2003)

== See also ==
- Music of Austin
