= Carl Finch =

American musician

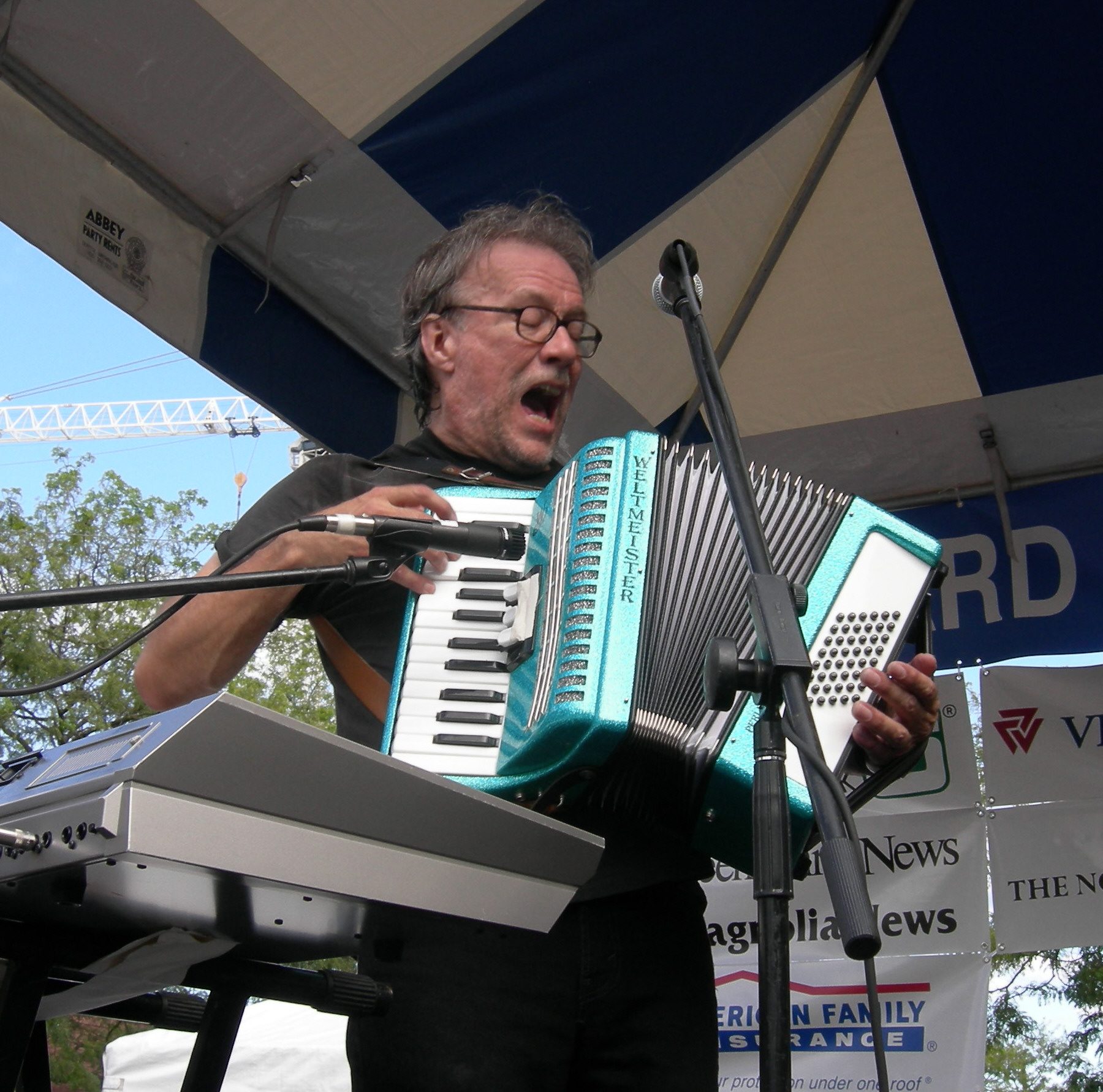
- Finch in 2007

Background information
- Born: November 29, 1951 (age 74)
- Origin: Texarkana, Texas, United States
- Genre: Rock/polka rock
- Occupations: vocalist, songwriter, record producer
- Instruments: Accordion, keyboard, guitar
- Years active: 1978 to present
- Labels: Four Dots, Rounder, DenTone, Cleveland International
- Website: https://bravecombo.com/

Carl Finch (born November 29, 1951, in Texarkana, Texas) is a guitarist, keyboard player, accordionist, vocalist, songwriter and record producer who co-founded the Grammy-winning polka rock/dance rock band Brave Combo in 1979 in Denton, Texas.

== Career highlights ==
He co-produced the albums Equal Scary People for the singer-songwriter Sara Hickman and El Gato Negro for the conjunto musician Santiago Jimenez, Jr. He composed music for and appears as an extra in David Byrne's 1986 movie True Stories. His instrumental "Mall Muzak" and "Buster's Theme" appears on the associated album Sounds from True Stories. He co-wrote the music for the play Evelyn and the Polka King. He produced the opening for YuYu Hakusho and both the opening and ending themes for the Funimation dub of Dragon Ball and Case Closed. He appeared in animated form, along with the rest of Brave Combo, on an episode of The Simpsons in 2004. He produced and, along with Brave Combo, performed all of the music for the 2008 animated PBS television series Click and Clack's As the Wrench Turns.

== Personal life ==
Finch is a vegetarian and does not drink alcohol. "I’m a vegetarian, and one of my goals is to take some of the emphasis in the polka thing away from the meat and the beer, and to focus more on the music," Finch said in a 2000 interview with MTV. "It’s a pretty big challenge, but I would love it if there were none of those stereotypical attachments that most people think about when they hear a polka. God, I would love that. It would be just perfect."
