= 39th Annual Grammy Awards =

1997 US music awards ceremony

- Date: February 26, 1997
- Location: Madison Square Garden, New York City
- Hosted by: Ellen DeGeneres
- Most awards: Babyface and the Beatles (3)
- Most nominations: Babyface (12)

Television/radio coverage
- Network: CBS

The 39th Annual Grammy Awards were held on February 26, 1997, at Madison Square Garden, New York City. They recognized accomplishments by musicians from the previous year. Babyface and the Beatles were the night's biggest winners, with 3 awards each. Celine Dion, Toni Braxton, Sheryl Crow, and the Fugees won two awards. Celine Dion for "Best Pop Album" and "Album of the Year" and Toni Braxton for "Best Female R&B Vocal Performance" and "Best Female Pop Vocal Performance". The show was hosted by Ellen DeGeneres who also performed the opening with Shawn Colvin, Bonnie Rait, and Chaka Khan.

== Performers ==
- Chaka Khan, Bonnie Raitt, Sheila E., Shawn Colvin & Ellen DeGeneres - Opening
- Smashing Pumpkins – 1979
- Natalie Cole with Wayne Shorter & Herbie Hancock – A Tribute to Ella Fitzgerald: (If You Can't Sing It) You'll Have to Swing It (Mr. Paganini)
- Bruce Springsteen – The Ghost of Tom Joad
- Celine Dion with David Foster – All By Myself
- Beck – Where It's At
- No Doubt – Spiderwebs
- Tracy Chapman – Give Me One Reason
- The Fugees – No Woman, No Cry
- Vince Gill with Alison Krauss and Union Station - High Lonesome Sound
- Patty Loveless - A Thousand Times a Day
- Vince Gill, Patty Loveless with Alison Krauss and Union Station - Working on a Building
- Brandy - Sittin' Up in My Room
- Mary J. Blige - Not Gon' Cry
- Whitney Houston - Exhale (Shoop Shoop)
- Whitney Houston with CeCe Winans, Brandy, Mary J. Blige, Chaka Khan & Aretha Franklin – Count On Me
- Eric Clapton & Babyface – Change The World
- Riverdance: Music from the Show
- Gil Shaham with Charles Dutoit - Prokofiev: Violin Concerto No. 1 In D Major, Op. 19 - 2. Scherzo. Vivacissimo

== Presenters ==
- Maxwell & Toni Braxton – Best Rap Album
- LeAnn Rimes & Clint Black – Best Country Album
- Kevin Bacon, Fiona Apple & Dwight Yoakam – Best Male Rock Vocal Performance
- Elvis Costello & Burt Bacharach – Best Female Rock Vocal Performance
- Kevin Spacey & Jewel – Best Hard Rock Performance
- Deana Carter, Shawn Colvin & Trisha Yearwood – Best Contemporary Folk Album
- Enrique Iglesias, Tyra Banks & LL Cool J – Best Female Pop Vocal Performance
- Seal & Bonnie Raitt – Best Male Pop Vocal Performance
- Quincy Jones & Liza Minnelli – Best Musical Show Album
- Jessye Norman - Best Instrumental Soloist(s) Performance (with Orchestra)
- Jakob Dylan, Sheryl Crow & Steve Winwood – Best New Artist
- Tony Rich Project & Gloria Estefan – Song of the Year
- Tony Bennett, Aretha Franklin & Stevie Wonder – Record of the Year
- Sting & Diana Ross – Album of the Year

== Award winners ==
=== General ===
Record of the Year

- "Change the World" – Eric Clapton
  - Kenneth "Babyface" Edmonds, producer
- "Give Me One Reason" – Tracy Chapman
  - Tracy Chapman & Don Gehman, producers
- "Because You Loved Me" – Celine Dion
  - David Foster, producer
- "Ironic" – Alanis Morissette
  - Glen Ballard, producer
- "1979" – The Smashing Pumpkins
  - Billy Corgan, Flood and Alan Moulder, producers

Album of the Year

- Falling Into You – Celine Dion
  - Roy Bittan, Jeff Bova, David Foster, Humberto Gatica, Jean-Jacques Goldman, Rick Hahn, Dan Hill, John Jones (music producer), Aldo Nova, Rick Nowels, Steven Rinkoff, Billy Steinberg, Jim Steinman and Ric Wake, producers
- Odelay – Beck
  - Beck Hansen and The Dust Brothers, producers
- The Score – Fugees
  - Diamond D, Jerry "Te Bass" Duplessis, John Forté, Lauryn Hill, Shawn King, Prakazrel "Pras", Salaam Remi, Handel Tucker and Wyclef, producers
- Mellon Collie and the Infinite Sadness – The Smashing Pumpkins
  - Billy Corgan, Flood and Alan Moulder, producers
- Waiting to Exhale Soundtrack – various artists
  - Babyface, producer

Song of the Year

- "Change the World"
  - Gordon Kennedy, Wayne Kirkpatrick & Tommy Sims, songwriters (Eric Clapton)
- "Because You Loved Me"
  - Diane Warren, songwriter (Celine Dion)
- "Blue"
  - Bill Mack, songwriter (LeAnn Rimes)
- "Exhale (Shoop Shoop)"
  - Kenneth "Babyface" Edmonds, songwriter (Whitney Houston)
- "Give Me One Reason"
  - Tracy Chapman, songwriter (Tracy Chapman)

Best New Artist

- LeAnn Rimes
- Garbage
- Jewel
- No Doubt
- The Tony Rich Project

=== Pop ===
Best Female Pop Vocal Performance

- "Un-Break My Heart" – Toni Braxton
- "Get Out of This House" – Shawn Colvin
- "Because You Loved Me" – Celine Dion
- "Reach" – Gloria Estefan
- "Who Will Save Your Soul" - Jewel

Best Male Pop Vocal Performance

- "Change the World" – Eric Clapton
- "Let's Make a Night to Remember" – Bryan Adams
- "Key West Intermezzo (I Saw You First)" – John Mellencamp
- "Nobody Knows" – The Tony Rich Project
- "Let Your Soul Be Your Pilot" – Sting

Best Pop Performance by a Duo or Group with Vocal

- "Free as a Bird" – The Beatles
- "As Long as It Matters" – Gin Blossoms
- "When You Love a Woman" – Journey
- "Fire on the Mountain" – The Neville Brothers
- "Peaches" – The Presidents of the United States of America
- "When You Wish Upon a Star" – Take 6

Best Pop Collaboration with Vocals

- "When I Fall in Love" – Natalie Cole with Nat King Cole
- "God Give Me Strength" – Burt Bacharach and Elvis Costello
- "Missing You" – Brandy, Tamia, Gladys Knight and Chaka Khan
- "Count on Me" – Whitney Houston and CeCe Winans
- "My Way" – Frank Sinatra and Luciano Pavarotti
- "The Wind Cries Mary" – Sting, John McLaughlin, Dominic Miller and Vinnie Colaiuta

Best Pop Instrumental Performance

- "The Sinister Minister" – Béla Fleck and the Flecktones
- "Theme from Mission: Impossible" – Adam Clayton and Larry Mullen Jr.
- "Mission: Impossible" – Lalo Schifrin with London Philharmonic Orchestra
- "Mellon Collie and the Infinite Sadness" – The Smashing Pumpkins
- "Kiss Lonely Goodbye (Harmonica with Orchestra)" – Stevie Wonder

Best Pop Album

- Falling into You – Celine Dion
- Secrets – Toni Braxton
  - Babyface, producer
- New Beginning – Tracy Chapman
  - Tracy Chapman and Don Gehman, producers
- A Few Small Repairs – Shawn Colvin
  - John Leventhal, producer
- Mercury Falling – Sting
  - Hugh Padgham and Sting, producers

=== Traditional Pop ===
Best Traditional Pop Vocal Performance

- Here's to the Ladies – Tony Bennett
- Dedicated to Nelson – Rosemary Clooney
- Stardust – Natalie Cole
- Gently – Liza Minnelli
- I'll Be Your Baby Tonight – Bernadette Peters

=== Rock ===
Best Female Rock Vocal Performance

- "If It Makes You Happy" – Sheryl Crow
- "Mother Mother" – Tracy Bonham
- "Give Me One Reason" – Tracy Chapman
- "Spider Web" – Joan Osborne
- "Burning Down the House" – Bonnie Raitt

Best Male Rock Vocal Performance

- "Where It's At" – Beck
- "The Only Thing That Looks Good on Me Is You" – Bryan Adams
- "Ain't Gone 'n' Give Up on Love" – Eric Clapton
- "Cry Love" – John Hiatt
- "Dead Man Walkin'" – Bruce Springsteen

Best Rock Performance by a Duo or Group with Vocal

- "So Much to Say" – Dave Matthews Band
- "Stupid Girl" – Garbage
- "Wonderwall" – Oasis
- "1979" – The Smashing Pumpkins
- "6th Avenue Heartache" – The Wallflowers

Best Hard Rock Performance

- "Bullet with Butterfly Wings" – The Smashing Pumpkins
- "Again" – Alice in Chains
- "Bulls on Parade" – Rage Against the Machine
- "Pretty Noose" – Soundgarden
- "Trippin' on a Hole in a Paper Heart" – Stone Temple Pilots

Best Metal Performance

- "Tire Me" – Rage Against the Machine
- "Shoots and Ladders" – Korn
- "Suicide Note Pt. I" – Pantera
- "I'm Your Boogie Man" – White Zombie
- "Hands of Death (Burn Baby Burn)" – Rob Zombie and Alice Cooper

Best Rock Instrumental Performance

- "SRV Shuffle" – Eric Clapton, Robert Cray, Buddy Guy, Dr. John, B.B. King, Art Neville, Bonnie Raitt and Jimmie Vaughan
- "Green Onions" – Booker T. & the M.G.'s
- "Pavilion" – Eric Johnson
- "(You're) My World" – Joe Satriani
- "Respect the Wind" – Edward and Alex Van Halen

Best Rock Song

- "Give Me One Reason"
  - Tracy Chapman, songwriter (Tracy Chapman)
- "Cry Love"
  - John Hiatt, songwriter (John Hiatt)
- "6th Avenue Heartache"
  - Jakob Dylan, songwriter (The Wallflowers)
- "Stupid Girl"
  - Garbage, songwriters (Garbage)
- "Too Much"
  - Dave Matthews Band, songwriters (Dave Matthews Band)
- "Wonderwall"
  - Noel Gallagher, songwriter (Oasis)

Best Rock Album

- Sheryl Crow – Sheryl Crow
  - Sheryl Crow, producer
- Crash – Dave Matthews Band
  - Steve Lillywhite, producer
- Tragic Kingdom – No Doubt
  - Matthew Wilder, producer
- Road Tested – Bonnie Raitt
  - Bonnie Raitt and Don Was, producers
- Broken Arrow – Neil Young with Crazy Horse
  - Neil Young, producer

=== Alternative ===
Best Alternative Music Performance

- Odelay – Beck
- Boys for Pele – Tori Amos
- The Burdens of Being Upright – Tracy Bonham
- New Adventures in Hi-Fi – R.E.M.
- Mellon Collie and the Infinite Sadness – The Smashing Pumpkins

=== R&B ===
Best Female R&B Vocal Performance

- "You're Makin' Me High" – Toni Braxton
- "Not Gon' Cry" – Mary J. Blige
- "Sittin' Up in My Room" – Brandy
- "Exhale (Shoop Shoop)" – Whitney Houston
- "You Put a Move on My Heart" – Tamia

Best Male R&B Vocal Performance

- "Your Secret Love" – Luther Vandross
- "Lady" – D'Angelo
- "A Change Is Gonna Come" – Al Green
- "New World Order" – Curtis Mayfield
- "Like a Woman" – The Tony Rich Project

Best R&B Performance by a Duo or Group with Vocal

- "Killing Me Softly" – Fugees
- "Slow Jams" – Babyface and Tamia with Portrait and Barry White
- "Stomp" – Luke Cresswell, Fiona Wilkes, Carl Smith, Fraser Morrison, Everett Bradley, Mr. X, Melle Mel, Coolio, Yo-Yo, Chaka Khan, Charlie Wilson, Shaquille O'Neal and Luniz
- "Don't Let Go (Love)" – En Vogue
- "Never Miss the Water" – Chaka Khan featuring Meshell Ndegeocello

Best R&B Song

- "Exhale (Shoop Shoop)"
  - Babyface, songwriter (Whitney Houston)
- "Sittin' Up in My Room"
  - Babyface, songwriter (Brandy)
- "You Put a Move on My Heart"
  - Rod Temperton, songwriter (Tamia)
- "Your Secret Love"
  - Luther Vandross and Reed Vertelney (Luther Vandross)
- "You're Makin' Me High"
  - Babyface, Toni Braxton and Bryce Wilson, songwriters (Toni Braxton)

Best R&B Album

- Words – The Tony Rich Project
  - Tony Rich, producer
- Moving On – Oleta Adams
  - Michael J. Powell, producer
- Maxwell's Urban Hang Suite – Maxwell
  - Musze, producer
- New World Order – Curtis Mayfield
- Peace Beyond Passion – Meshell Ndegeocello
  - David Gamson, producer

=== Blues ===
Best Traditional Blues Album

- James Cotton for Deep in the Blues

Best Contemporary Blues Album

- Keb' Mo' for Just Like You

=== Children's ===
Best Musical Album for Children

- George Massenburg (producer) & Linda Ronstadt (producer & artist) for Dedicated to the One I Love

Best Spoken Word Album for Children

- Virginia Callaway, Steven Heller (producers) & David Holt (producer & narrator) for Stellaluna

=== Comedy ===
- From 1994 through 2003, see "Best Spoken Comedy Album" under the "Spoken" field, below.

=== Classical ===
- Best Orchestral Performance
  - Michael Tilson Thomas (conductor) & the San Francisco Symphony for Prokofiev: Romeo and Juliet (Scenes From the Ballet)
- Best Classical Vocal Performance
  - James Levine (conductor), Bryn Terfel & the Metropolitan Opera Orchestra for Opera Arias - Works of Mozart, Wagner, Borodin
- Best Opera Recording
  - Brian Couzens (producer), Richard Hickox (conductor), Philip Langridge, Alan Opie, Janice Watson, the London Symphony Chorus & the City of London Sinfonia for Britten: Peter Grimes
- Best Choral Performance
  - Andrew Litton (conductor), Neville Creed, David Hill (chorus masters) & the Bournemouth Symphony Orchestra & Chorus for Walton: Belshazzar's Feast
- Best Instrumental Soloist(s) Performance (with orchestra)
  - Esa-Pekka Salonen (conductor), Yefim Bronfman & the Los Angeles Philharmonic for Bartók: The Three Piano Concertos
- Best Instrumental Soloist Performance (without orchestra)
  - Earl Wild for The Romantic Master - Works of Saint-Saëns, Handel
- Best Small Ensemble Performance (with or without conductor)
  - Pierre Boulez (conductor) & the Ensemble Inter-Contemporain for Boulez: ...Explosante-Fixe...
- Best Chamber Music Performance
  - The Cleveland Quartet for Corigliano: String Quartet
- Best Classical Contemporary Composition
  - John Corigliano (composer) & the Cleveland Quartet for Corigliano: String Quartet
- Best Classical Album
  - Joanna Nickrenz (producer), Leonard Slatkin (conductor), Michelle De Young, various artists, the Washington Choral Arts Society Male Chorus, the Washington Oratorio Society Male Chorus & the National Symphony Orchestra for Corigliano: Of Rage and Remembrance

=== Composing and arranging ===
- Best Instrumental Composition
  - Herbie Hancock & Jean Hancock (composers) for "Manhattan (Island of Lights and Love)" performed by Herbie Hancock
- Best Song Written Specifically for a Motion Picture or for Television
  - Diane Warren (songwriter) for "Because You Loved Me" (Theme from Up Close & Personal) performed by Céline Dion
- Best Instrumental Composition Written for a Motion Picture or for Television
  - David Arnold (composer) for Independence Day
- Best Instrumental Arrangement
  - Michael Kamen (arranger) for "An American Symphony (Mr. Holland's Opus)"
- Best Instrumental Arrangement with Accompanying Vocal(s)
  - Alan Broadbent & David Foster (arrangers) for "When I Fall in Love" performed by Natalie Cole with Nat King Cole

=== Country ===
- Best Female Country Vocal Performance
  - LeAnn Rimes for "Blue"
- Best Male Country Vocal Performance
  - Vince Gill for "Worlds Apart"
- Best Country Performance by a Duo or Group with Vocal
  - Brooks & Dunn for "My Maria"
- Best Country Collaboration with Vocals
  - Vince Gill & Alison Krauss & Union Station for "High Lonesome Sound"
- Best Country Instrumental Performance
  - Chet Atkins for "Jam Man"
- Best Country Song
  - Bill Mack (songwriter) for "Blue" performed by LeAnn Rimes
- Best Country Album
  - Billy Williams (producer) & Lyle Lovett (producer & artist) for The Road to Ensenada
- Best Bluegrass Album
  - Todd Phillips (producer) for True Life Blues: The Songs of Bill Monroe performed by various artists

=== Folk ===
- Best Traditional Folk Album
  - Pete Seeger for Pete
- Best Contemporary Folk Album
  - Bruce Springsteen for The Ghost of Tom Joad

=== Gospel ===
- Best Pop/Contemporary Gospel Album
  - Neal Joseph & Norman Miller (producers) for Tribute - The Songs of Andraé Crouch performed by various artists
- Best Rock Gospel Album
  - dc Talk for Jesus Freak
- Best Traditional Soul Gospel Album
  - Cissy Houston for Face to Face
- Best Contemporary Soul Gospel Album
  - Kirk Franklin for Whatcha Lookin' 4
- Best Southern Gospel, Country Gospel or Bluegrass Gospel Album
  - Andy Griffith for I Love to Tell the Story - 25 Timeless Hymns
- Best Gospel Album by a Choir or Chorus
  - Shirley Caesar (choir director) for Just a Word performed by Shirley Caesar's Outreach Convention Choir

=== Historical ===
- Best Historical Album
  - Bob Belden (producer), Phil Schaap (producer & engineer), Mark Wilder (engineer) for Miles Davis & Gil Evans: The Complete Columbia Studio Recordings performed by Miles Davis & Gil Evans

=== Jazz ===
- Best Jazz Instrumental Solo
  - Michael Brecker for "Cabin Fever"
- Best Jazz Instrumental Performance, Individual or Group
  - Michael Brecker for Tales From the Hudson
- Best Large Jazz Ensemble Performance
  - Grover Mitchell for Live at Manchester Craftsmen's Guild
- Best Jazz Vocal Performance
  - Cassandra Wilson for New Moon Daughter
- Best Contemporary Jazz Performance
  - Wayne Shorter for High Life
- Best Latin Jazz Performance
  - Paquito D'Rivera for Portraits of Cuba

=== Latin ===
- Best Latin Pop Performance
  - Enrique Iglesias for Enrique Iglesias
- Best Tropical Latin Performance
  - Rubén Blades for La Rosa de los Vientos
- Best Mexican-American/Tejano Music Performance
  - La Mafia for Un Millón de Rosas

=== Musical Show ===
- Best Musical Show Album
  - Bill Whelan (composer, lyricist & producer) & various artists for Riverdance

=== Music video ===
- Best Music Video, Short Form
  - Vincent Joliet (video producer), Joe Pytka (video director) and the Beatles for "Free as a Bird"
- Best Music Video, Long Form
  - Chips Chipperfield, Neil Aspinall (video producers), Bob Smeaton, Geoff Wonfor (video directors) and the Beatles for The Beatles Anthology

=== New Age ===
- Best New Age Album
  - Enya for The Memory of Trees

=== Packaging and Notes ===
- Best Recording Package
  - Andy Engel & Tommy Steele (art directors) for Ultra-Lounge (Leopard Skin Sampler) performed by various artists
- Best Recording Package – Boxed
  - Arnold Levine & Chika Azuma (art directors) for The Complete Columbia Studio Recordings performed by Miles Davis & Gil Evans
- Best Album Notes
  - Bill Kirchner, Bob Belden, George Avakian & Phil Schaap (notes writers) for Miles Davis & Gil Evans: The Complete Columbia Studio Recordings performed by Miles Davis & Gil Evans

=== Polka ===
- Best Polka Album
  - Jimmy Sturr for Polka! All Night Long

=== Production and engineering ===
- Best Engineered Album, Non-Classical
  - Al Schmitt, Bruce Swedien, Francis Buckley & Tommy Vicari for Q's Jook Joint performed by Quincy Jones
- Best Engineered Album, Classical
  - Lawrence Rock, William Hoekstra (engineers), Leonard Slatkin (conductor) & the Saint Louis Symphony for Copland: Dance Symphony; Short Symphony; Organ Symphony
- Producer of the Year
  - Babyface
- Classical Producer of the Year
  - Joanna Nickrenz

=== Rap ===
Best Rap Solo Performance

- "Hey Lover" – LL Cool J
- "1, 2, 3, 4 (Sumpin' New)" – Coolio
- "If I Ruled the World (Imagine That)" – Nas
- "Rock With You" – Heavy D
- "Woo Hah!! Got You All in Check" – Busta Rhymes

Best Rap Performance by a Duo or Group

- "Tha Crossroads" – Bone Thugs-N-Harmony
- "California Love" – 2Pac featuring Dr. Dre and Roger Troutman
- "How Do U Want It" – 2Pac featuring K-Ci & JoJo
- "1nce Again" – A Tribe Called Quest
- "Champagne" – Salt-N-Pepa

Best Rap Album

- The Score – Fugees
- All Eyez On Me – 2Pac
- Beats, Rhymes and Life – A Tribe Called Quest
- Gangsta's Paradise – Coolio
- Mr. Smith – LL Cool J

=== Reggae ===
- Best Reggae Album
  - Bunny Wailer for Hall of Fame: A Tribute to Bob Marley's 50th Anniversary

=== Spoken ===
- Best Spoken Word or Non-musical Album
  - Hillary Rodham Clinton for It Takes a Village
- Best Spoken Comedy Album
  - Al Franken for Rush Limbaugh Is a Big Fat Idiot

=== World ===
- Best World Music Album
  - The Chieftains for Santiago

== Special Merit Awards ==
=== MusiCares Person of the Year ===
- Phil Collins
