= Shake, Rattle and Polka! =

Studio album by Jimmy Sturr and His Orchestra
- Released: October 11, 2005
- Genre: Polka
- Label: Rounder

Professional ratings
Review scores
Source	Rating
Allmusic	3/5 stars

Shake, Rattle and Polka! is an album by Jimmy Sturr and His Orchestra, released through Rounder Records on October 11, 2005. In 2006, the album won Sturr the Grammy Award for Best Polka Album.

== Track listing ==
1. "Kansas City" (Jerry Leiber and Mike Stoller) – 2:32
2. "Sea Cruise" (Huey "Piano" Smith) – 3:10
3. "Detour" (Paul Westmoreland) – 1:50
4. "Unchained Melody" (Alex North, Hy Zaret) – 2:53
5. "Tossin' and Turnin'" (Ritchie Adams, Malou Rene) – 2:51
6. "Maybellene" (Chuck Berry) – 2:24
7. "I Walk the Line" (Johnny Cash) – 2:41
8. "You Belong to Me" (Pee Wee King) – 3:04
9. "Blueberry Hill" (Vincent Rose, Larry Stock) – 2:27
10. "Love Me Tender" (Vera Matson, Elvis Presley) – 3:33
11. "Rock Around the Clock" (DeKnight, Friedman) – 1:43
12. "Promised Land" (Berry) – 2:40

== Personnel ==
- Ritchie Adams – Composer
- Ray Barno Orchestra – Clarinet, Sax (Baritone)
- Chuck Berry – Composer
- Mark Capps – Engineer
- Johnny Cash – Composer
- Dennis Coyman – Drums
- Ray DeBrown – Arranger
- Jimmy DeKnight – Composer
- Nick Devito – Clarinet, Sax (Alto)
- Joe Donofrio – Producer, Mixing, Audio Production
- The Duprees – Vocals
- Chris Eddy – Vocals, Guest Appearance
- Duane Eddy – Vocals, Performer, Guest Appearance
- Frankie Ford – Vocals, Guest Appearance
- Max Friedman – Composer
- Gennarose – Vocals
- David Greenberger – Liner Notes
- Allen Henson – Vocals (background)
- Ken Irwin – Producer, Mixing, Audio Production
- Johnny Karas – Sax (Tenor), Vocals
- Pee Wee King – Composer
- Dave Kowalski – Assistant Engineer
- Jerry Leiber – Composer
- Joe Magnuszewski – Clarinet, Sax (Alto)
- Vera Matson – Composer
- Delbert McClinton – Vocals, Guest Appearance
- Dr. Toby Mountain – Mastering
- Willie Nelson – Vocals, Guest Appearance
- Alex North – Composer
- Louis Dean Nunley – Vocals (background)
- The Orchestra – Performer
- Eric Parks – Trumpet
- Rich Pavasaris – Bass
- Al Piatkowski – Accordion
- Tom Pick – Producer, Engineer, Mixing, Audio Production
- Elvis Presley – Composer
- Malou Rene – Composer
- Vincent Rose – Composer
- Brad SanMartin – Song Notes
- Keith Slattery – Piano
- Huey "Piano" Smith – Composer
- Larry Stock – Composer
- Mike Stoller – Composer
- Jimmy Sturr – Mixing
- Frank Urbanovitch – Fiddle, Vocals
- Paul Westmoreland – Composer
- Henry Will – Arranger
- Curtis Young – Vocals (background)
- Hy Zaret – Composer

== See also ==
- Polka in the United States
