= 41st Annual Grammy Awards =

1999 US music awards ceremony

- Date: February 24, 1999
- Location: Shrine Auditorium, Los Angeles
- Hosted by: Rosie O'Donnell

Highlights
- Most awards: Lauryn Hill (5)
- Most nominations: Lauryn Hill (10)

Television/radio coverage
- Network: CBS

The 41st Annual Grammy Awards were held on February 24, 1999, at Shrine Auditorium in Los Angeles, recognizing musical achievements from the year 1998. Lauryn Hill led the ceremony with a record-breaking 10 nominations, becoming the first woman to achieve this milestone in a single night. During the event, she made history as the first woman to win five Grammy Awards in one night, the first artist to sweep the R&B field, and the first female rapper to win Best New Artist. Her critically acclaimed album The Miseducation of Lauryn Hill became the first hip-hop album to win Album of the Year. Hill's then unprecedented sweep of the Grammys is widely regarded as one of the most significant moments in hip hop history.

The ceremony was widely dubbed as the "Grammy Year of Women", because all of the nominees for Album of the Year were female artists including Madonna, Shania Twain, Sheryl Crow and Garbage (with Shirley Manson as the lead singer). Songwriters James Horner and Will Jennings won Song of the Year for Celine Dion's "My Heart Will Go On", while Dion herself took home Record of the Year for the same song.

Madonna who opened the show with a performance of "Nothing Really Matters", won three awards, while the Dixie Chicks, Vince Gill, Alanis Morissette, Stevie Wonder and Shania Twain each took home two awards. Ricky Martin's performance of "La Copa De La Vida" ("The Cup of Life") was considered a highlight of the night, symbolizing the rapid rise of Latin pop on the global stage.

== Performers ==
- Celine Dion & Andrea Bocelli - The Prayer
- Madonna - Nothing Really Matters
- Shania Twain - Man! I Feel Like A Woman
- Eric Clapton & B. B. King - Rock Me Baby
- Sheryl Crow - There Goes The Neighborhood
- Aerosmith - I Don't Want to Miss a Thing
- Vince Gill - If You Ever Have Forever in Mind
- Alanis Morissette - Uninvited
- Luciano Pavarotti - Nessun Dorma
- Kirk Franklin with Bono, Mary J. Blige, Gerald Levert & Crystal Lewis - Lean On Me
- Ricky Martin - La Copa de la Vida
- Lauryn Hill & Carlos Santana - To Zion
- Natalie Cole - Duke Ellington tribute
- James Horner - Titanic film score
- John Williams - Star Wars (Main Title)

== Presenters ==
- Jennifer Lopez & Jerry Seinfeld - Best Pop Vocal Album
- Foxy Brown, Chris Tucker & Missy Elliott - Best Rap Solo Performance
- Eric Clapton & B.B. King - Best New Artist
- Backstreet Boys & Martina McBride - Best Country Album
- Brandy & Monica - Best Spoken Comedy Album
- Shirley Manson & Billy Corgan - Best Female Rock Vocal Performance
- Dixie Chicks & Brian Setzer - Best Male Country Vocal Performance
- Faith Hill & Clint Black - Best Rock Album
- Jimmy Smits & Gloria Estefan - Best Latin Pop Performance
- Will Smith & Jada Pinkett-Smith - Song of the Year and introduced the Trustees Award honorees
- Puff Daddy, Beck & Sarah McLachlan - Record of the Year
- Sting & Whitney Houston - Album of the Year
- George Lucas - Introduces a tribute to music in film by introducing James Horner, John Williams,

== Award winners ==
=== General ===
Record of the Year

- "My Heart Will Go On" – Celine Dion
  - Walter Afanasieff, Simon Franglen & James Horner, producers; Simon Franglen, Humberto Gatica & David Gleeson, engineers/mixers
- "The Boy Is Mine" – Brandy & Monica
  - Dallas Austin, Brandy & Rodney Jerkins, producers; Leslie Brathwaite, Ben Garrison, Rodney Jerkins & Dexter Simmons, engineers/mixers
- "Iris" – Goo Goo Dolls
  - Rob Cavallo & Goo Goo Dolls, producers; Jack Joseph Puig & Allen Sides, engineers/mixers
- "Ray of Light" – Madonna
  - Madonna & William Orbit, producers; Pat McCarthy, engineer/mixer
- "You're Still the One" – Shania Twain
  - Robert John "Mutt" Lange, producer; Jeff Balding & Mike Shipley, engineers/mixers

Album of the Year

- The Miseducation of Lauryn Hill – Lauryn Hill
  - Lauryn Hill, producer; Commissioner Gordon, Matt Howe, Storm Jefferson, Ken Johnston, Tony Prendatt, Warren Riker, Chris Theis & Johnny Wyndrx, engineers/mixers
- The Globe Sessions – Sheryl Crow
  - Sheryl Crow, producer; Tchad Blake, Trina Shoemaker & Andy Wallace, engineers/mixers
- Version 2.0 – Garbage
  - Garbage, producers; Billy Bush, engineer/mixer
- Ray of Light – Madonna
  - Marius de Vries, Patrick Leonard, Madonna & William Orbit, producers; Jon Englesby, Pat McCarthy & David Reitzas, engineers/mixers
- Come On Over – Shania Twain
  - Robert John "Mutt" Lange, producer; Jeff Balding & Mike Shipley, engineers/mixers

Song of the Year

- "My Heart Will Go On"
  - James Horner and Will Jennings, songwriters (Celine Dion)
- "I Don't Want to Miss a Thing"
  - Diane Warren, songwriter (Aerosmith)
- "Iris"
  - John Rzeznik, songwriter (Goo Goo Dolls)
- "Lean On Me"
  - Kirk Franklin, songwriter (Kirk Franklin with Mary J. Blige, R. Kelly, Bono, Crystal Lewis & The Family)
- "You're Still the One"
  - Robert John "Mutt" Lange & Shania Twain, songwriters (Shania Twain)

Best New Artist

- Lauryn Hill
- Backstreet Boys
- Andrea Bocelli
- Dixie Chicks
- Natalie Imbruglia

=== Alternative ===
Best Alternative Music Performance

- Hello Nasty – Beastie Boys
- From the Choirgirl Hotel – Tori Amos
- Is This Desire? – PJ Harvey
- Airbag / How Am I Driving? – Radiohead
- Adore – The Smashing Pumpkins

=== Blues ===
- Best Traditional Blues Album
  - Otis Rush for Any Place I'm Going
- Best Contemporary Blues Album
  - Keb' Mo' for Slow Down

=== Children's ===
- Best Musical Album for Children
  - John Boylan (producer) for Elmopalooza! performed by the Sesame Street cast with various artists
- Best Spoken Word Album for Children
  - Dan Musselman and Stefan Rudnicki (producers) for The Children's Shakespeare performed by various artists

=== Comedy ===
- From 1994 through 2003, see "Best Spoken Comedy Album" under the "Spoken" field, below.

=== Classical ===
- Best Orchestral Performance
  - Pierre Boulez (conductor) & the Chicago Symphony Orchestra for Mahler: Symphony No. 9
- Best Classical Vocal Performance
  - Jeffrey Tate (conductor), Renée Fleming & the English Chamber Orchestra for The Beautiful Voice (Works of Charpentier, Gounod etc.)
- Best Opera Recording
  - Pierre Boulez (conductor), Jessye Norman, László Polgár & the Chicago Symphony Orchestra for Bartók: Bluebeard's Castle
- Best Choral Performance
  - Robert Shaw (conductor) & the Atlanta Symphony Orchestra & Chorus for Barber: Prayers of Kierkegaard/Vaughan Williams: Dona Nobis Pacem/Bartók: Cantata Profana
- Best Instrumental Soloist(s) Performance (with orchestra)
  - Krzysztof Penderecki (conductor), Anne-Sophie Mutter & the London Symphony Orchestra for Penderecki: Violin Concerto No. 2, Metamorphosen
- Best Instrumental Soloist Performance (without orchestra)
  - Murray Perahia for Bach: English Suites Nos. 1, 3 And 6
- Best Small Ensemble Performance (with or without conductor)
  - Steve Reich (conductor) for Reich: Music for 18 Musicians performed by Steve Reich and Musicians
- Best Chamber Music Performance
  - André Previn & Gil Shaham for American Scenes (Works of Copland, Previn, Barber, Gershwin)
- Best Classical Contemporary Composition
  - Krzysztof Penderecki (composer & conductor), Anne-Sophie Mutter & the London Symphony Orchestra for Penderecki: Violin Concerto No. 2, Metamorphosen
- Best Classical Album
  - James Mallinson (producer), Robert Shaw (conductor) & the Atlanta Symphony Orchestra & Chorus for Barber: Prayers of Kierkegaard/Vaughan Williams: Dona Nobis Pacem/Bartók: Cantata Profana
- Best Classical Crossover Album
  - Jorge Calandrelli (conductor) & Yo-Yo Ma for Soul of the Tango - The Music of Ástor Piazzolla

=== Composing and arranging ===
- Best Instrumental Composition
  - Future Man & Victor Lemonte Wooten (composers) for "Almost 12" performed by Bela Fleck & the Flecktones
- Best Song Written for a Motion Picture or for Television
  - James Horner & Will Jennings (songwriters) for "My Heart Will Go On" (from Titanic) performed by Céline Dion
- Best Instrumental Composition Written for a Motion Picture or for Television
  - John Williams (composer) for Saving Private Ryan
- Best Instrumental Arrangement
  - Don Sebesky (arranger) for "Waltz for Debby"
- Best Instrumental Arrangement Accompanying Vocal(s)
  - Herbie Hancock, Robert Sadin & Stevie Wonder (arrangers) for "St. Louis Blues" performed by Herbie Hancock

=== Country ===
- Best Female Country Vocal Performance
  - Shania Twain for "You're Still the One"
- Best Male Country Vocal Performance
  - Vince Gill for "If You Ever Have Forever in Mind"
- Best Country Performance by a Duo or Group with Vocal
  - Dixie Chicks for "There's Your Trouble"
- Best Country Collaboration with Vocals
  - Clint Black, Joe Diffie, Merle Haggard, Emmylou Harris, Alison Krauss, Patty Loveless, Earl Scruggs, Ricky Skaggs, Marty Stuart, Pam Tillis, Randy Travis, Travis Tritt & Dwight Yoakam for "Same Old Train"
- Best Country Instrumental Performance
  - Vince Gill & Randy Scruggs for "A Soldier's Joy"
- Best Country Song
  - Robert John "Mutt" Lange & Shania Twain (songwriters) for "You're Still the One" performed by Shania Twain
- Best Country Album
  - Blake Chancey, Paul Worley (producers), John Guess (engineer/mixer) & Dixie Chicks for Wide Open Spaces
- Best Bluegrass Album
  - Ricky Skaggs & Kentucky Thunder for Bluegrass Rules!

=== Folk ===
- Best Traditional Folk Album
  - The Chieftains for Long Journey Home
- Best Contemporary Folk Album
  - Lucinda Williams for Car Wheels on a Gravel Road

=== Gospel ===
- Best Pop/Contemporary Gospel Album
  - Deniece Williams for This Is My Song
- Best Rock Gospel Album
  - Ashley Cleveland for You Are There
- Best Traditional Soul Gospel Album
  - Cissy Houston for He Leadeth Me
- Best Contemporary Soul Gospel Album
  - Kirk Franklin for The Nu Nation Project
- Best Southern, Country or Bluegrass Gospel Album
  - Peter Afterman, John Huie & Ken Levitan (producers) for The Apostle - Music From and Inspired by the Motion Picture performed by various artists
- Best Gospel Choir or Chorus Album
  - O'landa Draper (choir director) for Reflections performed by O'Landa Draper & The Associates Choir

=== Historical ===
- Best Historical Album
  - Colin Escott, Kira Florita, Kyle Young (producers), Joseph M. Palmaccio & Tom Ruff (engineers) for The Complete Hank Williams

=== Jazz ===
- Best Jazz Instrumental Solo
  - Gary Burton & Chick Corea for "Rhumbata"
- Best Jazz Instrumental Performance, Individual or Group
  - Herbie Hancock for Gershwin's World
- Best Large Jazz Ensemble Performance
  - Grover Mitchell (director) for Count Plays Duke performed by the Count Basie Orchestra
- Best Jazz Vocal Performance
  - Shirley Horn for I Remember Miles
- Best Contemporary Jazz Performance
  - Pat Metheny Group for Imaginary Day
- Best Latin Jazz Performance
  - Arturo Sandoval for Hot House

=== Latin ===
- Best Latin Pop Performance
  - Ricky Martin for Vuelve
- Best Tropical Latin Performance
  - Marc Anthony for Contra La Corriente
- Best Mexican-American Music Performance
  - Los Super Seven for Los Super Seven
- Best Latin Rock/Alternative Performance
  - Maná for Sueños Líquidos
- Best Tejano Music Performance
  - Flaco Jiménez for Said and Done

=== Musical show ===
- Best Musical Show Album
  - Mark Mancina (producer) & the original Broadway cast for The Lion King

=== Music video ===
- Best Short Form Music Video
  - Jonas Åkerlund (video director) & Madonna for "Ray of Light"
- Best Long Form Music Video
  - Susan Lacy, Tamar Hacker (video producers), Timothy Greenfield-Sanders (video producer & director) & Lou Reed for American Masters - Lou Reed: Rock and Roll Heart

=== New Age ===
- Best New Age Album
  - Clannad for Landmarks

=== Packaging and notes ===
- Best Recording Package
  - Kevin Reagan (art director) for Ray of Light performed by Madonna
- Best Boxed Recording Package
  - Jim Kemp & Virginia Team (art director) for The Complete Hank Williams performed by Hank Williams
- Best Album Notes
  - Bob Belden, Michael Cuscuna & Todd Coolman (notes writers) for Miles Davis Quintet 1965–1968 performed by the Miles Davis Quintet

=== Polka ===
- Best Polka Album
  - Jimmy Sturr for Dance With Me performed by Jimmy Sturr & His Orchestra

=== Pop ===
- Best Female Pop Vocal Performance
  - Celine Dion for "My Heart Will Go On"
- Best Male Pop Vocal Performance
  - Eric Clapton for "My Father's Eyes"
- Best Pop Performance by a Duo or Group with Vocal
  - The Brian Setzer Orchestra for "Jump Jive an' Wail"
- Best Pop Collaboration with Vocals
  - Burt Bacharach & Elvis Costello for "I Still Have That Other Girl"
- Best Pop Instrumental Performance
  - The Brian Setzer Orchestra for "Sleepwalk"
- Best Dance Recording
  - Pat McCarthy (mixer), William Orbit (producer) & Madonna (producer & artist) for "Ray of Light"
- Best Pop Album
  - David Reitzas, Jon Ingoldsby & Pat McCarthy (engineers/mixers), William Orbit (producer) & Madonna (producer & artist) for Ray of Light

=== Production and engineering ===
- Best Engineered Album, Non-Classical
  - Andy Wallace, Tchad Blake & Trina Shoemaker (engineers) for The Globe Sessions performed by Sheryl Crow
- Best Engineered Album, Classical
  - Jack Renner (engineer), Robert Shaw (conductor) & the Atlanta Symphony Orchestra & Chorus for Barber:Prayers of Kierkegaard/Vaughan Williams: Dona Nobis Pacem/Bartók: Cantata Profana
- Producer of the Year, Non-Classical
  - Rob Cavallo
- Producer of the Year, Classical
  - Steven Epstein
- Remixer of the Year, Non-Classical
  - David Morales

=== R&B ===
Best Female R&B Vocal Performance

- "Doo Wop (That Thing)" – Lauryn Hill
- "Are You That Somebody?" – Aaliyah
- "Tyrone" – Erykah Badu
- "A Rose Is Still a Rose" – Aretha Franklin
- "I Get Lonely" – Janet Jackson

Best Male R&B Vocal Performance

- "St. Louis Blues" – Stevie Wonder in Herbie Hancock's Gershwin's World
- "Matrimony: Maybe You" – Maxwell
- "The Only One for Me" – Brian McKnight
- "My Way" – Usher
- "I Know" – Luther Vandross

Best R&B Performance by a Duo or Group with Vocal

- "The Boy Is Mine" – Brandy & Monica
- "Lean on Me" – Kirk Franklin with Mary J. Blige, R. Kelly, Bono, Crystal Lewis & The Family
- "Nothing Even Matters" – Lauryn Hill & D'Angelo
- "All My Life" – K-Ci & JoJo
- "Stay" – The Temptations

Best R&B Song

- "Doo Wop (That Thing)"
  - Lauryn Hill, songwriter (Lauryn Hill)
- "All My Life"
  - Rory Bennett & JoJo Hailey, songwriters (K-Ci & JoJo)
- "The Boy Is Mine"
  - Brandy, LaShawn Daniels, Fred Jerkins III, Rodney Jerkins & Japhe Tejeda, songwriters (Brandy & Monica)
- "Lean on Me"
  - Kirk Franklin, songwriter (Kirk Franklin with Mary J. Blige, R. Kelly, Bono, Crystal Lewis & The Family)
- "A Rose Is Still a Rose"
  - Lauryn Hill, songwriter (Aretha Franklin)

Best R&B Album

- The Miseducation of Lauryn Hill – Lauryn Hill; Lauryn Hill, producer; Commissioner Gordon & Tony Prendatt, engineers/mixers
- Live – Erykah Badu; Erykah Badu & Norman "Keys" Hurt, producers; Norman "Keys" Hurt, Gordon Mack & Kenny Ortiz, engineers/mixers
- Never Say Never – Brandy; Rodney Jerkins, producer; Brad Gilderman & Rodney Jerkins, engineers/mixers
- A Rose Is Still a Rose – Aretha Franklin
- Embrya – Maxwell; Musze, producer; Musze & Mike Pela, engineers/mixers

Best Traditional R&B Vocal Album

- Live! One Night Only – Patti LaBelle
- Believe in Me – Regina Belle
- To Make Me Who I Am – Aaron Neville
- Phoenix Rising – The Temptations
- I Know – Luther Vandross

=== Rap ===
Best Rap Solo Performance

- "Gettin' Jiggy wit It" – Will Smith
- "Dangerous" – Busta Rhymes
- "Lost Ones" – Lauryn Hill
- "Hard Knock Life" – Jay-Z
- "Gone till November" – Wyclef Jean

Best Rap Performance by a Duo or Group

- "Intergalactic" – Beastie Boys
- "Money Ain't A Thang" – Jermaine Dupri featuring Jay-Z
- "Deja Vu (Uptown Baby)" – Lord Tariq & Peter Gunz
- "Rosa Parks" – OutKast
- "Ghetto Supastar" – Pras Michel featuring Ol' Dirty Bastard and Mýa

Best Rap Album

- Vol. 2... Hard Knock Life – Jay-Z
- Capital Punishment – Big Punisher
- Life In 1472 - The Original Soundtrack – Jermaine Dupri
- Harlem World – Mase
- The Love Movement – A Tribe Called Quest

=== Reggae ===
- Best Reggae Album
  - Sly and Robbie for Friends

=== Rock ===
- Best Female Rock Vocal Performance
  - Alanis Morissette for "Uninvited"
- Best Male Rock Vocal Performance
  - Lenny Kravitz for "Fly Away"
- Best Rock Performance by a Duo or Group with Vocal
  - Aerosmith for "Pink"
- Best Rock Instrumental Performance
  - Pat Metheny Group for "The Roots of Coincidence"
- Best Hard Rock Performance
  - Jimmy Page & Robert Plant for "Most High"
- Best Metal Performance
  - Metallica for "Better Than You"
- Best Rock Song
  - Alanis Morissette (songwriter) for "Uninvited"
- Best Rock Album
  - Tchad Blake, Trina Shoemaker (engineers/mixers) & Sheryl Crow (producer & artist) for The Globe Sessions

=== Spoken ===
- Best Spoken Word Album
  - Christopher Reeve for Still Me
- Best Spoken Comedy Album
  - Mel Brooks & Carl Reiner for The 2000 Year Old Man in the Year 2000

=== Traditional pop ===
- Best Traditional Pop Vocal Performance
  - Patti Page for Live at Carnegie Hall: The 50th Anniversary Concert

=== World ===
- Best World Music Album
  - Gilberto Gil for Quanta Live

== Special merit awards ==
=== MusiCares Person of the Year ===
- Stevie Wonder

=== Grammy Legend Award ===
- Elton John
