= 38th Annual Grammy Awards =

1996 US music awards ceremony

- Date: February 28, 1996
- Location: Shrine Auditorium, Los Angeles
- Hosted by: Ellen DeGeneres
- Most awards: Alanis Morissette (4)
- Most nominations: Alanis Morissette and Mariah Carey (6)

Television/radio coverage
- Network: CBS

The 38th Annual Grammy Awards were held on February 28, 1996, at Shrine Auditorium, Los Angeles. The awards recognized accomplishments by musicians from the previous year. Alanis Morissette was the main recipient, being awarded four trophies, including Album of the Year. Mariah Carey and Boyz II Men opened the show with their Record of the Year nominated "One Sweet Day".

The ceremony was controversial for its unexpected snub of Mariah Carey's Daydream album, which proved to be one of the bestselling and most acclaimed albums of 1995. When the Grammy Award nominees were announced, and Daydream was nominated for six different awards, critics began raving how it would be "cleaning up" that year. Carey, being a multiple award nominee, was one of the headlining performers. Together with Boyz II Men, she sang a live rendition of "One Sweet Day", to a very positive response. The album had lost all of its six nominations, shocking most critics who branded it the "album of the year". Carey did not perform again until the 2006 ceremony, when she was nominated for eight awards (winning three) for The Emancipation of Mimi.

The ceremony is also significant for Tupac Shakur introducing Peter Criss, Ace Frehley, Gene Simmons, and Paul Stanley of Kiss for the first time in full makeup and costume since 1979. Shakur said "And I've seen just about everything now," in response to seeing Kiss walk on stage to announce the nominees for Best Pop Performance by a Duo or Group With Vocal.

== Performers ==
Artist(s)	Song(s)
Mariah Carey; Boyz II Men	"One Sweet Day"
Annie Lennox	"Train in Vain"
Coolio	"Gangsta's Paradise"
Alanis Morissette	"You Oughta Know"
Seal	"Kiss from a Rose"
TLC	"Waterfalls"
Joan Osborne	"One of Us"
Shania Twain	"Any Man of Mine"
The Mavericks	"All You Ever Do is Bring Me Down"
Hootie & the Blowfish	"I'm Going Home"
Dwight Yoakam	"Fast As You"
Maxim Vengerov	"Shostakovich: Violin Concerto No. 1"
Seal; Annie Lennox	Tribute to Marvin Gaye "What's Going On"
CeCe Winans; Whitney Houston; Shirley Caesar	Medley: "I Surrender All"; "Count on Me"; "Heaven"

== Presenters ==
Presenter(s)	Award(s)
Anita Baker	Lifetime Achievement Award to Stevie Wonder
Timothy Hutton	Lifetime Achievement Award to Dave Brubeck
Sheryl Crow & Andy Garcia	Best Pop Vocal Album
Shania Twain & Patty Loveless	Best Male Country Vocal Performance
The Mavericks	Best Female Country Vocal Performance
Lisa Kudrow & Chris Isaak	Best Hard Rock Performance
Mary J. Blige & Salt-N-Pepa	Best Rap Solo Performance
Brandy & Michael W. Smith	Best Contemporary Soul Gospel Album
Gloria Estefan & Tim Allen	Best New Artist
Tupac Shakur & Kiss	Best Pop Performance by Duo or Group with Vocals
Bonnie Raitt & John Raitt	Best Female Rock Vocal Performance
All-4-One & Celine Dion	Best Female Pop Vocal Performance
Toni Braxton & Babyface	Song of the Year
Mary Chapin Carpenter & Tony Bennett	Album of the Year
Vince Gill & Joni Mitchell	Record of the Year

== Award winners ==
=== General ===
Record of the Year

- "Kiss From a Rose" – Seal
  - Trevor Horn, producer
- "One Sweet Day" – Mariah Carey & Boyz II Men
  - Walter Afanasieff & Mariah Carey, producers
- "Gangsta's Paradise" – Coolio
  - Doug Rasheed, producer
- "One of Us" – Joan Osborne
  - Rick Chertoff, producer
- "Waterfalls" – TLC
  - Organized Noize, producer

Album of the Year

- Jagged Little Pill – Alanis Morissette
  - Glen Ballard, producer
- Daydream – Mariah Carey
  - Walter Afanasieff, Mariah Carey, Jermaine Dupri, Dave Hall, David Morales & Manuel Seal, producers
- HIStory: Past, Present and Future, Book I – Michael Jackson
  - Dallas Austin, Bill Bottrell, David Foster, Janet Jackson, Michael Jackson, Jimmy Jam, R. Kelly, Terry Lewis, René & Bruce Swedien, producers
- Relish – Joan Osborne
  - Rick Chertoff, producer
- Vitalogy – Pearl Jam
  - Brendan O'Brien & Pearl Jam, producers

Song of the Year

- "Kiss From a Rose"
  - Seal, songwriter (Seal)
- "I Can Love You Like That"
  - Maribeth Derry, Steve Diamond & Jennifer Kimball, songwriters (All-4-One)
- "One of Us"
  - Eric Bazilian, songwriter (Joan Osborne)
- "You Are Not Alone"
  - R. Kelly, songwriter (Michael Jackson)
- "You Oughta Know"
  - Glen Ballard & Alanis Morissette, songwriters (Alanis Morissette)

Best New Artist

- Hootie & the Blowfish
- Brandy
- Alanis Morissette
- Joan Osborne
- Shania Twain

=== Alternative ===
- Best Alternative Music Performance
  - Nirvana for MTV Unplugged in New York

=== Blues ===
- Best Traditional Blues Album
  - John Lee Hooker for Chill Out
- Best Contemporary Blues Album
  - Buddy Guy for Slippin' In

=== Children's ===
- Best Musical Album for Children
  - J. Aaron Brown, David R. Lehman (producers) & Barbara Bailey Hutchison for Sleepy Time Lullabys
- Best Spoken Word Album for Children
  - Dan Broatman, Martin Sauer (producers) & Patrick Stewart for Prokofiev: Peter and the Wolf

=== Classical ===
- Best Orchestral Performance
  - Pierre Boulez (conductor) & the Cleveland Orchestra for Debussy: La Mer
- Best Classical Vocal Performance
  - Christopher Hogwood (conductor), Sylvia McNair & the Academy of Ancient Music for The Echoing Air – The Music of Henry Purcell
- Best Opera Recording
  - Raymond Minshull (producer), Charles Dutoit (conductor), Gary Lakes, Françoise Pollet, Gino Quilico, Deborah Voigt & L'Orchestre Symphonique de Montréal & Chorus for Berlioz: Les Troyens
- Best Choral Performance
  - Herbert Blomstedt (conductor), Vance George (choir director) & the San Francisco Symphony Orchestra & Chorus for Brahms: Ein Deutsches Requiem
- Best Instrumental Soloist(s) Performance (with orchestra)
  - Seiji Ozawa (conductor), Itzhak Perlman & the Boston Symphony Orchestra for The American Album – Works of Bernstein, Barber, Foss
- Best Instrumental Soloist Performance (without orchestra)
  - Radu Lupu for Schubert: Piano Sonatas (B-flat major and A major)
- Best Chamber Music Performance
  - Emanuel Ax, Yo-Yo Ma & Richard Stoltzman for Brahms/Beethoven/Mozart: Clarinet Trios
- Best Classical Contemporary Composition
  - Olivier Messiaen (composer) & Myung-whun Chung (conductor) for Messiaen: Concert a Quatre
- Best Classical Album
  - Karl-August Naegler (producer), Pierre Boulez (conductor) & the Cleveland Orchestra & Chorus for Debussy: La Mer; Nocturnes; Jeux

=== Comedy ===
- From 1994 through 2003, see "Best Spoken Comedy Album" under the "Spoken" field, below.

=== Composing and arranging ===
- Best Instrumental Composition
  - Bill Holman (composer) for "A View From the Side" performed by The Bill Holman Band
- Best Song Written Specifically for a Motion Picture or for Television
  - Alan Menken & Stephen Schwartz (songwriters) for "Colors of the Wind" performed by Vanessa Williams
- Best Instrumental Composition Written for a Motion Picture or for Television
  - Hans Zimmer (composer) for Crimson Tide
- Best Instrumental Arrangement
  - Robert Farnon (arranger) for "Lament" performed by J. J. Johnson & the Robert Farnon Orchestra
- Best Instrumental Arrangement with Accompanying Vocal(s)
  - Rob McConnell (arranger) for "I Get a Kick Out of You" performed by Mel Tormé with Rob McConnell & The Boss Brass

=== Country ===
- Best Female Country Vocal Performance
  - Alison Krauss for "Baby, Now That I've Found You"
- Best Male Country Vocal Performance
  - Vince Gill for "Go Rest High on That Mountain"
- Best Country Performance by a Duo or Group with Vocal
  - The Mavericks for "Here Comes the Rain"
- Best Country Collaboration with Vocals
  - Alison Krauss & Shenandoah for "Somewhere in the Vicinity of the Heart"
- Best Country Instrumental Performance
  - Asleep at the Wheel, Béla Fleck & Johnny Gimble for "Hightower"
- Best Country Song
  - Vince Gill (songwriter) for "Go Rest High on That Mountain"
- Best Country Album
  - Robert John "Mutt" Lange (producer) & Shania Twain for The Woman in Me
- Best Bluegrass Album
  - The Nashville Bluegrass Band for Unleashed

=== Folk ===
- Best Traditional Folk Album
  - Ramblin' Jack Elliott for South Coast
- Best Contemporary Folk Album
  - Emmylou Harris for Wrecking Ball

=== Gospel ===
- Best Pop/Contemporary Gospel Album
  - Michael W. Smith for I'll Lead You Home
- Best Rock Gospel Album
  - Ashley Cleveland for Lesson of Love
- Best Traditional Soul Gospel Album
  - Shirley Caesar for Shirley Caesar Live – He Will Come
- Best Contemporary Soul Gospel Album
  - CeCe Winans for Alone In His Presence
- Best Southern Gospel, Country Gospel or Bluegrass Gospel Album
  - Bill Hearn (producer) for Amazing Grace – A Country Salute to Gospel performed by various artists
- Best Gospel Album by a Choir or Chorus
  - Carol Cymbala (choir director) for Praise Him – Live! performed by the Brooklyn Tabernacle Choir

=== Historical ===
- Best Historical Album
  - John Pfeiffer (producer & notes writer), Ray Hall, Thomas MacCluskey, James P. Nichols, Anthony Salvatore, Jon M. Samuels, David Satz (engineers), J.J. Stelmach (art director), Gabriel Banat, Grant Beglarian, Robert Cowan, Mortimer W. Frank, Richard Freed, Erick Friedman, Harris Goldsmith, Josefa Heifetz, George Jellinek, Irving Kolodin, Jacob Lateiner, Laurence Lesser, Myra C. Livingston, John Maltese, John Anthony Maltese, Leonard Pennario & Brooks Smith (notes writers) for The Heifetz Collection performed by Jascha Heifetz & various artists

=== Jazz ===
- Best Jazz Instrumental Solo
  - Michael Brecker for "Impressions"
- Best Jazz Instrumental Performance, Individual or Group
  - McCoy Tyner Trio & Michael Brecker for "Infinity"
- Best Large Jazz Ensemble Performance
  - Tom Scott for "All Blues" performed by the GRP All-Star Big Band
- Best Jazz Vocal Performance
  - Lena Horne for An Evening with Lena Horne
- Best Contemporary Jazz Performance
  - Pat Metheny Group for "We Live Here"
- Best Latin Jazz Performance
  - Jobim for Antonio Brasileiro

=== Latin ===
- Best Latin Pop Performance
  - Jon Secada for Amor
- Best Tropical Latin Performance
  - Gloria Estefan for Abriendo Puertas
- Best Mexican-American/Tejano Music Performance
  - Flaco Jiménez for Flaco Jiménez

=== Musical show ===
- Best Musical Show Album
  - Arif Mardin, Jerry Leiber, Mike Stoller (producers) & the original Broadway cast for Smokey Joe's Cafe – The Songs of Leiber & Stoller

=== Music video ===
- Best Music Video, Short Form
  - Ceán Chaffin (producer), Mark Romanek (director), Janet Jackson & Michael Jackson for "Scream"
- Best Music Video, Long Form
  - Robert Warr (producer), François Girard (director) & Peter Gabriel for Secret World Live

=== New Age ===
- Best New Age Album
  - George Winston for Forest

=== Packaging and notes ===
- Best Recording Package
  - Joni Mitchell & Robbie Cavolina (art directors) for Turbulent Indigo performed by Joni Mitchell
- Best Recording Package – Boxed
  - Frank Zappa & Gail Zappa (art directors) for Civilization Phaze III performed by Frank Zappa
- Best Album Notes
  - Rob Bowman (notes writer) for The Complete Stax/Volt Soul Singles, Vol. 3: 1972–1975 performed by various artists

=== Polka ===
- Best Polka Album
  - Jimmy Sturr for I Love to Polka

=== Pop ===
Best Female Pop Vocal Performance

- "No More 'I Love You's'" – Annie Lennox
- "Fantasy" – Mariah Carey
- "I Know" – Dionne Farris
- "One of Us" – Joan Osborne
- "You Got It" - Bonnie Raitt
- "Colors of the Wind" – Vanessa Williams

Best Male Pop Vocal Performance

- "Kiss From a Rose" – Seal
- "Have You Ever Really Loved a Woman?" – Bryan Adams
- "You Are Not Alone" – Michael Jackson
- "Believe" – Elton John
- "When We Dance" – Sting

Best Pop Performance by a Duo or Group with Vocals

- "Let Her Cry" – Hootie & the Blowfish
- "I Can Love You Like That" – All-4-One
- "Love Will Keep Us Alive" – Eagles
- "I'll Be There for You" – The Rembrandts
- "Waterfalls" – TLC

Best Pop Collaboration with Vocals

- "Have I Told You Lately" – The Chieftains & Van Morrison
- "Someone to Love" – Jon B. featuring Babyface
- "When You Love Someone" – Anita Baker with James Ingram
- "One Sweet Day" – Mariah Carey and Boyz II Men
- "Scream" – Michael Jackson and Janet Jackson

Best Pop Instrumental Performance

- "Mariachi Suite" – Los Lobos
- "In Memory of Elizabeth Reed" – The Allman Brothers Band
- "Have Yourself a Merry Little Christmas" – Kenny G
- "Yesterday" – Dave Grusin
- "Song B" – Bruce Hornsby

Best Pop Album

- Turbulent Indigo – Joni Mitchell
  - Larry Klein, producer
- Daydream – Mariah Carey
  - Walter Afanasieff, Mariah Carey, Jermaine Dupri, Dave Hall, David Morales & Manuel Seal, producers
- Hell Freezes Over – Eagles
  - Eagles, Elliot Scheiner, Rob Jacobs, and Stan Lynch, producers
- Medusa – Annie Lennox
  - Stephen Lipson, producer
- Bedtime Stories – Madonna
  - Madonna, Dallas Austin, Babyface, Dave Hall, and Nellee Hooper, producers

=== Production and engineering ===
- Best Engineered Album, Non-Classical
  - David Bianco, Jim Scott, Richard Dodd & Stephen McLaughlin (engineers) for Wildflowers performed by Tom Petty
- Best Engineered Album, Classical
  - Jonathan Stokes, Michael Mailes (engineers), Herbert Blomstedt (conductor) & the San Francisco Symphony for Bartók: Concerto for Orchestra; Kossuth – Symphonic Poem
- Producer of the Year
  - Babyface
- Classical Producer of the Year
  - Steven Epstein

=== R&B ===
- Best Female R&B Vocal Performance
  - Anita Baker for "I Apologize"
- Best Male R&B Vocal Performance
  - Stevie Wonder for "For Your Love"
- Best R&B Performance by a Duo or Group with Vocal
  - TLC for "Creep"
- Best R&B Song
  - Stevie Wonder (songwriter) for "For Your Love"
- Best R&B Album
  - TLC for CrazySexyCool

=== Rap ===
Best Rap Solo Performance

- "Gangsta's Paradise" – Coolio
- "Keep Their Heads Ringin'" – Dr. Dre
- "Big Poppa" – The Notorious B.I.G.
- "I Wish" – Skee-Lo
- "Dear Mama" – 2Pac

Best Rap Performance by a Duo or Group

- "I'll Be There for You/You're All I Need to Get By" – Method Man featuring Mary J. Blige
- "1st of tha Month" – Bone Thugs-n-Harmony
- "Throw Your Set in the Air" – Cypress Hill
- "Feel Me Flow" – Naughty by Nature
- "What Would You Do?" – Tha Dogg Pound

Best Rap Album

- Poverty's Paradise – Naughty by Nature
- E. 1999 Eternal – Bone Thugs-n-Harmony; D.J. U-Neek, producer
- Return to the 36 Chambers: The Dirty Version – Ol' Dirty Bastard; the RZA, producer
- I Wish – Skee-Lo; Walter "Kandor" Kahn & Skee-Lo, producers
- Me Against the World – 2Pac

=== Reggae ===
- Best Reggae Album
  - Shaggy for Boombastic

=== Rock ===
- Best Female Rock Vocal Performance
  - Alanis Morissette for "You Oughta Know"
- Best Male Rock Vocal Performance
  - Tom Petty for "You Don't Know How It Feels"
- Best Rock Performance by a Duo or Group with Vocal
  - Blues Traveler for "Run-Around"
- Best Rock Instrumental Performance
  - Allman Brothers Band for "Jessica"
- Best Hard Rock Performance
  - Pearl Jam for "Spin the Black Circle"
- Best Metal Performance
  - Nine Inch Nails for "Happiness in Slavery"
- Best Rock Song
  - Alanis Morissette & Glen Ballard (songwriters) for "You Oughta Know" performed by Alanis Morissette
- Best Rock Album
  - Glen Ballard (producer) & Alanis Morissette for Jagged Little Pill

=== Spoken ===
- Best Spoken Word or Non-musical Album
  - Maya Angelou for Phenomenal Woman
- Best Spoken Comedy Album
  - Jonathan Winters for Crank(y) Calls

=== Traditional pop ===
- Best Traditional Pop Vocal Performance
  - Frank Sinatra for Duets II

=== World ===
- Best World Music Album
  - Deep Forest for Boheme

== Special merit awards ==
=== MusiCares Person of the Year ===
- Quincy Jones
