= Polka in Paradise =

Studio album by Jimmy Sturr and His Orchestra
- Released: July 11, 2006
- Genre: Polka
- Label: Rounder

Polka in Paradise is an album by Jimmy Sturr and His Orchestra, released through Rounder Records on July 11, 2006. In 2007, the album won Sturr the Grammy Award for Best Polka Album.

== Track listing ==
1. "Put a Light in the Window" (Jacobson, Roberts) – 3:18
2. "Monopol" – 3:20
3. "Polka in Paradise" (Bloom, Wing) – 2:49
4. "Wake Me Up Early in the Morning" (Lord) – 2:07
5. "Give Me a Kiss (Daj Mi Buzi)" (Biglietta, Mechem, Seibert) – 2:46
6. "Dance with Me" (Marcarski) – 2:20
7. "Roll Out the Barrel One More Time" (Dini, Pick, Wing) – 2:08
8. "Zostalem Sam (Left Alone)" (Wojnarowski) – 3:08
9. "Accordions on Fire" – 2:01
10. "Miss Molly" (Walker) – 3:25
11. "Sweet Memories of Yesterday" (Martin, Trimper) – 3:34
12. "Ruby O'Reilly" (Wing) – 2:33
13. "Diamond Ring" (Henry) – 2:50

== Personnel ==
- Ray Barno Orchestra – Clarinet, Sax (Baritone)
- Phil Benenati – Cover Design
- Mark Capps – engineer
- Dennis Coyman – drums
- Ray DeBrown – arranger
- Nick Devito – Clarinet, Sax (Alto)
- Joe Donofrio – producer, mixing
- Gennarose – vocals
- Kenny Harbus – Trumpet
- R. Henry – composer
- Allen Henson – vocals (background), Group Member
- Ken Irwin – producer, mixing
- Kenny Jacobson – composer
- The Jordanaires – vocals (background)
- Johnny Karas – Sax (Tenor), Vocals
- Terry Kitchen – Liner Notes
- Dave Kowalski – assistant engineer
- Kevin Krauth – Trumpet
- Bobby Lord – composer
- Joe Magnuszewski – Clarinet, Sax (Alto)
- Phil Martin – composer
- Dr. Toby Mountain – Mastering
- Louis Dean Nunley – vocals (background), Group Member
- Eric Parks – Trumpet
- Rich Pavasaris – bass, bass (Electric)
- Al Piatkowski – Accordion
- Tom Pick – composer, producer, engineer, mixing
- Mickey Raphael – Harmonica, Guest Appearance
- Rhoda Roberts – composer
- Nancy Seibert – composer
- Keith Slattery – piano
- Jimmy Sturr – vocals, mixing
- Steve "Rocky" Swiader – Accordion
- Frank Urbanovitch – Fiddle, Vocals
- Bobby Vinton – vocals, Guest Appearance
- Cindy Walker – composer
- Henry Will – arranger
- Lance Wing – composer
- Uno Bloom – composer
- Curtis Young – vocals (background), Group Member

== See also ==
- Polka in the United States
