= Come Share the Wine =

Studio album by Jimmy Sturr and His Orchestra
- Released: August 21, 2007
- Genre: Polka
- Label: Rounder

Professional ratings
Review scores
Source	Rating
Allmusic	3.5/5 stars

Come Share the Wine is an album by Jimmy Sturr and His Orchestra, released through Rounder Records on August 21, 2007. In 2008, the album won the group the Grammy Award for Best Polka Album.

== Track listing ==
1. "Dancin' with Rosie" (Mecham, Seibert, Vigetta) – 2:27
2. "Dominique" (Sœur Sourire) – 2:45
3. "Not Supposed To" (Mecham, Seibert, Vigetta) – 2:58
4. "Come Share the Wine" (Black, Jürgens, Kasha, Montana) – 3:34
5. "Red Wing" (Chattaway, Mills) – 2:12
6. "Small Town Memory Lane" (Wing) – 2:57
7. "Snappy Time" (Soyka) – 2:38
8. "I'm Gonna Steal Your Shoes" (Bryant, Bryant) – 2:00
9. "Bride and Groom" (Karnish) – 2:42
10. "Blind Date" (Henry) – 2:37
11. "My Girl" – 2:38
12. "Fiddles and Bows" (Driftwood) – 1:59
13. "Come Share the Wine" (Black, Jürgens, Kasha, Montana) – 2:56

== Personnel ==
- Ray Barno Orchestra – Clarinet, Sax (Alto), Sax (Baritone)
- Don Black – Composer
- Jerry Calhoun – Vocals, Guest Appearance
- Mark Capps – Engineer
- Thurland Chattaway – Composer
- Dennis Coyman – Drums
- Nick Devito – Clarinet, Sax (Alto)
- Joe Donofrio – Producer, Mixing
- Allen Henson – Vocals (background)
- Ken Irwin – Producer, Mixing
- The Jordanaires – Vocals (background)
- Johnny Karas – Sax (Tenor), Vocals
- Al Kasha – Composer
- Dave Kowalski – Assistant Engineer
- Kevin Krauth – Trumpet
- Joe Magnuszewski – Clarinet, Sax (Alto)
- Dr. Toby Mountain – Mastering
- Louis Dean Nunley – Vocals (background)
- Eric Parks – Trumpet
- Rich Pavasaris – Bass
- Al Piatkowski – Accordion
- Tom Pick – Producer, Engineer, Mixing, Overdub Engineer
- Nancy Seibert – Composer
- Keith Slattery – Piano
- Soeur Sourire – Composer
- Keith G. Stras – Liner Notes
- Jimmy Sturr – Mixing
- Steve "Rocky" Swiader – Accordion
- Dana Sylvander – Trombone
- Frank Urbanovitch – Fiddle, Vocals
- Terry Waddell – Arranger
- Henry Will – Arranger
- Lance Wing – Composer
- Curtis Young – Vocals (background)

== See also ==
- Polka in the United States
