= Let's Polka 'Round =

Studio album by Jimmy Sturr and His Orchestra
- Released: August 26, 2003
- Genre: Polka
- Label: Rounder

Professional ratings
Review scores
Source	Rating
Allmusic	1.5/5 stars

Let's Polka 'Round is an album by Jimmy Sturr and His Orchestra, released through Rounder Records on August 26, 2003. In 2004, the album won Sturr the Grammy Award for Best Polka Album.

== Track listing ==
1. "Polka Round" (Wing) – 2:18
2. "Night Train to Memphis" (Bradley, Hughes, Smith) – 2:38
3. "Lawn Party" – 2:02
4. "Polka on the Banjo" – 3:34 (Bela Fleck)
5. "Yakety Sax" (Boots Randolph, Rich) – 2:19
6. "Laura's" – 2:22
7. "Together You and I" (Dolly Parton) – 2:23
8. "Charlie Was a Boxer" – 2:36
9. "I'm Walkin'" (Dave Bartholomew, Fats Domino) – 2:40
10. "You Came into My Life" – 4:11
11. "Lucky Seven" – 2:11
12. "Tavern in the Town" – 2:07
13. "Little Felix" – 3:20

== Personnel ==
- Scott Alarik – Liner Notes
- Joe Babcock – vocals (background)
- Ray Barno Orchestra – Clarinet, Sax (Baritone), Group Member
- Dave Bartholomew – composer
- Blue Highway – vocals (background)
- Bradley – composer
- Mark Capps – Assistant
- Michael Cleveland – Fiddle, Group Member
- Dennis Coyman – drums, Group Member
- Wally Czerniawski – Accordion, Arranger, Group Member
- Charlie Daniels – vocals, Guest Appearance
- Ray DeBrown – arranger
- Nick Devito – Clarinet, Sax (Alto), Group Member
- Fats Domino – composer
- Joe Donofrio – producer, mixing
- Béla Fleck – Guest Appearance
- Rod Fletcher – vocals (background)
- Dave Grego – bass, Group Member
- Ken Harbus – Trumpet, Group Member
- Allen Henson – vocals (background)
- Bobby Hicks – Fiddle, Group Member
- Marvin Hughes – composer
- Ken Irwin – producer, mixing
- Johnny Karas – Sax (Tenor), Vocals, Group Member
- Dave Kowalski – engineer
- Shawn Lane – Guest Appearance, Group Member
- Dr. Toby Mountain – Mastering
- Mrs. T's Pierogies – Author
- Al Noble – Trumpet, Group Member
- Louis Dean Nunley – vocals (background)
- Eric Parks – Trumpet, Group Member
- Dolly Parton – composer
- Al Piatkowski – Accordion, Group Member
- Tom Pick – producer, engineer, mixing
- Boots Randolph – composer, Guest Appearance
- James Rich – composer
- Keith Slattery – piano
- Harry Beasley Smith – composer
- Tim Stafford – Guest Appearance, Group Member
- Gerry Stavisky – Clarinet, Sax (Alto), Group Member
- Ron Stewart – Fiddle, Group Member
- Jimmy Sturr – arranger, Conductor, Producer, Mixing
- Wayne Taylor – Guest Appearance, Group Member
- Frank Urbanovitch – Fiddle, Vocals
- Jeremy Welch – Assistant
- Henry Will – arranger
- Dennis Wilson – vocals (background)
- Lance Wing – composer

== See also ==
- Polka in the United States
