= Touched by a Polka =

Studio album by Jimmy Sturr
- Released: August 15, 2000
- Genre: Polka
- Label: Rounder

Professional ratings
Review scores
Source	Rating
Allmusic	3/5 stars

Touched by a Polka is an album by Jimmy Sturr, released through Rounder Records on August 15, 2000. In 2001, the album won Sturr the Grammy Award for Best Polka Album.

== Track listing ==
1. "Tic Toc" – 3:13
2. "If You've Got the Money (I've Got the Time)" (Jim Beck, Lefty Frizzell) – 2:10
3. "Melody" (Sturr) – 2:53
4. "St. Patty's Polka Melody" – 4:00
5. "If I Could Catch a Rainbow" (Sturr, Will) – 2:08
6. "San Antonio Rose" (Bob Wills) – 3:14
7. "Don't Cry Daddy" (Wojnarowski) – 3:08
8. "Little Girl of Mine" (Corcoran) – 3:30
9. "Thibodeaux and His Cajun Band" (Newman) – 2:07
10. "Time Changes Everything" (Tommy Duncan) – 2:24

== Personnel ==
- Doyle Brown – visual coordinator
- Dennis Coyman – drums
- Wally Czerniawski – accordion
- Ray DeBrown – arranger
- Nick Devito – clarinet, alto saxophone
- Mel Ellis – performer
- Geoffrey Himes – liner notes
- Doug Howard – engineer
- Ken Irwin – mixing engineer
- The Jordanaires – backing vocals
- Johnny Karas – tenor saxophone, vocals
- Dr. Toby Mountain – mastering
- Al Noble – trumpet
- Dermot O'Brien – vocals
- Eric Parks – trumpet
- Tom Pick – producer, engineer, mixing engineer
- Keith Slattery – piano
- Jimmy Sturr – arranger, producer, mixing engineer
- Mel Tillis – vocals
- Frank Urbanovitch – fiddle, vocals
- Henry Will – arranger

== See also ==
- Polka in the United States
