= I Remember Warsaw =

Studio album by Jimmy Sturr
- Released: 1986
- Genre: Polka

I Remember Warsaw is an album by Jimmy Sturr and His Orchestra. The album won Sturr a Grammy Award for Best Polka Recording at the 29th Annual Grammy Awards (1987).

== See also ==
- Polka in the United States
