= When It's Polka Time at Your House =

Studio album by Jimmy Sturr and His Orchestra
- Released: 1991
- Genre: Polka
- Length: 30:11
- Label: Vanguard

Professional ratings
Review scores
Source	Rating
Allmusic	2.5/5 stars

When It's Polka Time at Your House is an album by Jimmy Sturr and His Orchestra, released through Vanguard Records in 1991. In 1991, the album won Sturr the Grammy Award for Best Polka Recording.

== Track listing ==
1. "Sleep All Day" (Jimmy Sturr, Will) – 2:07
2. "Tuba Polka" (Glowacki) – 2:43
3. "Break Out the Bottle" (Sturr, Will) – 1:36
4. "Box Fiddle Polka" – 1:54
5. "Carpenter Polka" (Wojnarowski) – 2:49
6. "Pulaski Highway Polka" – 2:46
7. "Jackpot Polka" (Wisniewski) – 2:32
8. "That Polka Melody" (Tady) – 2:26
9. "Just for You Waltz" (Nowack) – 3:30
10. "Sturr-It-Up Polka" (Urbanovitch) – 2:00
11. "Jolly Onion Polka" (Karnish) – 2:04
12. "Polka Time at Your House" (Sturr) – 1:52
13. "Fireball Mail" (Rose) – 1:52

== Personnel ==
- Gene Bartkiewicz – Accordion
- Louise Bialik – Accordion
- Tony Cicero – Drums
- Dennis Coyman – Drums
- Wally Czerniawski – Accordion
- Bob Fitzer – Bass
- Jeff Hoffman – Piano
- Gary Jacobelly – Artwork, Vocals
- Ethan James – Engineer
- The Jordanaires – Vocals
- Johnny Karas – Arranger, Performer, Sax (Tenor), Vocals
- Joe Magnuszewski – Clarinet, Sax (Alto)
- Ken Morey – Arranger
- Al Noble – Trumpet
- Eric Parks – Trumpet
- Tom Pick – Engineer, Mixing, Producer
- Dennis Polisky – Clarinet, Sax (Alto)
- Paul Roessler – Piano
- Jimmy Sturr – Arranger, Clarinet, Mixing, Performer, Producer, Sax (Alto)
- Jimmy Sturr and His Orchestra – Performer
- Frank Urbanovitch – Bass, Fiddle, Vocals
- Ken Uy – Piano, Synthesizer
- Henry Will – Arranger
- Joe Zarawski – Bass

== See also ==
- Polka in the United States
