= Live at Gilley's! =

Live album by Jimmy Sturr and His Orchestra
- Released: 1991
- Genre: Polka
- Label: Ranwood
- Producer: Jimmy Sturr

Professional ratings
Review scores
Source	Rating
Allmusic	3/5 stars

Live at Gilley's! is a live album by Jimmy Sturr and His Orchestra, released through Ranwood Records in 1991. In 1992, the album won Sturr the Grammy Award for Best Polka Album.

== Track listing ==
No.	Title	Writer(s)	Length
1.	"2001 Theme"	Richard Strauss	1:05
2.	"Riverhead Polka"	J. Resetar	2:38
3.	"Play Me Some Polka Music"	Jimmy Sturr	2:35
4.	"Fire on the Mountain Polka"	Sturr	2:50
5.	"Why Do I Have to Choose"	Willie Nelson	4:09
6.	"String of Pearls"	Jerry Gray	3:33
7.	"Hey Pretty Girl"		3:31
8.	"Blue Skirt Waltz"	Traditional	4:19
9.	"Clarinet Polka"	Traditional	3:23
10.	"Orange Blossom Special"	Ervin T. Rouse	2:21
11.	"Before They Take Me Away"	L. Zarski	3:22
12.	"Bird Dance"	Werner Thomas	2:37
13.	"Generals Polka"	Frank Wojnarowski	3:58
14.	"Ice Castles"	Marvin Hamlisch	3:46
15.	"Dixie - Closing"		4:45

== Personnel ==
- Gene Bartkiewicz – accordion
- Skip Bierstien – bass
- Dennis Coyman – drums
- Kent Crawford – art direction
- Johnny Karas – tenor saxophone, vocals
- Joe Magnuszewski – arranger, clarinet, alto saxophone
- Al Noble – trumpet
- Jim Osborn – trumpet
- Eric Parks – trumpet
- Tom Pick – engineer, mixing
- Jimmy Sturr – arranger, clarinet, producer, alto saxophone
- Jimmy Sturr and His Orchestra – performer
- Frank Urbanovitch – fiddle
- Ken Uy – piano
- Henry Will – arranger

== See also ==
- Polka in the United States
