= Living on Polka Time =

Studio album by Jimmy Sturr
- Released: 1997
- Genre: Polka
- Length: 35:55
- Label: Rounder

Professional ratings
Review scores
Source	Rating
Allmusic	4/5 stars

Living on Polka Time is an album by Jimmy Sturr, released through Rounder Records in 1997. In 1998, the album won Sturr the Grammy Award for Best Polka Album.

== Track listing ==
1. "Dear Hearts and Gentle People" (Fain, Hilliard) – 2:23
2. "Speedline" (Kuciemba) – 2:23
3. "(Hey Baby) Que Paso" (Meyers, Sheffield) – 3:45
4. "On the Swing" (traditional) – 2:10
5. "Always" (Henkler, Scholz, Sturr) – 2:38
6. "I Love Polka Music" – 2:40
7. "Sweet and Lovely" (Mack, Sturr) – 2:11
8. "Loving Arms of Tennessee" (Dempsey, Reed) – 2:51
9. "WWW Polka. Com" (DeBrown) – 3:03
10. "Hoop de Doo" (DeLugg, Loesser) – 3:26
11. "Bad Joe" (Wojnarowski) – 2:44
12. "Fiddlemania" (traditional) – 3:25
13. "Such a Way About You" (Meyer) – 2:16

== See also ==
- Polka in the United States
