= A Polka Just for Me =

Studio album by Jimmy Sturr and His Orchestra
- Released: 1987
- Genre: Polka

A Polka Just for Me is an album by Jimmy Sturr and His Orchestra released in 1987, featuring the Jordanaires. In 1988, the album earned Sturr the Grammy Award for Best Polka Recording.

== See also ==
- Polka in the United States
