= Top of the World (Jimmy Sturr album) =

Studio album by Jimmy Sturr
- Released: 2002
- Genre: Polka
- Label: Rounder

Professional ratings
Review scores
Source	Rating
Allmusic	2.5/5 stars

Top of the World is an album by Jimmy Sturr, released through Rounder Records in 2002. In 2003, the album won Sturr the Grammy Award for Best Polka Album.

== Track listing ==
1. "Top of the World" [Polka] (Bettis, Carpenter) – 3:27
2. "City of New Orleans" [Polka] (Goodman) – 3:24
3. "Streamline" [Polka] (Mayall, Mocarski) – 3:53
4. "The Little Shoemaker" [Polka] – 2:11
5. "Guacamole" [Polka] (Fender, Levy, Meyers) – 2:55
6. "Rocking Alone in an Old Rocking Chair" [Waltz] (Carvell) – 3:26
7. "This Land Is Your Land" [Polka] (Guthrie) – 2:35
8. "Metropole" [Polka] – 2:11
9. "No Fun Being Old" [Polka] (Karnish) – 3:37
10. "Patriotic Polka" [Polka] – 3:12
11. "The Devil Went Down to Georgia" [Polka] (Crain, Daniels, DeGregorio, Edwards) – 3:36
12. "Polka Paradise" [Polka] (Forsythe, Pick) – 1:48
13. "God Bless America Again" [Ballad] (Bare, Hawkins) – 2:49

== Personnel ==
- Mark Bernstein – Bass
- Mark Capps – Engineer
- Dennis Coyman – Drums
- Tom Crain – Composer
- Wally Czerniawski – Accordion
- Charlie Daniels – Composer
- Ray DeBrown – Arranger
- Taz DeGregorio – Composer
- Nick Devito – Clarinet, Sax (Alto)
- Joe Donofrio – Mixing
- Fred Edwards – Composer
- Nancy Given – Design
- Ken Harbus – Arranger, Trumpet
- Charlie Hayward – Composer
- Ken Irwin – Mixing, Producer
- Johnny Karas – Sax (Tenor), Vocals
- James Marshall – Composer
- John Mayall – Composer
- Dr. Toby Mountain – Mastering
- Al Noble – Trumpet
- Louis Dean Nunley – Vocals (Background)
- Eric Parks – Trumpet
- Al Piatkowski – Accordion
- Tom Pick – Engineer, Mixing, Producer
- David Royko – Liner Notes
- Keith Slattery – Arranger, Piano
- Gerry Stavisky – Clarinet
- Gordon Stoker – Vocals (Background)
- Jimmy Sturr – Mixing, Narrator, Photography, Producer
- Frank Urbanovitch – Arranger, Fiddle, Vocals
- Jeremy Welch – Engineer
- Henry Will – Arranger
- Curtis Young – Vocals (Background)
- Arlo Guthrie
- Rhonda Vincent

== See also ==
- Polka in the United States
