= Born to Polka =

Studio album by Jimmy Sturr and His Orchestra
- Released: 1989
- Genre: Polka

Born to Polka is an album by Jimmy Sturr and His Orchestra. In 1989, the album won Sturr the Grammy Award for Best Polka Recording.

== See also ==
- Polka in the United States
