= Gone Polka =

Studio album by Jimmy Sturr
- Released: September 25, 2001
- Genre: Polka
- Label: Rounder

Professional ratings
Review scores
Source	Rating
Allmusic	3.5/5 stars

Gone Polka is an album by Jimmy Sturr, released through Rounder Records on September 25, 2001. In 2002, the album won Sturr the Grammy Award for Best Polka Album.

== Track listing ==
1. "Yellow Rose of Texas Polka" – 2:52
2. "Sugar and Spice Polka" (Sturr) – 3:02
3. "Music! Music! Music! Polka" (Baum, Weiss) – 2:07
4. "Near the Town Polka" (Solek) – 2:05
5. "Waltz Across Texas Waltz" (Tawil, Tubb, Tubb) – 2:57
6. "Dancing Girl Oberek" – 2:15
7. "Ricochet Polka" (Coleman, Darion, Gimble) – 3:22
8. "Just Because Polka" (Robin, Shelton) – 2:17
9. "Hop Scotch Polka" – 2:19
10. "Big Mamou Polka" (Davis) – 2:44
11. "Poor Girl Polka" (Wojnarwoski) – 2:57
12. "On the Road Again Polka" (Nelson) – 2:10
13. "Sing Sing Sing" (Louis Prima) – 3:33

== Personnel ==
- Scott Alarik – liner notes
- Gene Bartkiewicz – accordion
- Mark Bernstein – bass
- Doyle Brown – visual coordinator
- Dennis Coyman – drums
- Wally Czerniawski – accordion, arranger
- Ray DeBrown – arranger
- Nick Devito – clarinet, alto saxophone, baritone saxophone
- Joe Donofrio – mixing
- Ken Harbus – trumpet
- Johnny Karas – clarinet, alto saxophone, vocals
- Brenda Lee – vocals
- Jean-Pierre LeGuillou – design
- Dr. Toby Mountain – mastering
- Willie Nelson – vocals
- Al Noble – trumpet
- Eric Parks – trumpet
- Al Piatkowski – accordion
- Tom Pick – producer, engineer, mixing
- Emil Shapach – assistant engineer
- Keith Slattery – piano
- Jimmy Sturr – producer, mixing
- Samir El Tawil – composer
- Frank Urbanovitch – fiddle, vocals
- Jim Uzwack – engineer
- Henry Will – arranger

== See also ==
- Polka in the United States
