= All in My Love for You =

Studio album by Jimmy Sturr and His Orchestra
- Released: 1990
- Genre: Polka

All in My Love for You is an album by Jimmy Sturr and His Orchestra. In 1990, the album won Sturr the Grammy Award for Best Polka Recording.

== See also ==
- Polka in the United States of America
