= Let the Whole World Sing =

Studio album by Jimmy Sturr and His Orchestra
- Released: August 5, 2008
- Genre: Polka
- Label: Rounder

Let the Whole World Sing is an album by Jimmy Sturr and His Orchestra, released through Rounder Records on August 5, 2008. In 2009, the album won the group the Grammy Award for Best Polka Album.

== Track listing ==
1. "Heartaches by the Number" (Harlan Howard) – 1:53
2. "Let the Whole World Sing It with Me" (Noe) – 1:53
3. "Suck It In" (Garrett) – 2:51
4. "Hank's Magic" (Sturr) – 3:49
5. "The Wedding Song" (Betteridge) – 2:40
6. "I Love You Because" (Leon Payne) – 1:57
7. "Stop What You're Doin'" (Mechem, Seibert, Viglietta) – 3:10
8. "Manhattan Spiritual" (Billy Maxted) – 2:50
9. "Polkaholic" (Harris, Wing) – 2:31
10. "Wojenko" – 3:11
11. "Connecticut Oberek" (Przasnyski) – 2:09
12. "Love and Laughter" (DiPreta, Prose) – 4:05
13. "Last Date" (Floyd Cramer) – 3:39
14. "Polka Sturred" (Wing) – 2:31

== Personnel ==
- Ray Barno Orchestra – Sax (baritone)
- Ian Betteridge – Composer
- Dennis Coyman – Drums
- Floyd Cramer – Composer
- Nick Devito – Clarinet, sax (alto)
- Joe Donofrio – Producer, mixing
- Pat Garrett – Composer
- Devon Guillery – Design
- Ted Harris – Composer
- Allen Henson – Vocals (background)
- Harlan Howard – Composer
- Ken Irwin – Producer, mixing
- The Jordanaires – Vocals (background)
- Johnny Karas – Sax (tenor), vocals
- Dave Kowalski – Engineer
- Kevin Krauth – Trumpet
- Joe Magnuszewski – Clarinet, sax (alto)
- Raul Malo – Vocals, guest appearance
- Billy Maxted – Composer
- Dr. Toby Mountain – Mastering
- Dale Noe – Composer
- Louis Dean Nunley – Vocals (background)
- Ted Olson – Liner notes
- Eric Parks – Trumpet
- Rich Pavasaris – Bass
- Leon Payne – Composer
- Al Piatkowski – Accordion
- Tom Pick – Producer, mixing, overdub engineer
- Nancy Seibert – Composer
- Keith Slattery – Piano
- Jimmy Sturr – Arranger, composer, mixing
- Steve "Rocky" Swiader – Accordion
- Dana Sylvander – Trombone
- Frank Urbanovitch – Fiddle, vocals
- Terry Waddell – Arranger
- Henry Will – Arranger
- Lance Wing – Composer, vocals, guest appearance
- Curtis Young – Vocals (background)

== See also ==
- Polka in the United States
