= Polka! All Night Long =

Studio album by Jimmy Sturr
- Released: 1996
- Genre: Polka
- Length: 36:46
- Label: Rounder

Professional ratings
Review scores
Source	Rating
Allmusic	4/5 stars

Polka! All Night Long is an album by Jimmy Sturr. It was released through Rounder Records in 1996. In 1997, the album won Sturr the Grammy Award for Best Polka Album.

== Track listing ==
1. "All Night Long" (Gimble, Wills) – 2:48
2. "Swirl" (Soyka, Sturr) – 3:15
3. "Tavern in the Town" (traditional) – 2:05
4. "Edelweiss" (Hammerstein, Rodgers) – 2:27
5. "Alice" (Chapman, Chinn) – 3:58
6. "Krakow Bridge") – 2:23
7. "Cajun Fiddle" (Rich) – 2:10
8. "Big Ball's in Cowtown" (Nix) – 2:46
9. "Dizzy Fingers" (Sturr) – 3:47
10. "Green Valley" (Wills) – 2:52
11. "My Sophie" (Wojnarowski) – 1:59
12. "Can't Afford to Be a Star" (Gerstenfeld, Lenard) – 2:48
13. "Alice [Rock Version]" (Chapman, Chinn) – 3:28

== See also ==
- Polka in the United States
