= Grammy Award for Best Polka Album =

Honor presented to recording artists for quality polka albums

- Awarded for: Quality polka albums
- Country: United States
- Presented by: National Academy of Recording Arts and Sciences
- First award: 1986
- Final award: 2008
- Website: grammy.com

The Grammy Award for Best Polka Album was an award presented at the Grammy Awards to recording artists for quality polka albums. Honors in several categories are presented at the ceremony annually by the National Academy of Recording Arts and Sciences of the United States to "honor artistic achievement, technical proficiency and overall excellence in the recording industry, without regard to album sales or chart position".

Originally called the Grammy Award for Best Polka Recording, the award was first presented to Frankie Yankovic in 1986. Previously, polka recordings had been placed in the folk category. While neither Billboard nor the Recording Industry Association of America tracked polka sales at the time the award category was introduced, polka musicians viewed its inclusion as a sign of respect and increasing popularity. In 1987, a tie vote resulted in awards being presented to Jimmy Sturr and His Orchestra for the album I Remember Warsaw as well as to Eddie Blazonczyk's Versatones for the album Another Polka Celebration. In 1992, the name of the category was changed to Best Polka Album. Beginning in 2001, award recipients included the producers, engineers, and/or mixers associated with the nominated work in addition to the recording artists. The academy retired the award category in 2009 to remain "relevant and responsive" to the music community.

Sturr holds the record for the most wins in this category, with a total of eighteen (including six as the leader of the group known as Jimmy Sturr and His Orchestra). Sturr also holds the record for the most consecutive Grammy wins. Walter Ostanek received the award three times consecutively, and the band Brave Combo was presented the award twice. American artists were presented with the award more than any other nationality, though it was presented to Ostanek and his band from Canada three times. Lenny Gomulka holds the record for the most nominations without a win, with twelve.

== Recipients ==
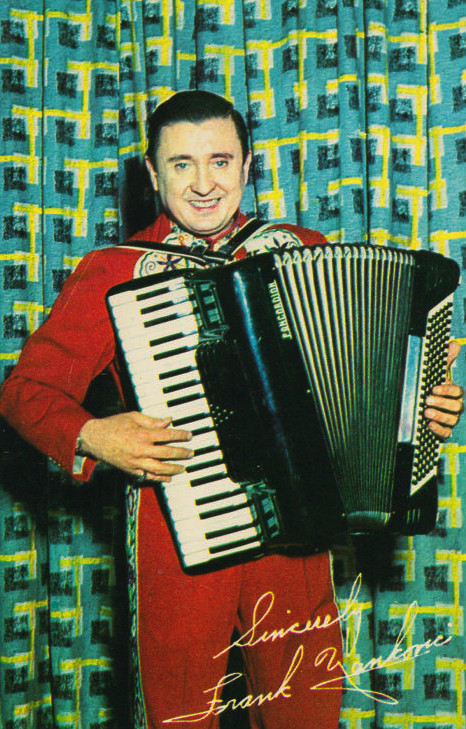
Frank Yankovic, the award's first winner

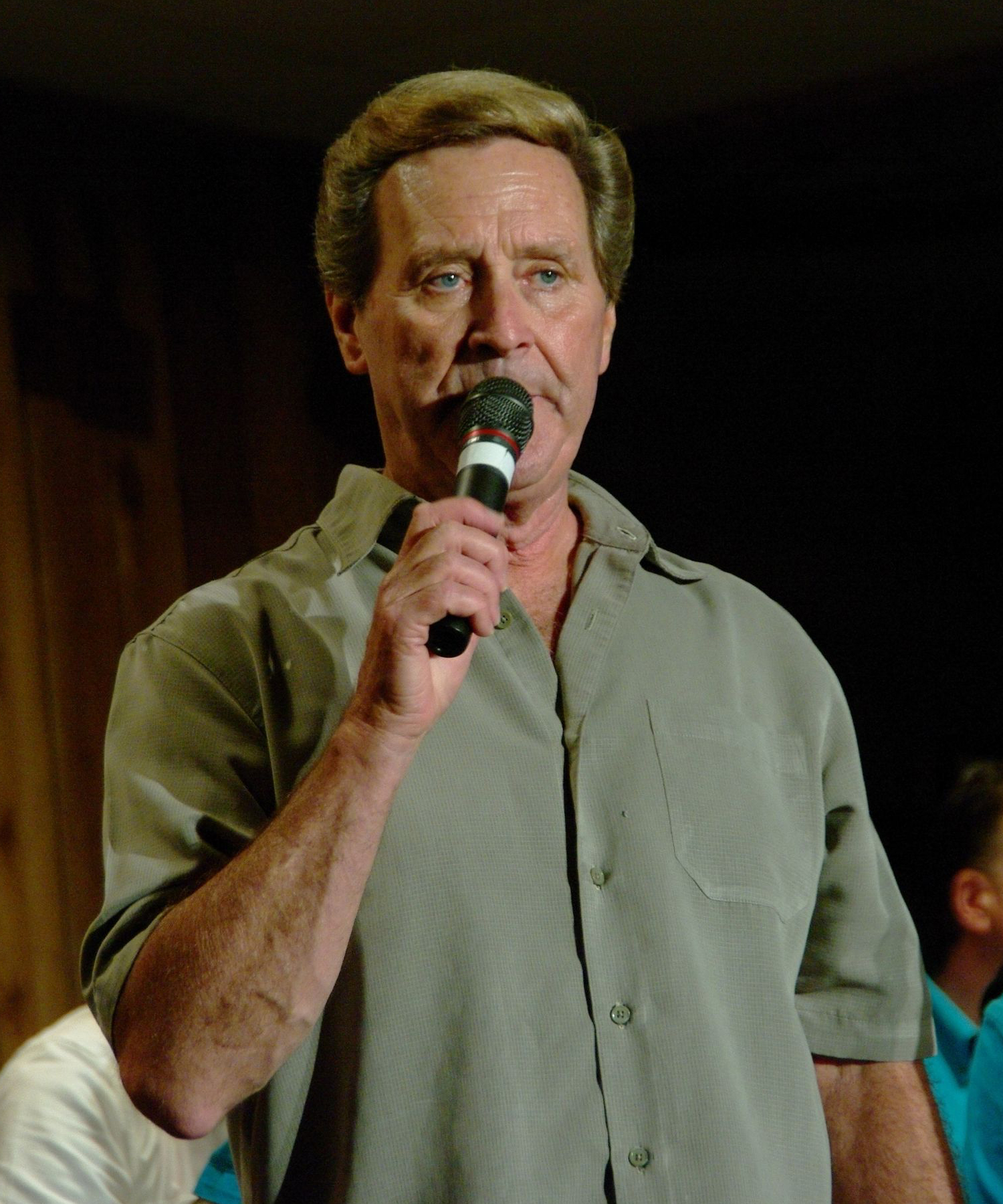
18-time winner Jimmy Sturr in 2009

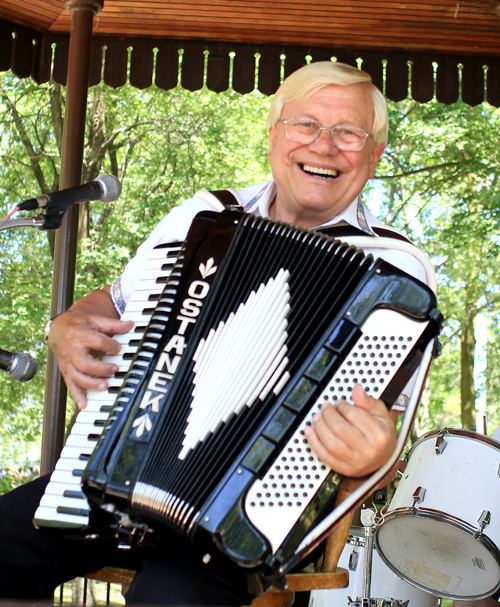
Three-time award winner Walter Ostanek in 2011

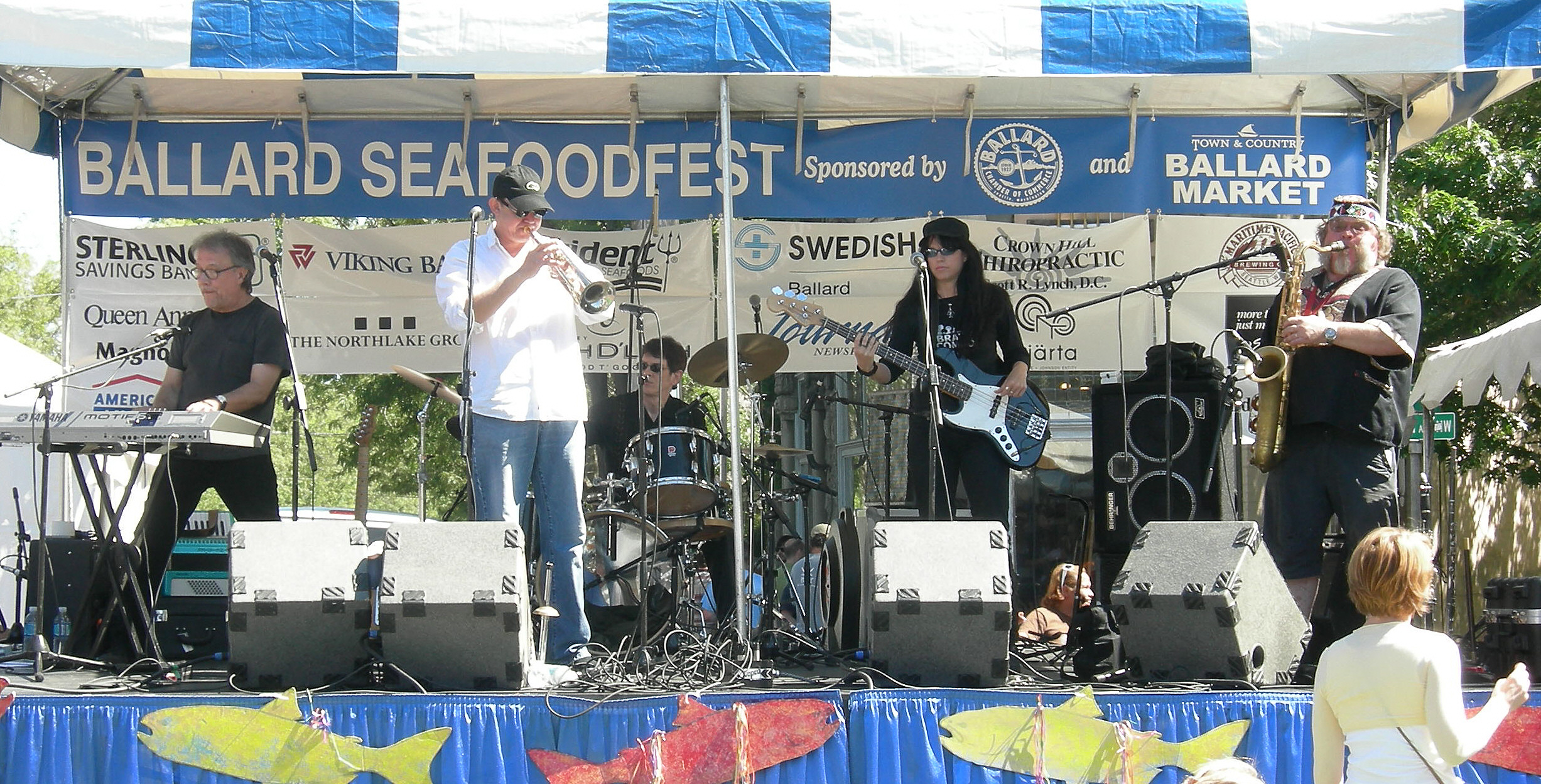
Members of the two-time award-winning band Brave Combo

*	Indicates a joint award for that year

Year^{[I]}	Performing artist(s)	Work	Nominees	Ref.
1986	Frankie Yankovic	70 Years of Hits	Brass Release – Brass with Class; Eddie Blazonczyk's Versatones – Polka Fireworks; Lenny Gomulka and the Chicago Push – Simply Polkamentary; Li'l Wally and Orchestra – Polskie Czucie, Polish Feelings	
1987*	Jimmy Sturr and His Orchestra	I Remember Warsaw	Frankie Yankovic – America's Favorites; Walter Ostanek and His Band - By Special Request; Hank Haller Ensemble - Thank You Dear and Give Her Roses	
1987*	Eddie Blazonczyk's Versatones	Another Polka Celebration	Frankie Yankovic – America's Favorites; Walter Ostanek and His Band - By Special Request; Hank Haller Ensemble - Thank You Dear and Give Her Roses	
1988	Jimmy Sturr	A Polka Just for Me	Eddie Blazonczyk's Versatones – Let's Celebrate Again; Lenny Gomulka and Dick Pillar – In Polka Unity; Walt Groller – It's Polkamatic; Kryger Brothers – Polka Mania	
1989	Jimmy Sturr	Born to Polka	Jimmy Weber and the Sounds – Sounds from a Polka Party; Lenny Gomulka's Chicago Push – Join the Polka Generation; Stas Bulanda's Average Polka Band – Let's Have a Party; Walter Ostanek and His Band – All Aboard It's Polka Time	
1990	Jimmy Sturr	All in My Love for You	Gene Mendalski and the G-Men – Moldie Oldie Golden Goodies; Gordon Hartmann – Polkaholic; Penn Ohio Polka Pals – Penn Ohio Polka Pals Souvenir Edition; Walter Ostanek and His Band – Any Time is Polka Time	
1991	Jimmy Sturr	When It's Polka Time at Your House	Eddie Blazonczyk's Versatones – Everybody Polka; Jimmy Weber and the Sounds – Sounds from the Heart; Polka Family Band – Fiddle Faddle; Toledo Polkamotion – Grand Illusion	
1992	Jimmy Sturr	Live at Gilley's!	Eddie Blazonczyk's Versatones – All Around the World; Walter Ostanek – A Wonderful World of Polkas and Waltzs; Polka Family Band – We Are Family; The Dynatones – When the Band Plays a Polka	
1993	Walter Ostanek and His Band	35th Anniversary	Dick Tady Orchestra – Happy Polka Days; Eddie Blazonczyk's Versatones – All American Country Flavored Polkas; Lenny Gomulka and the Chicago Push – Where Were You Back Then?; Jimmy Sturr – Sturr-It-Up	
1994	Walter Ostanek and His Band	Accordionally Yours	Eddie Blazonczyk's Versatones – A New Batch of Polkas; Jimmy Sturr and His Orchestra – Saturday Night Polka; Lenny Gomulka and the Chicago Push – Most Requested Hits; Polka Family Band – Polka Music Fan	
1995	Walter Ostanek Band	Music and Friends	Eddie Blazonczyk's Versatones – Always... Forever... and a Day; Happy Louie and Julcia's Polka Band – Your Polka Sweethearts; Jimmy Sturr and His Orchestra and Johnny Karas – Polka Your Troubles Away; Jan Lewan – Jan Lewan and His Orchestra	
1996	Jimmy Sturr	I Love to Polka	Brave Combo – Polkas for a Gloomy World; Eddie Blazonczyk's Versatones – Better Than Ever; Lenny Gomulka and Chicago Push – For Old Times Sake; Walter Ostanek – Happiness is Polkas and Waltzes	
1997	Jimmy Sturr	Polka! All Night Long	Eddie Blazonczyk's Versatones – Music, Music, Music!; Lenny Gomulka and Chicago Push – Irresistible You; Walter Ostanek and Friends – Putting It All To-Gether; Frankie Yankovic and Friends – Songs of the Polka King, Volume 1	
1998	Jimmy Sturr	Living on Polka Time	Lenny Gomulka and the Chicago Push – Home Is Where the Heart Is; John Gora and Gorale – Duty Free Polkas; Walter Ostanek – Moments to Remember; Frankie Yankovic and Friends – Songs of the Polka King	
1999	Jimmy Sturr and His Orchestra	Dance with Me	Brave Combo – Polka Party with Brave Combo: Live and Wild!; Del Sinchak Band – Let the Sunshine In; Lenny Gomulka and Chicago Push – Push It to the Limit; Walter Ostanek – Memories	
2000	Brave Combo	Polkasonic	Eddie Blazonczyk's Versatones – Smokin' Polkas; John Gora and Gorale – Follow Me; Jimmy Sturr and His Orchestra – Polkapalooza; Walter Ostanek – Yearning for Polkas and Waltzes	
2001	Jimmy Sturr	Touched by a Polka	Eddie Blazonczyk's Versatones – Another Day at the Office; Lenny Gomulka and Chicago Push – Mi Lenny Um; LynnMarie – SqueezeBox; Walter Ostanek – Let's Dance!	
2002	Jimmy Sturr	Gone Polka	Brave Combo – Kick-Ass Polkas; Eddie Blazonczyk's Versatones – Live and Kickin'; Lenny Gomulka and Chicago Push – Lenny Live; Walter Ostanek and His Band – Happy Times	
2003	Jimmy Sturr	Top of the World	Eddie Blazonczyk's Versatones – My Father's Shoes; Jerry Darlak and the Touch – Let the Good Times Roll; LynnMarie – The Polka Record; Walter Ostanek and His Band – Good Time Polkas and Waltzes	
2004	Jimmy Sturr	Let's Polka 'Round	Dennis Polisky and the Maestro's Men – Strike Up the Band; Eddie Blazonczyk's Versatones – Versalicious!; Jerry Darlak and the Touch – Polkas in Black and White; LynnMarie – LynnMarie and the Boxhounds; Walter Ostanek and Bob Kravos – Just for You	
2005	Brave Combo	Let's Kiss: 25th Anniversary Album	Eddie Blazonczyk's Versatones – Highways & Dancehalls; John Gora and Gorale – Pangora's Box; Henny and the Versa J's – Come on Over; Walter Ostanek and Gaylord Klancnik – Polkas United	
2006	Jimmy Sturr and His Orchestra	Shake, Rattle and Polka!	Del Sinchak Band – Polka Pizzazz; Eddie Blazonczyk's Versatones – Under the Influence; Walter Ostanek and Ron Sluga – Time Out for Polkas and Waltzes; Kevin Solecki – Solecktions	
2007	Jimmy Sturr and His Orchestra	Polka in Paradise	Eddie Blazonczyk's Versatones – Batteries Not Included; Lenny Gomulka and Chicago Push – As Sweet as Candy; LynnMarie and the Boxhounds – Party Dress; Walter Ostanek and Fred Ziwich – Good Friends Good Music	
2008	Jimmy Sturr and His Orchestra	Come Share the Wine	Brave Combo – Polka's Revenge; John Gora and Gorale – Bulletproof Polkas; Bubba Hernandez and Alex Meixner – Polka Freak Out; Walter Ostanek and His Band and Brian Sklar and the Western Senators – Dueling Polkas	
2009	Jimmy Sturr and His Orchestra	Let the Whole World Sing	Paulino Bernal – El Maestro del Acordeón y Sus Polkas; LynnMarie and Charlie Kelley as the Boxhounds – Speechless; Walter Ostanek and His Band, Jerry Darlak and The Touch, and Bob Kravos and His Band – Back to Back Hall of Fame Polkas; Polka Family Band – Hungry for More	

^{^[I]} Each year is linked to the article about the Grammy Awards held that year.

== Category retirement ==
In 2009, the National Academy of Recording Arts and Sciences announced the retirement of the award category. President and CEO Neil Portnow stated that the academy needed to do so in order to remain a "relevant and responsive" organization within a "dynamic music community". Polka musicians and fans were disappointed with the category elimination. Three-time award winner Walter Ostanek admitted he "[felt] sorry for the future artists" that would fail to be recognized by the academy. Carl Finch of the group Brave Combo stated the following: "Having a polka category was the most important step to legitimacy that we could ever hope to achieve. To have that taken away, it's like it was all for nothing." Apart from ensuring that the "awards process remains representative of the current musical landscape", the academy cited dwindling competition as one reason for the category retirement. Others speculated that Jimmy Sturr's eighteen wins led to the elimination. Due to the elimination of a polka-specific category, polka musicians are likely to submit recordings in the folk and world music categories.

In 2011, the Grammy Award organization announced a major overhaul of Grammy categories, lowering the number of awards from over 120 to just 78. Several regional American roots genres, such as Hawaiian music or Native American music, were combined in the new Best Regional Roots Music Album category, for which polka albums would also be eligible.

== See also ==
- List of Grammy Award categories
- Polka in the United States
- Polka Hall of Fame
- International Polka Association
