= Mark Capps =

American sound engineer and music producer (1968–2023)

- Born: December 14, 1968
- Died: January 5, 2023 (aged 54); Hermitage, Tennessee
- Occupation: Sound engineer
- Relatives: Jimmy Capps
- Family: Capps Family
- Awards: Grammy Award
- Website: markcapps.com

Mark Capps (December 14, 1968 – January 5, 2023) was an American sound engineer and music producer from Nashville, Tennessee. He shared the Grammy Award for Best Polka Album in 2005, 2006, and 2007 for engineering albums by Jimmy Sturr & His Orchestra.

Capps was part of a well-established musical family in Nashville. His father was Grand Ole Opry house band guitarist Jimmy Capps. He worked with country, gospel, and pop artists throughout his career.

He died after being shot in the doorway of his home by a member of a SWAT team responding to reports he had been holding his wife and adult stepdaughter hostage. He was 54 years old. He had been wanted on aggravated assault and aggravated kidnapping warrants.
