= Say Hello to Someone in Massachusetts =

1997 polka song by Lenny Gomulka

- Official polka of Massachusetts
- Music: Lenny Gomulka
- Published: 1997
- Adopted: October 1, 1998

"Say Hello to Someone in Massachusetts" is a polka song written by Lenny Gomulka about traveling to the U.S. state of Massachusetts and which describes some highlights of the state. After its release in 1997, it won awards from the polka community and fans successfully campaigned for it to be recognized as the official polka of Massachusetts.

== Inspiration ==
After Lenny Gomulka moved to western Massachusetts from Chicago in 1990, he thought it was a great state to write about. His goal was for the song to be a tribute to Massachusetts, though he didn't have any intentions of it being an official state song. Gomulka included a reference to the University of Massachusetts in the song in part because its Amherst campus college radio station WMUA often played polka music. He said about writing the song, "I take a lot of pride in being here in Massachusetts. I tried to write about the things that this area has—like beautiful scenery and warm handshakes."

== Release and reception ==
The song was released as the first track on the Grammy-nominated album Home is Where the Heart Is by Lenny Gomulka and the Chicago Push in 1997. Critic Jim Bessman named the album as one of the Top 10 of 1997. In January 1998, Joseph Kaczyk, ethnic programming director for Worcester community radio station WCUW, said that the song was popular enough for the station to get calls requesting it, and that it was smooth, danceable, and had a great melody. It was the winner in the "Favorite Song" category for the 1997 International Polka Association Music Awards as well as the United States Polka Association Song of the Year.

== Effort to designate as official polka of Massachusetts ==
Mitch Moskal, host of one of the polka programs on WMUA, was moved by Gomulka's love of Massachusetts and developed the idea to attempt to get it designated as the official polka of Massachusetts. State Rep. Paul E. Caron and State Sen. Stephen M. Brewer co-sponsored a bill in the state legislature to do so, saying that it would help honor Polish Americans in Massachusetts, and that polka music crosses cultural boundaries. In June 1998, over fifty fans of the song from the Springfield area took buses to the Massachusetts State House to support the bill at its legislative hearing. The dance was demonstrated at the hearing by Gomulka's wife Estelle who was wearing a traditional Polish costume, and the State Administration Committee approved the bill going forward. The bill passed unanimously. It was officially enacted on October 1, 1998, with a ceremonial signing on December 8, 1998, by acting governor Paul Cellucci, which added the designation to section 44 of Massachusetts General Law Chapter 2.
