= Dance with Me (Jimmy Sturr and His Orchestra album) =

Studio album by Jimmy Sturr and His Orchestra
- Released: 1998
- Recorded: Clinton Recording Studios, New York City
- Genre: Polka
- Label: Rounder Records

Professional ratings
Review scores
Source	Rating
AllMusic	4.5/5 stars
The Encyclopedia of Popular Music	3/5 stars

Dance with Me is an album by Jimmy Sturr and His Orchestra, released on August 18, 1998. In 1999, the album won Sturr the Grammy Award for Best Polka Album. Dance with Me was Sturr's 100th album.

== Critical reception ==
AllMusic wrote that the album "is a very good recording and should be enjoyed by those who enjoy first-rate dance music and can leap beyond the stereotype of polka music being only for the gray-haired generation."

== Track listing ==
1. "Make Mine Polka" (feat. The Oak Ridge Boys)
2. "My Polka Dot" (feat. The Jordanaires)
3. "Stellato's Polka"
4. "May All Your Dreams Come True" (feat. The Oak Ridge Boys)
5. "Papa Won't You Dance With Me" (feat. The Rocco Sisters)
6. "E-String Polka"
7. "Borracho #1"
8. "Ordinary Girl" (feat. The Oak Ridge Boys)
9. "Blue Star"
10. "In One Year (Za Rok)"
11. "Watch Your Step"
12. "Loretta" (feat. The Oak Ridge Boys)
13. "Wasn't That a Party" (feat. The Oak Ridge Boys)

Track listing adapted from the Apple Store

== See also ==
- Polka in the United States
