= I Love to Polka =

Studio album by Jimmy Sturr
- Released: 1995
- Genre: Polka
- Length: 35:01
- Label: Rounder

Professional ratings
Review scores
Source	Rating
Allmusic	2.5/5 stars

I Love to Polka is an album by Jimmy Sturr and His Orchestra, released through Rounder Records in 1995. In 1996, the album won Sturr the Grammy Award for Best Polka Album.

== Track listing ==
1. "It's Party Time" (Zalac) – 2:41
2. "Dancing Clarinets" (Sturr) – 2:14
3. "Bed of Roses" (Urbanovitch) – 2:34
4. "I L.O.V.E. Y.O.U." (Brown, Sturr) – 3:02
5. "Button Box Fever" (Rink) – 2:23
6. "Gettin' Married" (Biskup) – 2:28
7. "I Love to Polka" (Filipowski) – 3:10
8. "Nat the Cat" (Will) – 2:45
9. "My Mary" (Resetar) – 2:45
10. "Skylark" (Solek) – 2:47
11. "Last Night" (Rink) – 2:47
12. "Here We Come/The Polish Polka" (Sturr) – 2:40
13. "Blaze of Glory" (Keith, Morrison, Slate) – 2:45

== Personnel ==
- Gene Bartkiewicz – accordion
- Doyle Brown – visual coordinator
- Basia Ciborowski – vocals
- Dennis Coyman – drums
- Todd Culross – assistant engineer
- Wally Czerniawski – accordion
- Dave Czohara – trumpet
- Will Dombrowski – engineer
- Nancy Given – design
- Ken Harbus – trumpet
- The Jordanaires – vocals, group
- Johnny Karas – tenor saxophone, vocals
- Ella Kuzdzal – vocals
- Joe Magnuszewski – clarinet, alto saxophone
- Jeff Miller – piano
- Al Noble – trumpet
- Eric Parks – trumpet
- Tom Pick – producer, engineer, mixing
- Dennis Polisky – clarinet, alto saxophone
- Mike Ralff – bass
- Lenny Filipowski - pianist and composer
- Lynn Marie Rink – accordion
- Bill Shibilski – liner notes
- Jimmy Sturr – clarinet, arranger, alto saxophone, producer, mixing
- Frank Urbanovitch – fiddle, vocals
- Shonna Valeska – photography
- Henry Will – arranger
- Hank Williams – mastering

== See also ==
- Polka in the United States
