= Lenny Gomulka =

American musician, singer, songwriter, bandleader, composer, and publisher

Lenny Gomulka (born September 16, 1950, Chicago, IL) is an American polka musician, singer, songwriter, bandleader, composer, and publisher. He was born in Chicago and raised in the McKinley Park neighborhood. One of his bands, Lenny Gomulka and the Chicago Push, is popular for American & Polish-style and Chicago-style polkas. Gomulka has also collaborated numerous times with Eddie Blazonczyk Sr., Jimmy Sturr and others.

Lenny Gomulka is the author of "Say Hello to Someone in Massachusetts", the official polka of the State of Massachusetts. He is an inductee of the International Polka Association Hall of Fame, and a twelve-time Grammy Award nominee.
