= Jimmy Sturr =

American musician (born 1941)

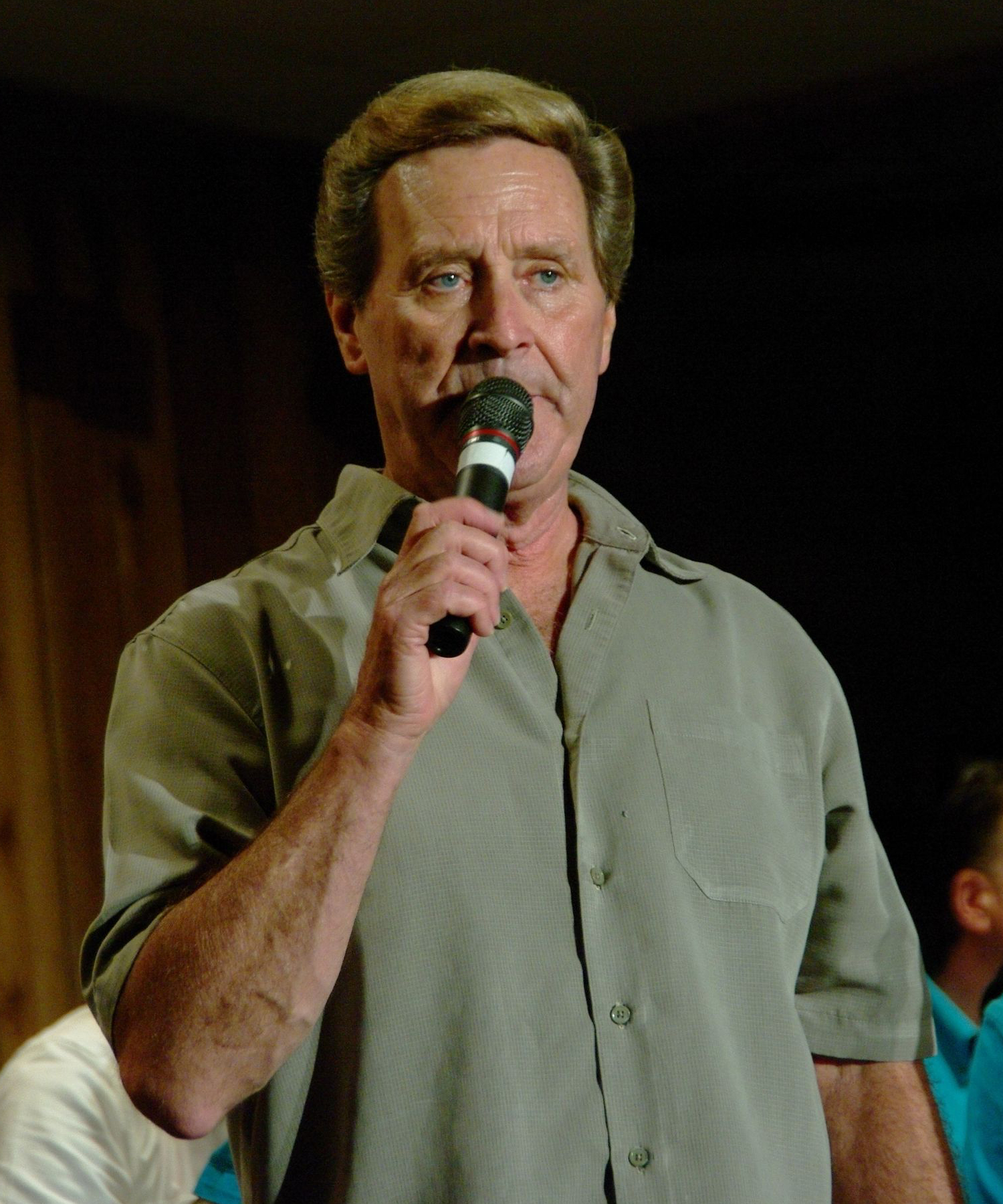
- Sturr in 2009

Background information
- Born: James William Sturr Jr. September 25, 1941 (age 85); Warwick, New York, United States
- Genres: Polka; folk; rock; country
- Occupations: Instrumentalist, bandleader
- Instruments: Trumpet, clarinet, saxophone
- Labels: Rounder, Vanguard, Starr
- Website: www.jimmysturr.com

James W. Sturr Jr. (born September 25, 1941), commonly known as Jimmy Sturr, is an American polka musician, trumpeter, clarinetist, saxophonist, and leader of Jimmy Sturr & His Orchestra. Media outlets have often dubbed him the "King of Polka," with his recordings having won 18 out of the 24 Grammy Awards given for Best Polka Album. Sturr's orchestra is on the Top Ten List of the All-Time Grammy Awards, and has acquired more Grammy nominations than anyone in the history of musical polka awards.

== Career ==
Sturr and his orchestra have performed at Carnegie Hall, Lincoln Center in New York City, Yankee Stadium and the Palace of Culture in Warsaw, Poland. When touring, the band rides in Jimmy's 45-foot customized tour bus, previously owned by Billy Ray Cyrus. The band has crossed genres and collaborated with numerous prominent musicians such as Willie Nelson, Brenda Lee, Arlo Guthrie, Boots Randolph, The Oak Ridge Boys, Mel Tillis, and Charlie Daniels.

A significant highlight for Jimmy Sturr & His Orchestra was when they were invited to appear on the Grand Ole Opry, the only polka group (and the only group with brass instruments) to do so.

Sturr hosts a syndicated radio show on stations including WTBQ in his hometown of Florida, New York, the station he once owned. He also has a weekly radio show on the Rural Radio channel on SirusXM. In addition to radio shows, he also owns and operates United Polka Artists, Starr Record Company, Jimmy Sturr Travel Agency, and a publishing company.

== Discography ==
- All American Polka Festival
- All in My Love for You (1990 Grammy)
- The Best of Jimmy Sturr and His Orchestra
- The Big Band Polka Sound
- Born to Polka (1989 Grammy)
- Come on and Dance (Live from RFD-TV) (2014)
- Come Share the Wine (2008 Grammy)
- Dance with Me (1999 Grammy)
- Double Magic
- First Class Polkas
- Forget Me Never
- Gone Polka with Willie Nelson, Brenda Lee (2002 Grammy)
- Gonna be Good Times (2017)
- Grammy Gold
- Greatest Hits of Polka
- I Love to Polka (1996 Grammy)
- I Remember Warsaw (1987 Grammy)
- A Jimmy Sturr Christmas
- Let the Whole World Sing (2009 Grammy)
- Let's Polka 'Round with Charlie Daniels, Bela Fleck, Boots Randolph (2004 Grammy)
- Life's a Polka
- Live at Gilley's! (1992 Grammy)
- Living on Polka Time with Bill Anderson, Flaco Jiménez (1998 Grammy)
- Most Requested Hits
- Not Just Another Polka
- Please Have Them Play a Polka Just for Me (1988 Grammy)
- Polka! All Night Long with Willie Nelson (1997 Grammy)
- Polka Christmas
- Polka Christmas in My Home Town
- Polka Cola (Music That Refreshes) with Bill Anderson (2009)
- Polka Fever (1978)
- Polka in Paradise with Bobby Vinton (2007 Grammy)
- Polka is My Life
- Polka Party
- Polkapalooza
- Primetime Polkas
- Pure Country
- Pure Polka
- Rock 'N' Polka
- Saturday Night Polka
- Shake, Rattle and Polka! (2006 Grammy)
- Stir Up a Musical Mix
- Sturr It Up
- Sturr Struck
- Top of the World with Arlo Guthrie, Rhonda Vincent (2003 Grammy)
- Touched by a Polka with Mel Tillis (2001 Grammy)
- Tribute to the Legends of Polka Music
- When It's Polka Time at Your House (1991 Grammy)

== Band members ==
Band Members

- Jimmy Sturr - Leader, Vocals, Clarinet, Saxophone, Drums, and Trumpet
- Johnny Karas - Tenor Saxophone and Vocals
- Nick DeVito - Clarinet, Alto Saxophone, and Piccolo
- Jim Perry - Clarinet and Alto Saxophone
- Frank Urbanovitch - Fiddle & Vocals
- Al Piatkowski - Accordion
- Bill Ash - Trumpet
- Vinnie Borselli - Trumpet
- Dana Sylvander - Trumpt
- Rich Berends - Drums
- Rich Pavasaris - Bass Guitar
- Ron Oswanski - Piano & Accordion
- Tom Conklin - Bus Driver and Sound Manager
- Mike Magdon - Sound Manager
- Rich Perry - Sound Engineer
- Gus Kosior - Manager & Bus Driver
- Barbara James - Assistant Manager
- Joe Rapp - Social Media

Reoccurring members

- Nick Koryluk - Accordion
- Joe Mariany - Clarinet and Saxophone
- Ray Barno - Clarinet, Alto Saxophone, and Baritone Saxophone
- Chris Caffery - Guitar
- Bryan Doolan - Equipment and Sound
- Frank Urbanovitch Jr. - Equipment and Sound

Past members

- William “Bill” Hulle - Bass
- Hank Golis - Trumpet
- Rick Henly - Trumpet
- Carl Hoynoski - Trumpet
- Kevin Krauth - Trumpet & Vocals
- Al Noble - Trumpet
- Ben Poole - Trumpet
- Eric Parks - Trumpet
- Paul Ketterer - Trumpet
- Kenny Harbus - Trumpet & Vocals
- Dennis Coyman - Drums
- Bill Langan - Bass Guitar
- Mike Ralff - Bass Guitar
- Dave Kowalski - Guitar
- Eddie Burton - Guitar
- Lou Pallo - Guitar
- Kevin Chase - Guitar
- Walt Cunningham - Strings & Banjo
- Ed Goldberg - Piano & Bass
- Jeff Hoffman - Piano
- Jeff Miller - Piano
- Keith Slattery - Piano
- Lenny Filipowski - Piano
- Dennis Polisky - Clarinet & Alto Saxophone
- Greg Dolecki - Clarinet & Alto Saxophone
- Joe Magnuszewski - Clarinet & Alto Saxophone
- Peter Kargul - Violin
- Ryan Joseph - Violin
- Steve Wnuk - Violin
- Gene Bartkiewicz - Accordion
- Wally Czerniawski - Accordion
- Darlene Morrow - Violin
- Mark Zaki - Violin
- Steve Swiader - Accordion
- Gennarose - Vocals
- Lance Wing - Vocals
- Lindsey Webster - Vocals
- John Doolan - Equipment Manager
- Thomas 'Tom' Karas - Accordion/keyboard
