= Polka in the United States =

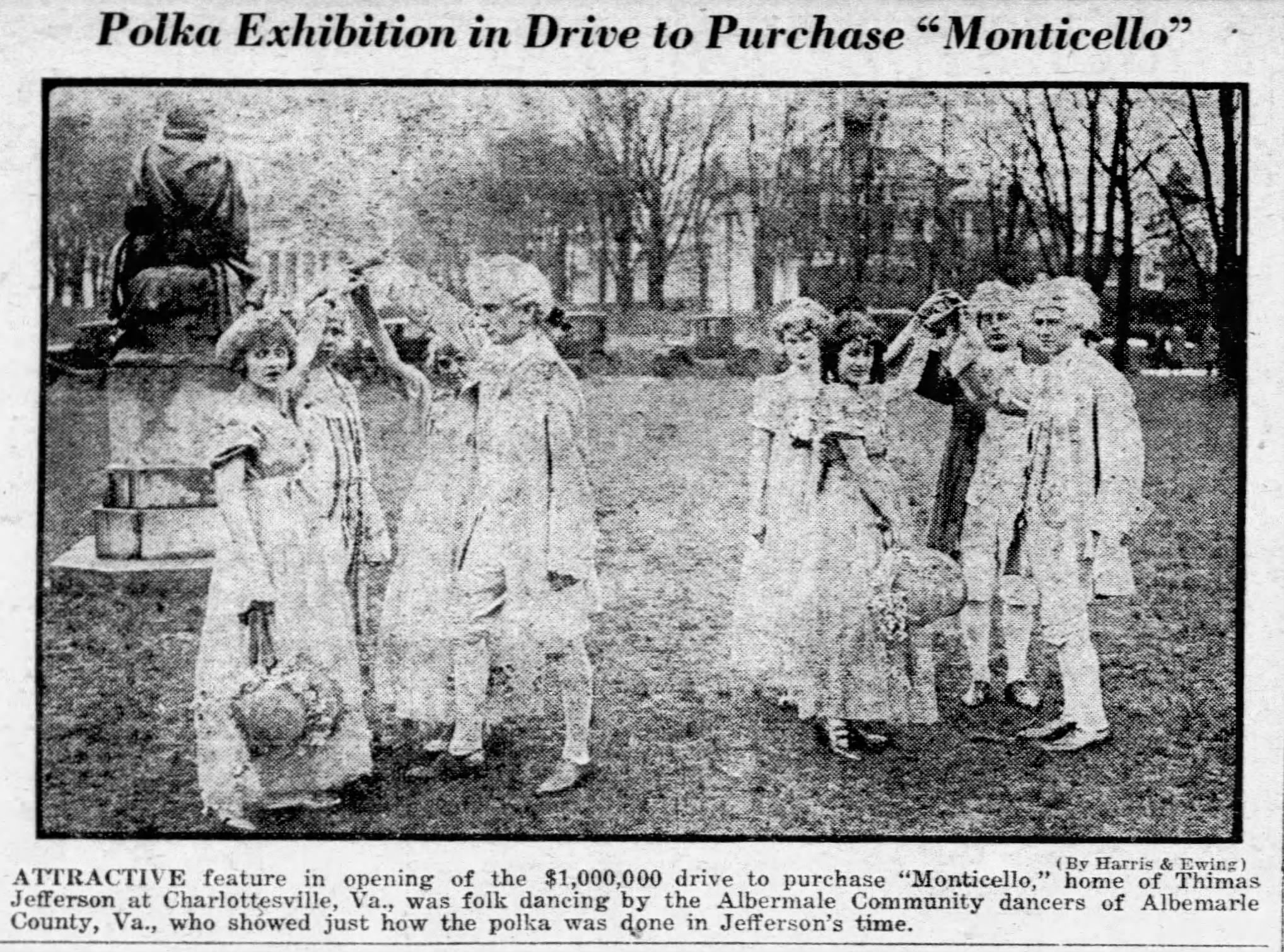
"Attractive feature in opening of the $1,000,000 drive to purchase Monticello, home of Thomas Jefferson at Charlottesville, Va., was folk dancing by Albemarle Community dancer of Albemarle County, Va., who showed just how the polka was done in Jefferson's time"

Polka is a music and dance style that originated in Bohemia in the 1830s and came to American society with immigrants from Europe. A fast style in 2/4 time, and often associated with the pre–World War II era, polka remains a dynamic niche music in America.

== Description ==
Several polka genres exist in the United States, each with its own unique characteristics and performers. Though these polka genres vary, all are unified in the expression of ethnicity by performers and participants. Polka enthusiasts gather to enjoy their love of the music and dance and to honor their heritage at polka festivals. Modern media enables these fans to stay connected and share their passion. Though it passed its heyday in the 1950s the polka remains an active music form with distinct genres, leading performers, and active organizations. Where it is popular, the polka is a manifestation of the culture of those who participate in it. It is the state dance of Wisconsin.

== Polka genres ==
Although author Charles Keil admits that "there are as many styles of polka as there are polka localities", he and his wife in their 2005 Ethnomusicology Forum article divided American polka music into three major genres:

1. Slavic, with its subgenres, Czech-American, Polish-American, and Slovenian-American
2. Germanic, with its subgenres, German-American
3. Southwestern, with its subgenres, Mexican-American and Papago-Pima

The two Slavic genres are found primarily in eastern and midwestern America, the Germanic genres in midwestern and western America, and the Southwestern genres in southwestern America. The different genres are united by the characteristic 2/4 time signature that exists in all polkas as well as by instruments and lyrics that are similar throughout all styles. Polka bands across all genres typically include an accordion or concertina, wind instruments, and drums. The lyrics sung by these bands are united by their discussion of joy, religion, and ethnic culture. Differences stem from variations in instrumentation, tempo, and the popularity of the genre in various places.

=== Traditional polka subgenres ===
==== Czech-American ====
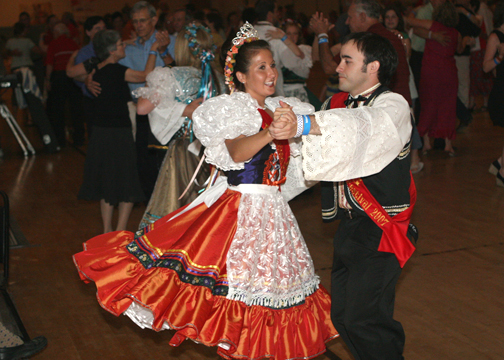
Polka dancers at the National Polka Festival in Ennis, TX

Czech-American style polka is found in Texas, Nebraska, and across the rural Midwest. In Texas a distinct Czexan (Texas Czech) sound evolved and has found the most commercial success. The Czexan sound is characterized by an accordion, bass guitar, saxophones and sometimes tubas. Generally the Czexan style has a prominent bass sound.

The Czexan sound is a mix of old world and new world elements. It is characterized by old world Czech melodies from folk songs form the 1800s-1950s, with some songs being Czech language compositions original to Texas. However considerable innovation and crossover with other cultures, namely the Mexican American Tejano culture and country western dancing have occurred which can set it apart from traditional Czech music in Europe and other diaspora communities.

The Czech music in other Czech American communities tends to be prominent but not as commercialized as Texas. In Nebraska, Oklahoma, and Kansas the style of Polka music is similar to the Texas Czechs, but in Wisconsin and Minnesota the big band brass style of polka is more prominent.

At its core Czech American polka music is dance music (polka, waltz, two step, čardaš) with many different local variations developing into distinct folk dances such as the: Seven Step Polka, Garden Waltz, and Schottische.

Historically dances were key to the cohesiveness of Czech American communities, and offered a safe space for Czech Americans. Today Czech American music is influenced by other accordion music (Tejano, Norteno, Cajun) as well as Czech and Slovak folk pop and Dechovka. Polka remains an enduring and evolving style of music core to the Czech American identity.

==== Polish-American ====
The Polish American Arts Festival, Cheektowaga

The Polish-American style of polka is perhaps the most popular today. Polish Polka bands not only play polkas, but also play obereks, waltzes, and sometimes tangos. In fact, the "Polish polka" as we know it was never danced in Poland. Rather, different forms of polka existed in Polish folk dancing. This popularity is due in part to the fact that performers in this genre have worked to appeal to a larger audience by adding covers of modern music alongside normal polkas in their albums and performances. For example, the polka band Toledo Polka Motion includes a cover of the Beatles' "I'm a Loser" along with traditional pieces such as "Pod Krakowem" on one of their albums. Polka star Jimmy Sturr has even included recordings with stars such as Willie Nelson to get the country music audience interested in polka. The hotspots for Polish-American polka are mostly in cities near the Great Lakes (especially Chicago, Detroit, and Milwaukee) and some East Coast cities.

Polish-American polka can be subdivided into Chicago-style and Eastern-style. The typical Chicago-style polka band includes one or two trumpets, an accordion, a concertina, drums, a bass, and sometimes a clarinet, saxophone, or fiddle. This style is connected to the '50s rock-and-roll era and is sometimes referred to as "push" style because of the intense "bellow-shaking" of the accordion. A secondary style of Chicago-style polka music is referred to as "honky" style; this consists of a trumpet, clarinet (doubling on saxophone), concertina or accordion, upright bass (or bass guitar), & drums. It is performed in a dixieland style, and sung primarily in the Polish language. Most polka artists add a piano on recordings for embellishment. The modern giants of Chicago-style are Lenny Gomulka and the late Eddie Blazonczyk. Both were highly influenced by the style of Li'l Wally Jagiello, a polka performer of an earlier generation. Another influential early pioneer of Chicago-style polkas was Marion Lush who has been called the "Golden Voice" of polkas due to his distinctive vocal stylings. (Lush died in 1993.) Blazonczyk was the leader of a band called the Versatones, who released over 50 albums. (Blazonczyk died in 2012.) Gomulka was a member of the Versatones until 1980 when he formed his own band, the Chicago Push. Some other popular modern Chicago-style polka bands include Crusade, the Polka Family, the Dynatones, and Toledo Polka Motion. An important venue for live performances of polka music was Club 505 at 13505 S Brainard Ave in the Hegewisch neighborhood on the Southeast side of Chicago. A live broadcast from Club 505 from 1959 can be heard on YouTube.

Eastern-style polka is similar to Chicago style but is played at a faster tempo, usually includes a bigger section of horns and reeds, and is connected to big-band era music rather than rock-and-roll. The most popular Eastern-style performer (and probably the most popular polka artist in America today) is Jimmy Sturr, winner of 15 Grammy Awards in the polka category. Other important Eastern-style performers include Frank Wojnarowski, Bernie Witkowski, Walt Solek, Larry Chesky, Ray Henry, and the Connecticut Twins.

==== Slovenian-American ====
The Slovenian style or Cleveland style is generally played at a smoother tempo and features different instrumentation. Whereas the Polish style utilizes trumpets and concertinas, the main melody instruments in the Slovenian band are the accordion and tenor saxophone. A diatonic accordion or "button box" is sometimes used instead of the piano accordion or chromatic accordion and offers a different sound. The Slovenian style also adds a banjo or guitar to bolster the rhythm section (most commonly banjo for polkas and guitar for waltzes). The epicenter of the Slovenian-American style of polka is undoubtedly Cleveland and northeast Ohio, but it is also popular in Pennsylvania and in many other cities in the Great Lakes region. The most influential figure in Slovenian-American polka is Frankie Yankovic, who helped "Americanize" the Slovenian polka and worked for years to popularize it, appearing throughout the country and even performing on The Tonight Show Starring Johnny Carson. He was crowned America's Polka King in Milwaukee in 1948. Slavko Avsenik was another important musician in the development the style, an accordion player from Slovenia who helped bridge the Slovenian and American polka worlds. Other important Slovenian-style pioneers include Johnny Pecon, Lou Trebar, Johnny Vadnal (along with brothers Tony, Frankie, and Richie), Kenny Bass, Louis Bashel and Eddie Habat. Roger Bright was a prominent accordion player from New Glarus, Wisconsin who fused Slovenian-style polka with Swiss melodic influences. The torchbearers of Slovenian-American or "Cleveland-Style" polka today include Jeff Pecon (Johnny's son), Joey Tomsick, Don Wojtila, Eddie Rodick, Eddie Klancnik, LynnMarie Hrovat and Alex Meixner. Like their Polish counterparts, these bands have also expanded their repertoire over the years to include a variety of styles of music including polkas, waltzes, American standards, Latin dances (cha chas, tangos, etc.), line dances, and rock 'n roll.

==== German-American ====
German-American bands sometimes resist being termed "polka bands" because they perform not only polkas but also waltzes, schottisches, laendlers, and various other ethnic forms of music. They prefer the term "old-time," but it is not to be confused with traditional American old-time music. Some of the modern day German-American bands have even been known to incorporate country & western and/or rock & roll into their repertoire. Their style is also sometimes known as "Dutchmen," a name derived from a band named The Six Fat Dutchmen (here 'Dutchmen' does not refer to Dutch people, but to German people, coming from the German word Deutsch). This is a contrast to Polish-American and Slovenian-American bands, which generally do not object to the term "polka band". German-American bands are also comparatively more traditional than the Slavic genres, with less modern American influence in their albums. Because of this, their recordings are much rarer and harder to come by than recordings of Slavic-style performers. The German-American sound is often described with the term "oom-pa-pa" and is characterized by an emphasis on brass (especially the tuba), accompanied by drums and reed instruments (including the accordion or concertina, although for the most part the Chemnitzer concertina is usually favored over the accordion in German-American bands). German-American style bands perform primarily in the Upper Midwest and in the so-called "polka belt" of North and South Dakota, Nebraska, Kansas, Oklahoma, and Texas. One important German-American performer is Lawrence Welk, who began his career as a band leader in South Dakota with an ethnic German-style ensemble called Welk's Novelty Orchestra. He later added more popular music to his band's repertoire, which enabled him to spread the polka throughout America by way of his famous television show. Other important modern German-American bands include the Hoolerie Dutchmen, the Jolly Swiss Boys, Happy Hans, and the Jerry Schneider Band.

==== Mexican-American ====
Mexican-American polkas are performed by ensembles called conjuntos, and are the predecessor of the norteño genre. The conjunto sound originated from the Czech and German influence on Mexican-Americans in Texas and northern Mexico. Conjunto bands play some polkas, but their most popular musical form is the ranchera, a form similar to polka. The instrumentation involves a combination of accordion, bajo sexto (a Mexican twelve-string guitar), bass, and drums. Important modern performers in the genre include Los Hermanos Bernal, Santiago Jimenez, Flaco Jimenez, Esteban Jordan, Valerio Longoria, and Tony De La Rosa among many others.

==== Papago-Pima ====
Papago-Pima style is more commonly referred to as "chicken scratch" and is associated with the Native American Tohono O'odham tribe (who were once the Papago). This tribe was influenced by the music of the Germans who settled in southern Arizona, the most popular area for this genre. Papago-Pima performers use a saxophone, accordion, guitar, electric bass, and drums in their performances, and commonly perform music that follows the form of the schottische (a dance with similar cultural origins as polka). The most important modern performers in this genre are Southern Scratch, the Joaquin Brothers, Papago Raiders, the Molinas, and T.O. Brave.

=== Other styles ===
While Keil's six genres cover the majority of traditional polka performers, other bands mix them and combine them with influences from other types of music. Brave Combo is one important modern group that plays a combination of these three genres, as well as mixing them with rock, Latin music, and other types of folk music. Started in 1979 by Carl Finch, the band has been awarded two Grammy Awards for Best Polka Album (for their 1999 album Polkasonic and their 2004 album Let's Kiss: 25th Anniversary Album) and has been nominated for five others. Other polka bands that transcend traditional style divisions and play polka music in modern way are the Alex Meixner Band, the Chardon Polka Band, and Captain Tom & The Hooligans.

Musicologist James P Leary, in his 2006 book Polkabilly: How the Goose Island Ramblers Redefined American Folk Music, said that the Goose Island Ramblers from Madison, Wisconsin epitemized a common type of creolized folk music in the Upper Midwest, a music that he termed 'polkabilly.' Their music blended traditional polka and continental European sounds with American old-time and country music, as well as humorous novelty songs and stage shows. Leary says that it was too American and modern to be called traditional polka, and too 'ethnic' and continental-European to be called folk or country music, and thus he coined the term 'polkabilly' for bands like them.

The Dreadnoughts, Polkacide, and Russkaja are three bands that are notable for fusing polka with punk rock, creating the "polka-punk" subgenre (sometimes considered a type of folk-punk). Despite the perceived differences between the two genres, the Dreadnoughts write that the two complement each other perfectly because polka "is the only genre that can cut through the fog of isolation and the ever-increasing social anxiety brought on by the slow takeover of our lives" by tech and media companies. They write that polka music has a strong cross-generational connectivity, and is able to "counteract the relentless negativity and irony that saturates popular culture." The Dreadnoughts used to perform as a traditional polka band called 'Polka Time!' in Vancouver before the COVID-19 pandemic, and continue to perform punk rock polkas at all of their shows (even having released an album titled Polka's Not Dead in 2010).

== Polka organizations ==
From tiny ethnic dance halls to larger-scale national organizations, there is a huge network of people working to keep the polka alive. One web site lists a total of 49 formal polka clubs nationwide, and there are many other smaller organizations . The largest organizations today include the International Polka Association (IPA), the United States Polka Association, the Polka Lovers Klub of America (Po.L.K. of A.), the National Cleveland-Style Polka Hall of Fame, the Penn-Ohio Polka Pals, and the Wisconsin Polka Boosters. Modern communication has also allowed polka fans to organize through national newsletters such as the Polish-American Journal, and the Post Eagle. Radio stations have been organized to perpetuate the popularity of the polka (although nowadays, most polka shows have been limited to airing on independent and time-brokered AM stations, small-market college FM stations, and a handful of Internet-only polka stations). One survey conducted in 1989 counted a total of 354 stations that played polka music in 32 states (although by September 2012, that number had dropped to 221 stations in 27 states). In 1985 the National Academy of Recording Arts and Sciences began awarding a Grammy Award for Best Polka Album, a category which ran until 2009.

=== The International Polka Association ===
The longest-standing polka organization is the Chicago-based International Polka Association (IPA). Beginning as an "International Polka Convention" in the mid-1960s, the IPA was officially established in 1968 with Leon Kozicki as the "organization builder" and John Hyzny as the "entrepreneur". According to its charter, its goals are "to promote, maintain, and advance public interest in polka entertainment". Today, the IPA still carries out yearly conventions every summer to allow polka fans to gather and to present the annual Polka Music Awards. The IPA established its Polka Music Hall of Fame in 1968 to honor worthy performers. In 1982, a museum was established, now located above Polonia Banquets, a century-old dance hall at 4608 S. Archer Ave. in the Brighton Park neighborhood, and open by appointment.

== Polka festivals ==
Throughout the United States, polka fans gather to participate in polka festivals. Many of these festivals are arranged by organizations such as the IPA and the United States Polka Association. Others, such as Polish-style performer Eddie Blazoncyzk's "Polka Fireworks" festival in Pittsburgh, are run by polka musicians or polka fans.

These festivals usually last several days and involve performances, dancing, jam sessions, beer, ethnic and local foods, athletic events, parades, and polka masses. Though many festival attendees belong to an older generation, there are also a substantial number of young participants. Polka music and polka festivals are often described as "happy" and "joyful" by their organizers and participants. In their book Polka Happiness, Charles and Angeliki Keil describe the aspects of these "polka parties" that allow them to bring joy to people of all ages. A wide variety of people are accepted and people are encouraged to dance with many different partners. The musicians dance as well as perform, and the live bands perform a variety of more modern music as well as traditional polkas and waltzes.

The Nebraska Czechs of Wilber (P.O. Box 652 Wilber, Nebraska 68465) have sponsored the annual Wilber Czech Days Festival since 1962. The Czech Festival, always held the first full weekend in August, includes music, dancing, museum, costumes, refreshments, a pageant and large parades on Saturday and Sunday of the festival. The Nebraska Czechs of Wilber organization was formed in 1962 to perpetuate the Czech heritage and culture, develop tourism and to boost the economy of Wilber. On July 17, 1963, Wilber was proclaimed ‘Czech Capital of Nebraska.’ On July 10, 1987, Wilber was proclaimed, ‘Czech Capital of the U.S.’

Other polka festivals include the United States Polka Association Convention, The Annual Minnesota State Polka Festival, Milwaukee Polish Fest, International Polka Association Convention, Pulaski Polka Days, New Glarus Polkafest, Wisconsin Dells Polish Fest, Frankenmuth Summer Music Fest, Oregon's Alpenfest Swiss-Bavarian festival, Polkamotion by the Ocean, Houghton Lake Polka Festival, SloveneFest, the Slovenian Sausage Festival, the Super Button Box Bash, Dyngus Day Cleveland, and the Thanksgiving Polka Weekend hosted by the National Cleveland-Style Polka Hall of Fame.

== Polka masses ==
Beginning in the early 1970s, the phenomenon of 'polka masses' began appearing. Polka masses are usually held by members of the Roman Catholic Church who consider the polka an important part of their ethnic heritages. The first polka mass was created by Father George Balasko in 1972 and the idea was spread by Father Frank Perkovich throughout the '70s and '80s. Both were polka musicians. In composing a polka mass, a musician either alters the lyrics of polka pieces to become more appropriate for a spiritual setting or creates an entirely new piece of polka-style music to sing with the usual sacred text. Robert Walser argues that the exuberant polka music motivates participants to "worship more vigorously." He also asserts that the polka mass "brings the community into the church" because it involves music and lyrics that the congregations are more familiar with.

== Polka music as an expression of culture ==
Polka music is obviously associated with various ethnic groups throughout America. This is evident in the division of the polka genres into specific ethnic styles. Dr. Ann Hetzel Gunkel describes the polka as a means of protecting ethnic heritage from the invasion of "American mass culture." She even argues that polka music can be perceived as a "radical alternative" to "mainstream culture". A good example of this is the polka mass. It allows entire communities to choose an alternate approach to worship that helps them preserve their ethnic origins. Another example of a resistance to mass culture is the status of polka stars. Popular polka performers are not viewed as sex symbols or idolized in the same way that pop stars of today are idolized. Instead, the performers work to establish a feeling of community by interacting and dancing with their audience. This expression of ethnicity is especially important as America continues to homogenize through media and the culture of capitalism. Sheltered communities that were once saturated with traditional culture are forced to join mainstream 'American culture'. Keeping the polka alive allows these communities to establish a tangible aspect of their culture that can be maintained amidst the changes American society faces.

The Dreadnoughts, a modern advocate for polka music, write that polka music is important and vital for modern audiences because it "can cut through the fog of isolation and the ever-increasing social anxiety" of the modern age, and that polka music "is the only genre cheerful enough to reach all generations and to counteract the relentless negativity and irony that saturates popular culture."

Charles Keil describes the paradox that "polka is a modern urban style that enables traditional cultures to persist". Polka enthusiasts have to mediate between the desire to preserve their culture and the desire to keep the polka alive through future generations. This involves establishing a balance between traditionalism and modernism, and one example of this conflict is the language polka music is performed in. Performers have to face the decision of performing and recording music in their original languages to appease those who prefer a more traditional approach, and performing and recording in English to attract a wider, younger audience. English has become more and more popular, but many performers still perform songs with German, Polish, or Czech lyrics. Another example of performer response to this conflict is the practice of performing and recording covers of popular non-polka music, along with traditional polka music. The problem of attracting a broader audience while still preserving cultural heritage is an ongoing challenge in the polka world. The demographic for polka music in the USA currently consists primarily of married men and women between the ages of 60–85 with a median age of 74.

== See also ==
- Music of immigrant communities in the United States
- List of Weird Al Yankovic polka medleys
