= List of polka artists =

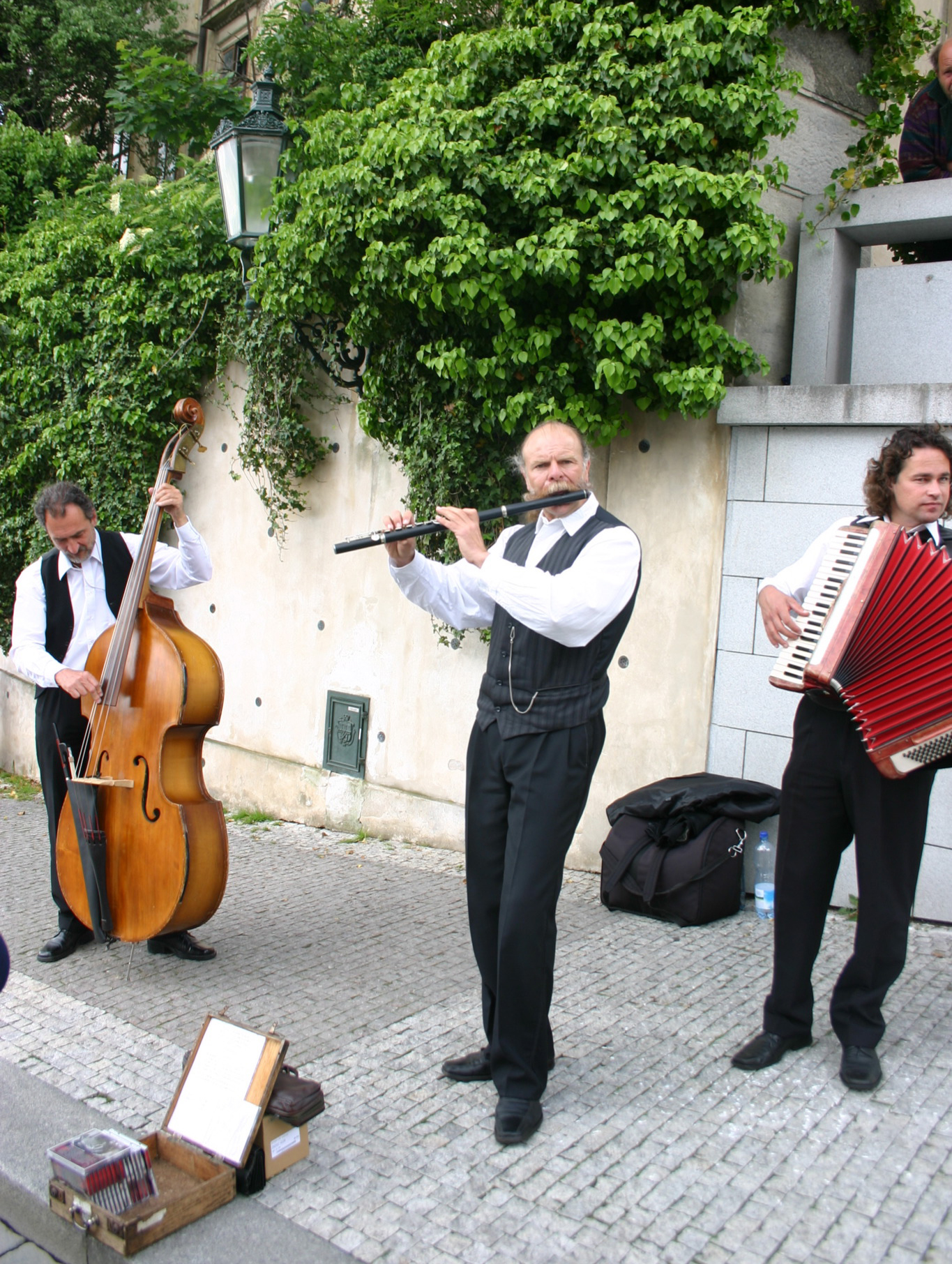
A street Polka band in Prague, Czech Republic.

This is a list of polka artists. It includes notable musicians and musical groups that play polka.

== Notable artists ==
- Slavko Avsenik
- Eddie Blazonczyk, The Versatones
- Brave Combo, Texas, alternative, two-time Grammy Award winner
- Tom Brusky, Wisconsin
- The Chardon Polka Band, Ohio
- Walter Dana, polka promoter and founder of Dana Records
- Eläkeläiset
- Myron Floren
- Global Kryner, Austrian band/pop/jazz/polka
- Romy Gosz
- Walt Groller
- Happy Louie and Julcia's Polka Band
- Walter Jagiello - Li'l Wally
- The Knewz
- Harold Loeffelmacher, Dutchman/Oompah
- Loituma
- Crusade
- Walter Ostanek, Canada, three-time Grammy Award winner, Slovenian-Canadian
- Polka Floyd
- Polkacide, San Francisco punk-polka band
- The Mike Schneider Polka Band, Slovenian-style polka band from Milwaukee, WI
- Six Fat Dutchmen
- Walt Solek, the "Clown Prince of Polka"
- Jimmy Sturr, United States, eighteen Grammy Awards
- Those Darn Accordions
- Lawrence Welk, South Dakota
- Whoopee John Wilfahrt
- "Weird Al" Yankovic (Every studio album except his self-titled debut and "Even Worse" has a polka medley on it of popular music)
- Frankie Yankovic, Slovenian-American
- The Dreadnoughts

== See also ==
- Grammy Award for Best Polka Album
- Polka Hall of Fame
