= List of accordionists =

Alphabetized list of notable accordionists

This is an alphabetized list of notable accordionists who have their own main articles or belong to a notable band.

== A ==
- Benny Andersson (born 1946) – Swedish songwriter, member of best-selling pop group ABBA
- Lydie Auvray (born 1956) – French/German accordionist, composer
- Slavko Avsenik (1929–2015) – Slovenian songwriter, the founder of Ansambel bratov Avsenik
- Ramon Ayala (born 1928) – American accordionist
- Ramon Ayala (born 1945) – Mexican accordionist, composer
- Nick Ariondo (born 1949) – American accordionist, composer

== B ==
- Quim Barreiros (born 1947) – Portuguese accordionist and Pimba songwriter
- Louie Bashell (1914–2008) – American polka musician
- Alan Bern (born 1955) – member of the Klezmer band Brave Old World
- Bratko Bibič (born 1957) – Slovene accordionist
- Ronald Binge (1910–1979) – British accordionist and member of the Mantovani Orchestra
- Renato Borghetti (born 1963) – Brazilian musician
- Franko Božac (born 1974) – Croatian classical and concert accordionist
- Roger Bright (1937–2001) – American polka musician
- Jeffery Broussard (born 1967) – American zydeco musician
- Smiley Burnette (1911–1967) – American accordionist

== C ==
- Carl Jularbo (1893-1966) - Swedish accordionist and composer
- Manuela Josefa Cabrera (born 1943) – Dominican merengue accordionist
- Willi Carlisle (born 1989) – American folk and country musician
- Carmen Carrozza (1921–2013) – classical and concert accordionist
- Nico Carstens (1926–2016) – South African accordionist and songwriter, composer of the hit song "Zambezi"
- Boozoo Chavis (1930–2001) – American zydeco musician
- Clifton Chenier (1925–1987) – American zydeco musician
- Larry Chesky (1933–2011) – American polka musician
- Dick Contino (1930–2017) – appeared on The Ed Sullivan Show a record 48 times
- Gianni Coscia (born 1931) – jazz accordionist
- Charles Thomas Cozens (born 1952) – Canadian classical and classical crossover accordionist
- James Crabb (born 1967) – Scottish classical accordion player
- Egidio Cuadrado (1953–2024) – Colombian Vallenato accordionist
- Phil Cunningham (born 1960) – Scottish folk accordionist
- Andy Cutting (born 1969) – English folk accordionist

== D ==
- Jackie Daly (born 1945) – Irish traditional musician
- Robert Davine (1924–2001) – Professor of Accordion & Music Theory – University of Denver: Lamont School of Music
- Pietro Deiro (1888–1954) – pioneer of the accordion
- Geno Delafose (born 1971) – American zydeco musician
- John Delafose (1939–1994) – American zydeco musician
- Vladimir Denissenkov (born 1956) – Russian Bayan
- Dennis DeYoung (born 1947) – American member of Styx, played on "Boat on the River"
- Orlando DiGirolamo (1924–1998), American
- Wolfgang Dimetrik (born 1974), Austrian
- Henry Doktorski (born 1956) – American classical and concert accordionist
- Dominguinhos (1941–2013) – Brazilian music
- Wilf Doyle (1925–2012) – traditional musician from Newfoundland
- Stanley Dural Jr. (Buckwheat Zydeco) (1947–2016) – American zydeco musician
- Alejo Durán (1919–1989) – Colombian Vallenato accordionist, singer, composer
- Finbarr Dwyer (1946–2014) – Irish traditional musician

== E ==
- Mogens Ellegaard (1935–1995) – father of the avant-garde accordion movement
- Jack Emblow (born 1930) – with Cliff Adams Singers
- Keith Emerson (1944–2016)
- John Evan (born 1948) – of Jethro Tull

== F ==
- Joe Falcon (1900–1965) – Cajun accordion player who recorded with his wife Cléoma Breaux, mainly in French
- Jeff Fatt (born 1953) – member of The Wiggles
- James Fearnley (born 1954) – member of The Pogues
- Carl Finch (born 1951) – accordionist with the American polka fusion band Brave Combo
- Myron Floren (1919–2005)
- Connie Francis (1937-2025)
- Preston Frank (born 1947) – American zydeco musician
- Keith Frank (born 1972) – American zydeco musician
- Dominic Frontiere (1931–2017)
- Pietro Frosini (1885–1951)

== G ==
- Benny Gallagher (born 1945) – Scottish singer-songwriter; member of Gallagher and Lyle, McGuinness Flint and Ronnie Lane's Slim Chance
- Anthony Galla-Rini (1904–2006) – American accordionist, arranger, composer, conductor, author and teacher
- Richard Galliano (born 1950) – French jazz accordionist
- Krency Garcia – Dominican merengue tipico accordionist, better known as El Prodigio
- Régis Gizavo (1959–2017) – accordionist from Madagascar
- Luiz Gonzaga (1912–1989) – the King of Baião
- Martin Green (born 1980) – English composer and accordionist, member of the folk trio Lau
- Josh Groban (born 1981) – learned the accordion to play the role of Pierre Bezukhov in the musical Natasha, Pierre & The Great Comet of 1812
- Michael Guerra (born 1981) – member of The Mavericks
- Alfredo Gutiérrez (born 1943) – Colombian Vallenato musician

== H ==
- Joe Hall (1971-2024) – American la la and Cajun musician
- Frode Haltli (born 1975) – Norwegian accordionist
- Daniel Handler (born 1970), aka Lemony Snicket
- Rolf Harris (1930–2023)
- Kevin Hearn (born 1969) – zydeco musician of Barenaked Ladies
- Tatico Henríquez (1943–1976) – Dominican Merengue típico accordionist
- Matt Hensley – of Flogging Molly
- Harry Hibbs (1942–1989) – Canadian musician
- David Hidalgo (born 1954) – member of Los Lobos
- Lars Hollmer (1948–2008) – Swedish accordionist
- Bruce Hornsby (born 1954)
- Nihad Hrustanbegovic (born 1973)
- Garth Hudson (born 1937) – member of The Band
- Rob Hyman (born 1950) – member of The Hooters

== I ==
- Gary Innes (born 1980) – member of Scottish group Mànran

== J ==
- Walter "Li'l Wally" Jagiello (1930–2006) – Polish-American polka musician
- Bengan Janson (born 1963) – Swedish jazz- and folk music player
- Ryan Jarman (born 1980) – member of The Cribs
- Jean-Michel Jarre (born 1948)
- Flaco Jiménez (born 1939)
- Santiago Jiménez Jr. (born 1944)
- Beau Jocque (1953–1999) – zydeco musician
- Billy Joel (born 1949)
- Pete Jolly (1932–2004) – American jazz pianist and accordionist
- Brian Jones (1942–1969) – member of The Rolling Stones
- Steve Jordan (1939–2010)
- Tyler Joseph (born 1988) – lead singer of Twenty One Pilots
- Kepa Junkera (born 1965) – Basque musician and composer

== K ==
- Boris Karlov (1924–1964) – Bulgarian accordionist, born in Sofia into a Romani family.
- James Keane (born 1948) – Irish traditional musician
- Jimmy Keane (born 1958) – English musician
- John Kirkpatrick (born 1947)
- Guy Klucevsek (1947-2025) – American musician and composer
- Yasuhiro Kobayashi (born 1959)
- Jonas Kocher (born 1977)
- Julian Koster (born 1972) – Neutral Milk Hotel

== L ==
- Gabby La La (born 1979)
- Andrés Landero (1932–2000) – cumbia accordionist, singer, composer
- Isidro Larrañaga (died 2022)
- Lead Belly (1889–1949) – American folk and blues musician
- Don Lee (1930–2015) – musician who had the 1957 hit "ECHO, Echo echo"
- Yuri Lemeshev (born 1954) – member of Gogol Bordello
- John Linnell (born 1959) – member of They Might Be Giants
- Nils Lofgren (born 1951)
- Radoslav Lorković (born 1958) – Croatian pianist and accordionist
- Todd Lumley (born 1968)

== M ==
- Charles Magnante (1905–1986) – pioneer of the accordion
- Frank Marocco (1931–2012) – jazz accordionist
- Mat Mathews (1924–2009) – Dutch jazz accordionist
- Bear McCreary (born 1979) – American film composer
- Loreena McKennitt (born 1957) – Canadian musician, composer, harpist, accordionist and pianist
- Johnny Meijer (1912–1992) – Dutch jazz accordionist
- Dionisio Mejia (1911–1978) – Dominican merengue tipico accordionist, better known as Guandulito
- Verne Meisner (1938–2005) – American polka musician
- Colacho Mendoza (1936–2003) – Colombian Vallenato accordionist
- Lisandro Meza (1937–2023) – Colombian musician
- Andrew Micallef (born 1969) – Maltese chromatic button accordionist
- Alessandra Mignacca (born c.1977/78) – Italian accordion player, teacher
- Joey Miskulin (born 1949) American accordionist, also member of western music and comedy group Riders in the Sky
- Brian Mitchell – member of Fatboy Kanootch, Levon Helm Band
- Aniceto Molina (1939–2015) – Colombian musician

== N ==
- Maria Ney (1890–1959/61) – German cabaret performer
- Franz Nicolay (born 1977) – member of The World/Inferno Friendship Society
- Krist Novoselic (born 1965) – bassist in Nirvana

== O ==
- Pauline Oliveros (1932–2016) – avant garde performer and composer
- Walter Ostanek (born 1935)
- Vladimir Oidupaa (1949-2013)

== P ==
- Nejc Pačnik (born 1990) – Slovenian accordionist, twice accordion world-champion and accordion teacher
- Esa Pakarinen (1911–1989) – Finnish accordionist and actor
- Willard A. "Bill" Palmer (1917–1996) – inventor of the quint system which was later patented by Titano as used in their line of "converter" (or "quint") bass accordions
- Zeena Parkins (born 1956) – American accordionist
- Van Dyke Parks (born 1943) – composer, arranger, and accordionist
- Don Peachey (born 1933) – American musician and recording artist
- Cory Pesaturo (born 1986) – eclectic accordionist
- Joseph Petric (born 1952) – Canadian concert accordionist
- Celso Piña (1953–2019) – cumbia musician
- Kimmo Pohjonen (born 1964) – experimental Finnish accordionist

== R ==
- Matti Rantanen (born 1952) – classical accordionist
- Juancho Rois (1958–1994) – Colombian Vallenato musician
- Israel Romero (born 1955) – Colombian Vallenato musician
- Saul Rose (born 1973) – English melodeon player
- Roberto Ruscitti (born 1941) – Venezuelan accordionist

== S ==
- Johnny Sansone (born 1957)
- William Schimmel (born 1946) – accordionist, composer and philosopher
- John Serry Sr. (1915–2003) – classical and concert accordionist, free-bass accordionist
- Alexander Sevastian (1976–2018) – Russian-Canadian classical, concert, and classical crossover accordionist
- Jimmy Shand (1908–2000) – Scottish accordionist, made famous by his unique Scottish Country Dance Band and popularity for dances.
- Sharon Shannon (born 1968) – Irish accordionist
- Sivuca (1930–2006) – Brazilian musician
- Chango Spasiuk (born 1968) – Argentine folk musician of Ukrainian descent
- John Spiers (born 1975) – English melodeon player
- Will Starr (1922–1976) – Scottish accordionist, technically a genius and a true master of the button key accordion, famous for his expertise at playing every genre of music. Described as the true "Master of the Button Key Accordion"

== T ==
- Natalia Tena (born 1984)
- Judy Tenuta comedienne (born 1949)
- Matt Thiessen (born 1980) – member of Relient K
- Yann Tiersen (born 1970) – French composer and multi-instrumentalist
- Lee Tomboulian (born 1960)
- Arthur Tracy (1899–1997) – American accordionist and ballad singer
- Viola Turpeinen (1909–1958) – Finnish-American polka musician
- Karen Tweed (born 1963) – English and Scandinavian accordionist

== U ==
- Brendon Urie (born 1987) – member of Panic! at the Disco

== V ==
- Kristín Anna Valtýsdóttir (born 1982)
- Art Van Damme (1920–2010)
- Tim Van Eyken (born 1978)
- Mika Väyrynen (born 1967)
- Eddie Vedder (born 1964) – member of Pearl Jam
- Aníbal Velásquez (born 1936) – Colombian Vallenato musician
- Julieta Venegas (born 1970)
- Travis Vengroff (born 1987) – member of Random Encounter
- Emir Vildić (born 1984) – Bosnian accordionist and accordion teacher
- Gus Viseur (1915–1974) – French accordionist

== W ==
- Cedric Watson (born 1983) – American Creole musician
- Jason Webley (born 1974) – American musician
- Lawrence Welk (1903–1992)
- Martin White – British cover artist
- Minnie White (1916–2001) – Newfoundland's "First Lady of the Accordion"
- Wix Wickens (born 1956)
- Bill Wilkie (1922–2017)
- Gwenda Wilkin (1933–2020)
- Dave Willey (born 1963)
- Patrick Wolf (born 1983)
- Richard Wright (1943–2008) – member of Pink Floyd

== Y ==
- Frankie Yankovic (1915–1998) – polka musician
- "Weird Al" Yankovic (born 1959) – song parodist, comedian
- Max Yankowitz (1875–1945) – klezmer musician

== Z ==
- Jimmy Zambrano (born 1966) – Colombian Vallenato accordionist
- Joe Zawinul (1932–2007)
- Vladislav Zolotaryov (1942–1975)
- Emiliano Zuleta (1912–2005) – Colombian Vallenato accordionist, composer

== See also ==
- List of banjo players
- List of cellists
- List of didgeridoo players
- List of euphonium players
- List of flautists
- List of guitarists
- List of harmonicists
