= Romy Gosz =

American polka musician (1910–1966)

- Born: Roman Louis Gosz; August 2, 1910; Grimms, Wisconsin, U.S.
- Died: August 29, 1966 (aged 56) Manitowoc, Wisconsin, U.S.
- Genres: Bohemian-style polka
- Instruments: Piano, Trumpet

Roman 'Romy' Louis Gosz (August 2, 1910 Grimms, Wisconsin - August 29, 1966, Manitowoc, Wisconsin) was a popular and commercially successful polka musician in the upper Midwest. Gosz's music featured the Bohemian brass style and appealed to the many ethnic groups (Dutch, Bohemian, Belgian, German and Polish) found throughout the region.

== History ==
Romy Gosz was born on August 2, 1910, in Grimms, Wisconsin, to Paul and Anna Gosz, the fourth of their seven children.

At age 7, Gosz would take his first and only piano lesson. When he told his piano teacher he would not be able to make his next lesson because he had a dance job, he was told "not to come back at all if you can play a job with one lesson".

When he was 11, Gosz joined his father Paul and his older brother's, George and Mike, in forming the Paul Gosz Orchestra. Their first job was playing at a silver wedding anniversary in Newton, Wisconsin. The very next night, they played a golden anniversary at the J.D. Prokash hall in Rockwood, Wisconsin, and the night after that, the group played a sixtieth wedding anniversary dance.

A few years later, Gosz's father Paul decided to work more at his day job at the local lime kiln, Allwood Lime Company, and he handed the management of the family orchestra over to George. By 1928, leadership of the group had passed to Romy, who was barely eighteen at the time. Still a minor, Gosz was unable to conduct business and manage the band legally, so he retained his father's name for the group. Early on, Gosz determined that his group should focus on the making of records and live performances. He thought that playing over the radio on a regular basis would be detrimental to the band's traveling and the resulting opportunity to interact with their audiences.

On July 5, 1929, Gosz married Antoinette Leggio at St. Anne Catholic Church in Francis Creek, Wisconsin, the same parish where he had attended school as a boy. The couple took up residence in a small home that Gosz and his father built in Rockwood. Over the next seven years, the couple would have five children (four sons and one daughter). In 1948, Gosz purchased a home with an adjacent Tavern and Dance Hall at "Polifka's Corners" (the intersection of Manitowoc County Road T and Polifka Road) near Kellnersville.

Gosz and his orchestra cut their first record in 1930 at the Broadway studio in Grafton, Wisconsin. They recorded an old Bohemian tune called "Pilsen Polka" on YouTube. Gosz commented that they did it "just to see what the band sounded like." The recording of "Pilsen Polka" became a bestseller throughout the decade and was key to building Gosz's popularity.

Later that same year, the band donated its services for the diamond jubilee celebration of St. Mary's Catholic church in Tisch Mills, Wisconsin. When the pastor, Father Rudolph James Hodik, went to Rome the following year for an audience with Pope Pius XI, he presented the pontiff with some of Gosz's recordings. Father Hodik returned home with a papal blessing for Gosz and the band. The papal blessing and a picture of Pope Pius were some of Gosz's proudest possessions and were displayed prominently in the Gosz home.

In 1931 Gosz found himself without a trumpet player. Gosz commented, "I knew where I could get a good pianist, but couldn't find a trumpet player, so I changed from piano to trumpet. I taught myself. In six months we made a recording with me double tonguing on the trumpet."

The Wisconsin American Legion was searching for a musical theme for its 1934 convention, when somebody heard Gosz's "The Prune Song". It was immediately adopted as the convention theme. Originally an old Bohemian waltz called "Sveskova Alej", Gosz increased the song's tempo and added some double tonguing to the trumpet part. This is typical of many of his recordings. Today, the song is known as "We Left Our Wives Back Home"

His recordings "Musical Clock" and "Picnic In The Woods" appeared in early country music charts printed by Billboard Magazine.

By 1940, Gosz's band was very popular with the general Wisconsin audiences. It was around this time that a Sheboygan, Wisconsin, radio station polled listeners for their favorite bandleader. In the one-week poll Gosz placed first, with a margin of seven hundred votes over the second-place finisher, western bandleader, Gene Autry.

The national press soon took note of Gosz's popularity, with articles appearing in Billboard, Coronet, Life, Pic, and Time.

On June 9, 1948, Gosz took part in a battle of the bands at the Milwaukee Arena. Competing against Louis Bashell, Lawrence Duchow, Harold Loeffelmacher and the Six Fat Dutchmen, Whoopee John Wilfahrt, and Frankie Yankovic. At the event's conclusion, the title of "America's Polka King" was awarded to Yankovic.

At their peak, Gosz and his bands were on the road six nights a week, returning home for a noon radio show on Sunday and then playing a park concert, picnic, or festival in the afternoon. The band would perform from 8:00 pm to 1:00 am, at a pace of up to fourteen songs per hour. At the end of the night, Gosz often played up to five encores. When asked about his schedule, Gosz said, "We're a tough bunch around here. We have to be. We recently played 52 consecutive nights and not one of my men missed a day on his regular job." Gosz spent the majority of his travels in Wisconsin, playing a circuit of towns that included: Batavia, Bonduel, Denmark, Embarrass, Freedom, Jericho, Kimberly, Krok, Luxemburg, Poland, Pulaski, Royalton, Scandinavia, Slovan, Sobieski, Sugar Bush, Symco, Waterloo, and Zachow. Less frequently, Gosz played in Michigan, Minnesota, Nebraska and the Dakotas. Gosz handled all of his own bookings, and not being the most attentive businessman, he often double-booked his gigs. Whenever this happened, Gosz would hire a pickup band and play one engagement, and he would send his orchestra to work the other.

== Death ==
In the latter half of August 1966, Gosz was admitted to Manitowoc Memorial Hospital to undergo gallbladder surgery. During the operation, surgeons determined that they could not complete the surgery because the gall bladder was too badly infected. This resulted in further complications, including the onset of pneumonia. All of this transpired during the week of the Manitowoc County Fair. Gosz's following was so great, it is reported that when his death was announced on August 29 to the fairgoers, the grounds were absolutely silent. The day of his funeral, over twenty-three hundred people filed by his coffin, paying their respects. Sometime after, a fan commented that, "When he lived, the dance floor was filled with happy people. When he died - standing room only. The church was full." Romy Gosz was buried in the church cemetery of the St. Anne Catholic Church in Francis Creek, Wisconsin.

== Recognition ==
Inducted into the International Polka Hall of Fame by the International Polka Association in 1979.

Inducted into the Wisconsin Polka Hall of Fame in 1998 with a Life Achievement Award.

== Recording catalog ==
Romy recorded over 180 tunes during his lifetime for a variety of labels, including Broadway, Brunswick, Columbia, Coral, Decca, King, Mercury, Mono, Okeh, Polkaland, Universal and Vocalion.

=== Band names ===
Throughout Romy's career, there were quite a few variations in the name of the band.

- Paul Gosz's Orchestra - Broadway, 1931
- Paulie's Play Boys - Broadway, 1931
- Roman Gosz and His Bohemian Orchestra - Columbia, 1934
- Roman Gosz and His Band - Coral & Decca, 1938–39
- Roman Gosz and His Old Time Band - Coral & Decca, 1938–39
- Roman Gosz and His Orchestra - Okeh & Vocalion, 1934
- Romy Gosz and His Band - Coral & Decca, 1938–39; Mercury & Universal, 1940's; Mono, 1961
- Romy Gosz and His Orchestra - Mercury & Universal, 1940's
- Romy Gosz, His Trumpet, and His Orchestra - Polkaland, 1950's

=== Song list ===
A

- A Night in the Spring Waltz
- Adrian Polka
- After the Morning Waltz
- After We Married Waltz
- Alone in the World Waltz
- Amelia Polka
- American Girl Polka
- Antoinette Polka
- Anvil Waltz
- Arise My Darling Polka
- At Home Waltz
- At the Mill Polka
- At the Spring Waltz
- Autumn Rose Laendler

B

- Barbara Polka on YouTube
- Barnswallow Polka
- Bay City Polka
- Beautiful Blanche Polka
- Beautiful Evening Waltz
- Belle of The Night Polka, The
- Behind the Blacksmith Shop Waltz
- Blackbird Waltz
- Blue Eyes Waltz
- Bridal March, The on YouTube
- Broadway Polka
- Broke But Happy Polka
- Broken Heart Polka
- By the Lake Waltz

C

- Celski Waltz
- Cesky Laendler
- Charming Katie Polka
- Cherry Pickers Polka
- Circling Pigeons Waltz
- Clarinet Polka
- Clarinet Waltz
- Clover by the Water Polka
- Cloverleaf Polka
- Coffee Party Polka
- Costellos Waltz
- Cottage Under the Mountain Waltz
- County Girl Polka
- Crackerjack Polka

D

- Dakota Waltz on YouTube
- Dancing at the Midway Schottische
- Dandy Polka
- Decca Joe Polka
- Don't Give Up Polka
- Don't Give Up Polka Ver 2
- Dove Polka
- Dove Waltz

E

- Echos of Spring Waltz
- Ellen Polka
- Elsa Polka
- Elsie Polka
- Elvira Polka
- Enchanted Woods Waltz
- Evening Breezes Waltz
- Evening on the Lehigh Waltz

F

- Fairy Tale Waltz on YouTube
- Fall Time Waltz
- Falling Apples Laendler
- Farewell Polka
- Favorite Waltz, The
- Filemena Polka
- Fireman's March
- First Love Waltz
- Forsaken Memories Waltz
- Founding Waltz
- Four Leaf Clover Polka

G

- Gaytime Polka
- George & Joe Polka
- Gladiola Waltz
- Go To Sleep My Children Waltz
- Golden Polka
- Good Luck Polka
- Grandfather's Joy Laendler
- Grandmother's Joy Laendler
- Grasshopper Polka
- Green Meadow Waltz

H

- Happy Nights Waltz
- Harvest Time Schottische
- Have a Drink Polka
- Heartaches Waltz
- Herr Schmidt
- Hillside Waltz
- Holzauction Schottische
- Home Sweet Home
- Homecoming Waltz
- Hot Stuff Polka
- Huntsman Waltz

I

- In Good Humor Leandler
- In the Dark Polka
- In the Green Grove Polka
- Innocence Waltz
- It's Your Fault Polka

J, K

- Jo Jo Polka
- Johnny's Tune In Waltz
- Josie Polka
- Jumping Jimmy Polka
- Katinka A Kido Polka
- Kiss Polka

L

- Laendler #1
- Laendler #10
- Laendler #11
- Laendler #13
- Laendler #14
- Laendler #18
- Laendler #30
- Let's Be Happy Polka on YouTube
- Let's Get Together Waltz
- Libby's Waltz
- Linky's Laendler
- Lonely Lass Polka
- Loudmouth Polka
- Love Waltz on YouTube

M

- Madelinka Polka
- Madlenka Polka
- Mary Laendler on YouTube
- Matilda Polka
- Max's Polka
- Meadowbrook Waltz
- Merry Month of May Polka
- Morning Star Polka on YouTube
- Mountain Polka
- Musical Clock Polka
- Musicians Come Out and Play Polka
- Musicians Play All Night on YouTube
- Muziky Muziky Polka
- My Darling Waltz
- My Dreamboat Waltz

O

- Of Olden Days Laendler
- Oh! It was a Beautiful Dream Waltz
- Oh No Polka on YouTube
- Old Accordionist Waltz
- Old Bohemian Laendler
- Old Bohemian Waltz
- Old Lager Polka
- Old Time Laendler
- On Our Porch Polka
- On the Balcony Waltz
- Oneta Polka on YouTube
- Orphan Waltz
- Our Love Waltz

P

- Perlacher Laendler
- Picnic in the Woods Polka (Decca, 1938)
- Pilsen Polka on YouTube
- Polka for Two
- Poor Cinderella Polka on YouTube
- Prosit Laendler
- Prune Song, The (Columbia, 1933)

Q, R

- Quiet Evening Waltz Part 1
- Quiet Evening Waltz Part 2
- Rain Rain Polka
- Randy's Waltz
- Rano Ranicko Polka on YouTube
- Red Handkerchief Waltz, The (Okeh, 1935) on YouTube
- Rib Mountain Polka
- Rolinka Polka
- Rolling Stone Polka
- Romy's Favorite Polka on YouTube
- Romy's Laendler
- Romy's Theme Song

S

- Saturday Night Waltz
- Sometimes Only Polka
- Spanish Polka on YouTube
- Sugar Blues on YouTube
- Svestkova Alej Waltz on YouTube
- Sylvia Polka

T

- Tea Party Waltz
- Tell Me Sincerely Polka
- Tipsy Waltz
- Tom Cat Polka
- Tribus Polka
- Twenty Crowns Polka

U, V

- Under the Bridge Polka
- Unknown Girl Polka
- Vatslov Polka
- Village Barn Schottische
- Village Tavern Polka

W, X, Y, Z

- Waltzing in the Woods
- War Eagle March
- Wedding Bells Waltz
- When We Meet Polka
- When We Parted Waltz
- White Acacias Tango
- Who's Going to Love You Polka
- Zeleny Valcik

== Former band members ==
The members of the Gosz bands changed over time as well, with each of the following musicians accompanying Gosz on either a recording session or a live performance.

- Joe Chizek - Tuba
- Richard Fricke - drums
- Andy Heier - drums
- Gene Heier
- Melvin Heier
- Wencil (Jim) Jirikovec - clarinet
- Ludger Karmen
- Gordy Kohlbeck - piano, piano accordion
- Linky Kohlbeck - clarinet, sax
- Dave Kruswick - trumpet
- Don Kruswick - clarinet
- Douglas Morton Lueck - piano
- Rudy Plocar - trumpet, sax, clarinet
- Fritz Puls - tuba, bass
- Bill Maertz
- Paul Nedvecki
- Norman Skornicka - baritone sax, clarinet
- Joe Stuiber - drums
- Max Terens - bass horn
- Mickey Vetter
- Ray Wanek
- Emil Yindra - saxophone
- Dan Zahorik - piano, accordion
