= The Mike Schneider Polka Band =

American musical group

The Mike Schneider Polka Band performing at Tony Petkovsek's 2006 Thanksgiving Polka Weekend.

The Mike Schneider Polka Band from Milwaukee, Wisconsin is a Slovenian-style polka group that performs at approximately 100 events annually in Wisconsin and throughout the United States. Founded in 1996 by Mike Schneider, the band is a four-time award winner and 16-time nominee from such organizations as the National Cleveland Style Polka Hall of Fame, the Wisconsin Polka Boosters, the Wisconsin Polka Hall of Fame, the Wisconsin Polka Music Awards, and the Wisconsin Area Music Industry (WAMI).

The Mike Schneider Polka Band was the featured subject of the September 15, 2005-edition of the show Positively Milwaukee on WTMJ-TV for its work on the Wisconsin Polka, a benefit project for Children's Hospital of Wisconsin. It was also featured on "Food Nation with Bobby Flay" on the Food Network in 2002. Bandleader Schneider was the subject of the lead story "Kids Dig Polka" in the October 24, 1997 Milwaukee Journal Sentinel.

The Mike Schneider Polka Band was influenced musically by Frankie Yankovic and Verne Meisner.

== Awards and nominations ==
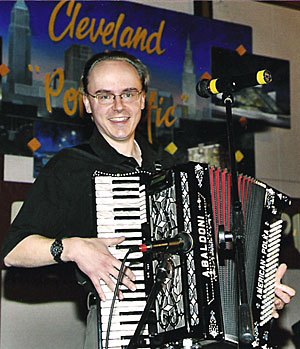
Mike Schneider, the band's leader

- Winner, Wisconsin Polka Hall Of Fame First Annual Young Band Of The Year (1997)
- Nominee, Wisconsin Polka Hall Of Fame Band Of The Year (1998, 1999, 2000, 2001, 2005, 2006, 2007, 2008)
- Nominee, National Cleveland Style Polka Hall Of Fame Best New/Young Band (1999, 2000)
- Nominee, Wisconsin Area Music Industry Best Polka Band Nominee (1999, 2000, 2001)
- Winner, Wisconsin Polka Boosters Distinguished Service Award Recipient (2006)
- Winner, Wisconsin Polka Music Exceptional Achievement Award (2007)
- Winner, Wisconsin Polka Music Recording of the Year Award (2007)
- Winner, Wisconsin Polka Hall Of Fame Band of the Year (2009)
- Winner, Wisconsin Polka Hall Of Fame Honor Roll Award (2011)
- Winner, Wisconsin Polka Hall Of Fame Youth Mentor Award (2015)
- Winner, Wisconsin Polka Hall Of Fame Support & Promotion Award (2015)
- Winner, National Cleveland Style Polka Hall Of Fame Best New Song (2017)

== Full-length recordings ==
- First Impressions (1995)
- Second Thoughts (1996)
- The Pursuit Of Polka’s Lost Frontier (1998)
- Polka Visions (2002)
- A Stretch of the Imagination (2004)
- The Mike Schneider Band Live! (2006)
- Accordion Artistry (2008)
- Pint Size Polkas: Volume One (2008)
- Pint Size Polkas: Volume Two, Dance! (2010)
- Live on the Mollie B Polka Party! (2013)
- Happy Polka Day (2017)
- The Original Collection (2018)

== Single Recordings ==
- Star Spangled Banner for WTMJ (AM) (2000)
- Happy Birthday Polka (2001)
- Bill Michaels Polka for WTMJ (AM) (2004)
- Polka Parade Theme Song for WJYI (2004)
- Sabrina's Songs (2005)
- The Wisconsin Polka (2005)

== Compilations Featuring The Mike Schneider Polka Band ==
- Polkasound Potpourri (1997)
- Parade Of Blue Chip Polkas, Volume 5 (1998)
- The Best of Polka Parade (2003, 2005, 2006)
