= Tom Brusky =

American musician

Tom Brusky performing at the International Polkafest in Chisolm, Minnesota, 2007

Tom Brusky (born 1969) is a Slovenian-style polka musician and bandleader from Milwaukee, Wisconsin who also produces and records music through his company, Polkasound Productions. Brusky has appeared on over sixty recordings worldwide along with artists such as Verne and Steve Meisner, Eric Noltkamper, Kathy Zamejc Vogt, Jeff Winard, and Frankie Yankovic. He performs roughly 150 events a year throughout Southeastern Wisconsin and abroad.

Tom Brusky was born into a musical family. Both his father, Jim, and his brother, Ron, played big-band, dixieland, and polka music professionally with bands such as Louis Bashell, Guy Lombardo, Chuck Hedges, Russ Morgan, Don Nedobeck, and Dick Rodgers. His mother, Jan, is an accomplished orchestral musician and pipe organist. His sister, Susan, is a Wisconsin Area Music Industry (WAMI)-winning drummer who toured the country with a heavy-metal band in the 1980s, opening for such acts as Wendy O. Williams.

Tom Brusky plays the accordion, drums, bass guitar, piano, and tuba.

== Wisconsin Polka Hall of Fame Awards ==
- "Sideman of the Year" 1998
- "Horizon Award" 2000
- "Sideman of the Year" 2006

== Tom Brusky discography ==
- 1989 "Song of Lecco"
- 1990 "Generations Together"
- 1992 "Don't Shoot the Accordion Player"
- 1995 "Undercover"
- 1997 "Polkalanis"
- 1997 "Tom x 5 But Not Quite Live"
- 1999 "Polkas from the Digital Domain"
- 2000 "Did You Remember To Pack Your Accordion?"
- 2000 "Butt 'n' Box by Joe LaBotz"
- 2003 "On the Bright Side"
- 2005 "Playing Your Requests Vol. 1 - Classic Polkas and Waltzes"
- 2005 "Playing Your Requests Vol. 2 - Timeless Ballroom Melodies"
- 2009 "The First Forty Years"
- 2014 "WEAK Polka Pontoon"
- 2016 "The Holidays In Music"
- 2018 "Positively Polka"
- 2019 "Emergency" (single)
- 2019 "Country Christmas Collection"
- 2020 "Broken Mirrors" (single)
- 2020 "Light the Way" (single)
- 2020 "Polka Band" (single)
- 2021 "Cruisin' in My Crown Vic" (single)
- 2022 "My Daddy Lives On" (single)
- 2022 "In This Quiet Refuge" (single)
- 2022 "Escape to Polka Paradise"
- 2023 "Get Your Butt Down to the Lodge" (single)
- 2023 "How Much I Love You" (single)
- 2023 "I'm Yours" (single)
- 2023 "Go Rest High on That Mountain - A Musical Tribute to Steve Meisner" (single)
- 2023 "Back to the '80s" (EP)
