= The Chardon Polka Band =

American Cleveland-Style polka band

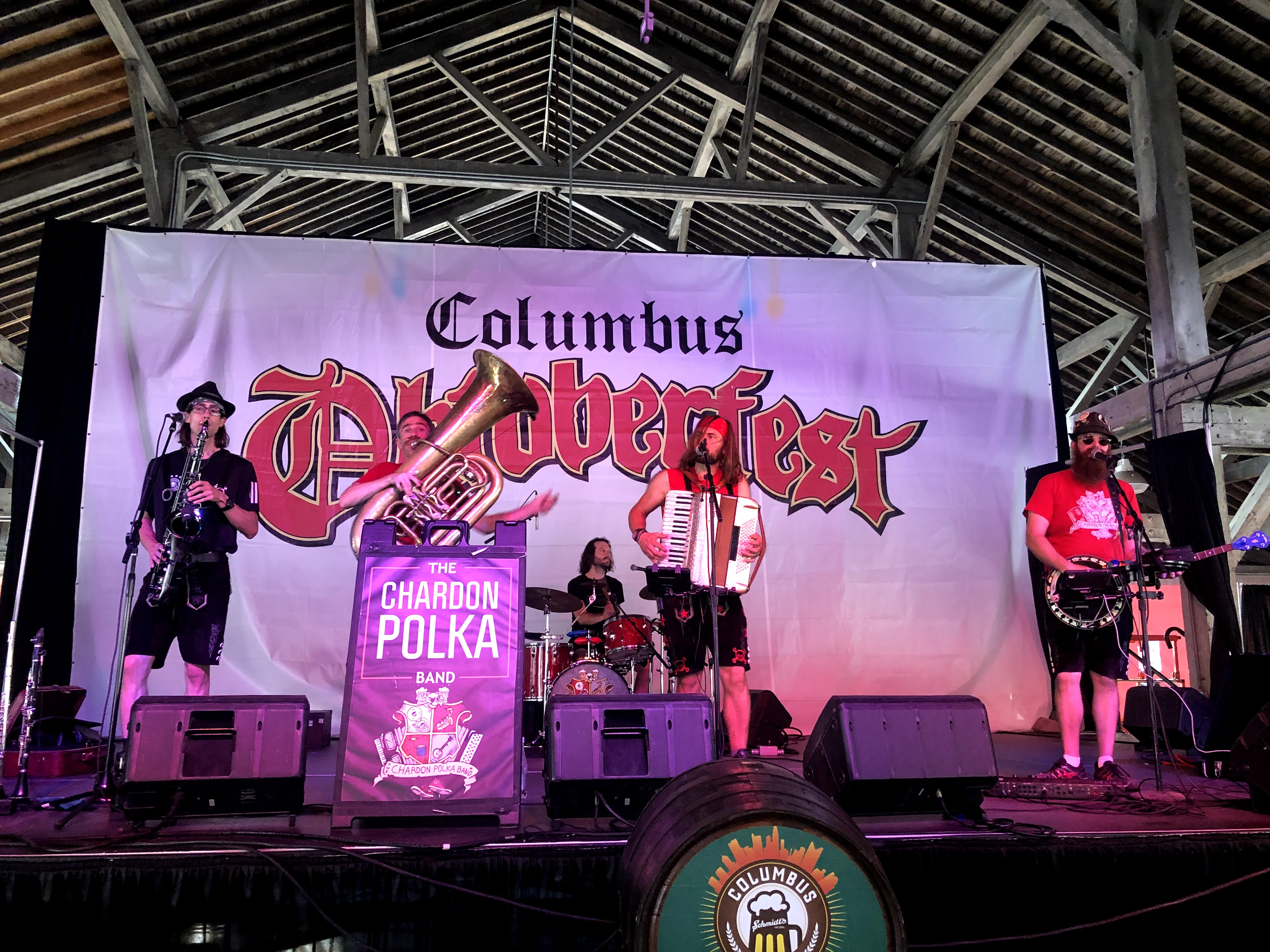
- The Chardon Polka Band performing at the Columbus Oktoberfest

Background information
- Also known as: Chardon High School Polka Band
- Origin: Chardon, OH, USA
- Genres: Polka
- Years active: 2003–present
- Members: Jacob Kouwe, Emily Kouwe, Mike Franklin, Mitch Lawrence, Bob Young
- Past members: Joe Dahlhausen, Paul Coates, Paul "Pops" Magooch
- Website: http://chardonpolkaband.com

The Chardon Polka Band is an American, Ohio-based, Cleveland-Style polka band. It was started by Jake Kouwe in 2003 when he recruited four other teenagers to form a polka band at Chardon High School, and the group was originally called "The Chardon High School Polka Band" and included an accordion, trumpet, saxophone, clarinet, electric guitar, and tuba. The group got their start in the school's music room and played at local senior centers and nursing homes in the Chardon area. Kouwe cites Weird Al Yankovic as his inspiration for playing the accordion as he started lessons on the accordion after seeing Yankovic in a VH1 special. The popular satirist remains a role model for The Chardon Polka Band. The band had slowly gained notoriety among Polka fans and in the Cleveland music scene in general, but got mainstream attention when they were featured in a reality show named Polka Kings on Reelz in 2015, even though the show was quickly cancelled. The band currently plays over 200 shows a year and has grown to be one of the Cleveland music scene's most recognizable performers playing at a mixture of festivals, schools, nursing homes, and bars, but also tours nationally and headlines many of the nation's top folk festival and Oktoberfest celebrations, playing a mixture of original music, classic polkas, and covers of pop songs. The band was also one of the founding members of the Cleveland revival of Dyngus Day. The band has released ten full-length albums, all independently, four of which were nominated for a Polka Hall of Fame award for either the album or one or more songs.

== Band members ==
- Jacob Kouwe - Lead vocals and accordion
- Brian Brazier- Tuba, flugelhorn
- Mike Franklin - Lead and backup vocals including yodeling, banjo, and guitar
- Mitch Lawrence - Saxophone, clarinet, flute
- Bob Young - Drums
- Bob Buzecan - Accordion, piano/keyboard

== Seasonal Member ==
- Michael Grkman - Upright Bass, Bass Guitar

== Past members ==
- Paul Coates - Sousaphone/tuba, electric guitar
- Paul "Pops" Magooch - Drums
- Joe Dahlhausen - Drums
- Emily Kouwe - Saxophone

== Awards and Media coverage ==
- The Polka Hall of Fame has nominated the band in 4 separate years, and the International Polka Association has nominated them in 2016.
  - In 2011, the band's first single Free Beer Polka was nominated for best Best New Original Song.
  - In 2013, A Fistful Of Polka & Bring Me More Beer were both nominated for Best New Original Song and the band was nominated for Band of the Year.
  - In 2016, You Can't Drink Beer In Outer Space was nominated for Best New Original Song and the album World War Polka was nominated for recording of the year. and "You can't take my Polka from Me" was nominated for Song of the Year.
  - In 2018, the album Old Time Tent Revival was nominated for recording of the year.
- The band created a pilot for a variety program called “Lights! Camera! Polka!” in 2017. The show is an assortment of performances, humor, and education.
- The band was the subject of a 16 episode reality show named Polka Kings on Reelz in 2015.
- The band has produced over a twenty music videos. A few of these videos: Squeeze Box, O Tannenbaum, The Krampus Song, and Jingle Bells were made in a clay animation style by superdaddytv.com, the latter three of which were included in a 30-minute Holiday Special.
- The band was featured nationally on Here and Now (NPR) in 2015.
- The band was on and episode of Trip Flip (Travel Channel) named "Ohio: Polka Plane Plunge" in 2015.
- Jacob Kouwe was named one of Cleveland's Most Interesting People 2015 due to the success of the band.
- The band produced the documentaries Polka Across America, A Polka Christmas with The Chardon Polka Band and The World According to Polka which all first aired on PBS Western Reserve and was rebroadcast on other PBS stations across the country.
  - The World According to Polka won a Lower Great Lakes Emmy Award for TALENT: PERFORMER/HOST/NARRATOR and was nominated for entertainment Program at the 55th Annual Great Lakes Emmy® Awards.

== Discography ==
- Pirates, Women, and Beer (2009)
- A Fistful of Polka (2013)
- This is Oktoberfest (Recorded Live at the Helen, Georgia Oktoberfest, 2014)
- Polka Round the Christmas Tree (Christmas album, 2015)
- World War Polka (Released Dyngus Day, 2016)
- Old Time Tent Revival (A collection of hymns, 2017)
- More of the Same… and Probably Worse (Live album, 2017)
- Pony in the Backseat (Kids album, 2018)
- OH NO! NOT AGAIN! (Covers and live album, 2020)
- A Very Polka Christmas (Christmas album, 2020)
