= Don Peachey =

- Born: July 21, 1933; Burnett, Wisconsin, United States
- Died: January 23, 2025 (aged 91) Fond du Lac, Wisconsin, United States
- Genres: Polka, waltz foxtrot, swing
- Occupations: Musician, recording artist
- Instrument: Accordion
- Label: Cadet
- Formerly of: Don Peachey Band, Don Peachey and His Orchestra

Don Peachey (July 21, 1933 – January 23, 2025) was an American band leader, accordionist, musician and recording artist who had performed and recorded since the 1950s with The Don Peachey Band, aka Don Peachey and His Orchestra. Peachey was elected to the International Polka Hall of Fame in 2011 by the International Polka Association.

== Early years ==
Born on July 21, 1933, Don Peachey was from Burnett, Wisconsin. He started playing the accordion at age 14, taking lessons from the Beaver Dam Music Center. While he was a junior in high school, he formed his own polka band and their first paying engagement was at the Fairwater Civic Center in the Village of Fairwater, Wisconsin in June 1951, the same year Peachey graduated from Horicon High School, Horicon, Wisconsin. He then spent two years in the Army, serving in the 1st Cavalry Division and stationed in Japan. He then returned to his home in Burnett and resumed his musical career. Peachey released his first recording in 1957. The group continued to perform and record for over 65 years.

== Recording artist and performer ==
Don Peachey led music groups by two names during his professional recording and performing career; Don Peachey and His Orchestra and later, The Don Peachey Band. Peachey recorded 18 Albums/CDs, including a popular novelty song called "Horsie Keep Your Tail Up." Peachey made an early name for himself in the late 1950s and early 1960s as Billboard Magazine frequently covered the band through its "Talent Topics" section covering bands' touring and performing schedule and also gave the songs, No No Polka and Morning Star Polka 4 Star Reviews. In 1959 Billboard Magazine labeled the band's recordings of the Jigsaw Polka 45 RPM record as "Sprightly... Polka themes given a springy instrumental treatment." The band toured the United States from Wisconsin to Texas for over 50 years. They appeared with Dan Rather on the CBS Evening News during a Patriotic Special and have performed at the largest Polka Venues in the United States. Don Peachey said he believes his success is directly related to how much he practices even after over 50 years of performing. As Peachey stated "(I) heartily agree with piano player Victor Borge's observation," "If I don't practice for a day, I can tell the difference, If I don't practice for two days my critics can tell the difference, and if I don't practice for three days, my audience can tell the difference." Don Peachey had been a guest performer on RFD-TV with Molly B and numerous other telecasts over the years. Peachey helped start Volksfest in Waupun, Wisconsin. His band averaged one to three engagements a week and had five to seven members, including his son John Peachey.

== Awards ==
Peachey was elected "Bandleader of the Year" by the Wisconsin Orchestra Leaders Association in 1973 and was inducted into the Wisconsin Polka Hall of Fame twice in 1998 as a recipient of both the Lifetime Achievement and the Senior awards. In 2011 he was inducted into the International Polka Hall of Fame in the "Pioneer" category for "significant contributions in the advancement of polka music." In 2011, Peachey received a special citation from the Legislature of the State of Wisconsin recognizing his achievements and accomplishments in the music field. He is listed in The Heritage Registry of Who's Who.

== Death ==
Peachey died on January 23, 2025, in Fond du Lac, Wisconsin.

== Discography ==
The Don Peachey Band

- Peachey Dancing (Cuca Records)
- 1959, Happy Polka Dance Party (Domino Records #100)
- 1961, Happy Polka Dance Party, Volume II (Cadet Records #101)
- 1966, Dance and Swing Out (Cadet Records #102)
- 1971, Musically Yours (Cadet Records #103)
- 1973, Early Hits and Bandstand Favorites (Cadet Records #104)
- 1973, Lucky Polka Favorites (Cadet Records #105)
- 1974, Collector's Choice (Cadet Records #106)
- 1976, Let's Go Dancing (Cadet Records #107)
- 1980, Dancing On A Cloud (Cadet Records #108)
- 1983, Pretty Rainbow (Cadet Records #109)
- 1986, No Dance Like a Polka Dance (Cadet Records #110)
- 19??, We Love Christmas (Cadet Records #111)
- 19??, Music Does It (Cadet Records #112)
- 19??, Music on The Move (Cadet Records #113)
- 2004, What Goes on Here? (Cadet Records #114)
- 2007, Some Funtastic Fox Trots ... and Other Treasures (Cadet Records #115)
- 20??, A Picture in Time (Cadet Records #116)

=== 45 RPM records ===
- Don Peachey: "Jigsaw Polka/Red Wine Polka"
- Don Peachey and His Orchestra: "For You My Love; Thanks For A Wonderful Evening" (Cadet Records)
- Don Peachey and His Orchestra: "Last Chance Polka/Forsaken Love Waltz" (Domino Records)
- Don Peachey and His Band: "Singing In The Kitchen / Paloma Blanca" (Cadet Records)
- Don Peachey and His Orchestra: "Dixieland Polka / Last Night On The Back Porch" (Cadet Records)
- Don Peachey and His Orchestra: "Good Morning Polka / Mayme's Polka" (Cadet Records)
- Don Peachey and His Orchestra: "Country Boy Polka / Doodle Doo" (Cadet Records)
- Don Peachey: "After Sundown – Polka / Swiss Lullaby"
- Don Peachey: "Cherry Pickers Polka/Without a Thin" (Cadet Records)
- Don Peachey: "Don't Cry Anna/No Beer Today" (Cadet Records)
- Don Peachey: "I love Everybody/Skirts" Cadet Records
- Don Peachey: "Jolly Musicians Polka/She Don't Wanna" (Cadet Records)
- Don Peachey: "Spanish Two Step/You Can't Take It With You" (Cadet Records)
- Don Peachey: "Swill Lullaby/After Sundown Polka"

== See also ==
- List of accordionists
