= The Knewz =

The Knewz is a polka band based in Buffalo, New York, which was started in 1990 by Mike Burka, Tom Picciano, and Tommy Wanderlich. The band plays many original songs, covers of country and rock songs, and also traditional Polish polkas, obereks, and waltzes.

In 2008, The Knewz received two awards from the United States Polka Association: Favorite Recording of the Year, Headlinez, and Favorite Song of the Year, "When I Call Your Name", written by Tommy Wanderlich. Occasionally, fans of the band would bring cue cards with the words to songs on them as Wanderlich would often forget the lyrics. This is believed to have been started by Wisconsin native, Debbie Dunaj.

== Touring ==
Throughout their existence The Knewz has toured most of the northeast and midwestern states. They’ve developed followings in New York, Massachusetts, Pennsylvania, New Jersey, Ohio, Michigan, Illinois and Wisconsin. They’re also a regular booking for most of the major polka festivals held in the U.S. They’ve also performed internationally as the band has participated in several polka cruises that have traveled to Mexico, several countries in Central America and the Caribbean.

== Members ==
- Andy Bojczuk - drums, vocals
- John Fomenko - accordion
- Tom Picciano - trumpet, clarinet, vocals
- Brian Urbanczyk - bass guitar
- Jimmy Weber - clarinet, vocals
- John Zelasko - trumpet, concertina, accordion, vocals

== Past members ==
- Mike Burka - trumpet, vocals
- Tommy Wanderlich - concertina, clarinet, saxophone, vocals

== Discography ==
Date of Release	Title	Label	Notes
1990	Have You Heard The Knewz?	Sunshine Records	
2006	Spread The Knewz	Sunshine Records	
2007	Headlinez	Sunshine Records	2008 USPA Recording of the Year
2008	4th Edition	Sunshine Records	2009 IPA Recording of the Year
2009	Got Knewz?	Sunshine Records	
2011	Knewz Flash	Sunshine Records	
2013	Eyewitness Knewz	Peach22 Records	
2015	Breaking Knewz	Peach22 Records	
2017	Holidayz	Peach22 Records	
