= Echo Echo (disambiguation) =

Echo Echo is a Carbon Leaf studio album (2001).

Echo Echo may also refer to:

- Echo Echo, an IAMX acoustic album (2020)
- Echo Echo, a character in the Ben 10 media franchise

== See also ==
- "ECHO, Echo echo", a 1957 song
- Echo (disambiguation)
