= The Vadnals =

American polka style music group

The Vadnals were an American polka style music group.

The Vadnals were assembled by the brothers with the surname Vadnal, they were Slovene immigrants in United States. Vadnals were mostly recognised by playing Slovenian style polka, which was popular in Cleveland and across the United States. The group was touring around the world during the 1970s and 1980s and was also popular in the homeland among the Slovenes in Slovenia. They also played a couple of times on Slovenian immigrant meetings in Slovenia. Their most famous songs were : Ta glažek je prazen, No Beer Today, Oj, volodje morja

== Members ==
- Richie Vadnal
- Johnny Vadnal
- Tony Vadnal
- Frank Vadnal
- Frank Mahnic
- Bill Snick
- Joe Stradiot

== Discography ==
- RICHIE VADNAL’S ORCHESTRA - V IS FOR VADNAL - Cuca Records K-2069
- RICHIE VADNAL’S ORCHESTRA - HERE’S CHEERS - Delta Records DI-7009
- RICHIE VADNAL’S ORCHESTRA - POLKA-RE POLKA-RA - Delta Records DI-7011
- RICHIE VADNAL’S ORCHESTRA - VADNALS IN EUROPE - Delta Records DI-7018
- ANSAMBEL RICHIE VADNAL - TA GLAZEK JE PRAZEN - Helidon Records SLP 04-18
- ANSAMBEL RICHIE VADNAL - V SOBOTO ZVECER - Helidon Records FLP-04-025
- ANSAMBEL RICHIEJA VADNALA - STARA LJUBEZEN - Helidon Records FLP-04-033
- ANSAMBEL RICHIEJA VADNALA - POZDRAV DOMACEMU KRAJU - Helidon Records FLP-04-037
- THE VADNALS - INSTRUMENTALLY - AND RAY GAY'S MUSIC - Normandy Records D1-7161
- RICHIE VADNAL’S ORCHESTRA - GREEN VALLEY - CBV Records 108008
- RICHIE VADNAL’S ORCHESTRA - GREEN VALLEY - CBV Records 108008
- RICHIE VADNAL’S ORCHESTRA - POLKA YOUR TROUBLES AWAY - One M Records1007
- (2004) RICHIE VADNAL’S ORCHESTRA - POLKA-RE POLKA-RA - Normandy Records NCD-7166
- (2010) RICHIE VADNAL - THE VADNAL BROTHERS - FULL CIRCLE - Kravos Recordings 2010

== See also ==
- Slovenian-style polka
- Frankie Yankovich
