= Thomas Gleeson =

Thomas or Tom Gleeson may refer to:

- Thomas Gleeson (Australian politician), member of the New South Wales Legislative Council
- Thomas Gleeson (American politician), member of the Wisconsin State Assembly
- Tom Gleeson, Australian stand-up comedian, writer, television and radio presenter
- Tom Gleeson (rugby union), Irish rugby union player
- Tom Gleeson (rugby league), Australian rugby league player
