= George's Ballroom =

Ballroom in New Ulm, Minnesota

Coordinates: 44°18′49″N 94°27′28″W

George's Ballroom was a ballroom in New Ulm, Minnesota, United States that was built in 1947 and became a popular spot for young couples reuniting after World War II. Performers such as Lawrence Welk, The Andrews Sisters, Glenn Miller and the Six Fat Dutchmen all played there, and in its heyday it was an important center for big bands and polka music. George's Ballroom was listed as a contributing property to the New Ulm Commercial Historic District.

The colorful art deco building is a symbol of the small-town ballrooms that were the center of weekend activity is rural America. The ballroom also housed a bowling alley, restaurant and bar. The building closed in 1991 due to declining interest in big bands, ballroom dancing and polka.

The complex was acquired by Brown County in a tax foreclosure case. The building was later sold at auction and the new owner made plans to renovate and re-open the historical complex. The Minnesota Historical Society funded a study, completed in 2003, and a preservation architect team was hired to restore the building to its former glory. The ballroom re-opened, but its ultimate fate was uncertain as of early 2007 due to a disagreement between the owner and the City of New Ulm.

The property became tax-forfeit again in July 2019. The Brown County board of commissioners authorized its demolition in September 2019.
