= Verona Grove =

American pop punk band

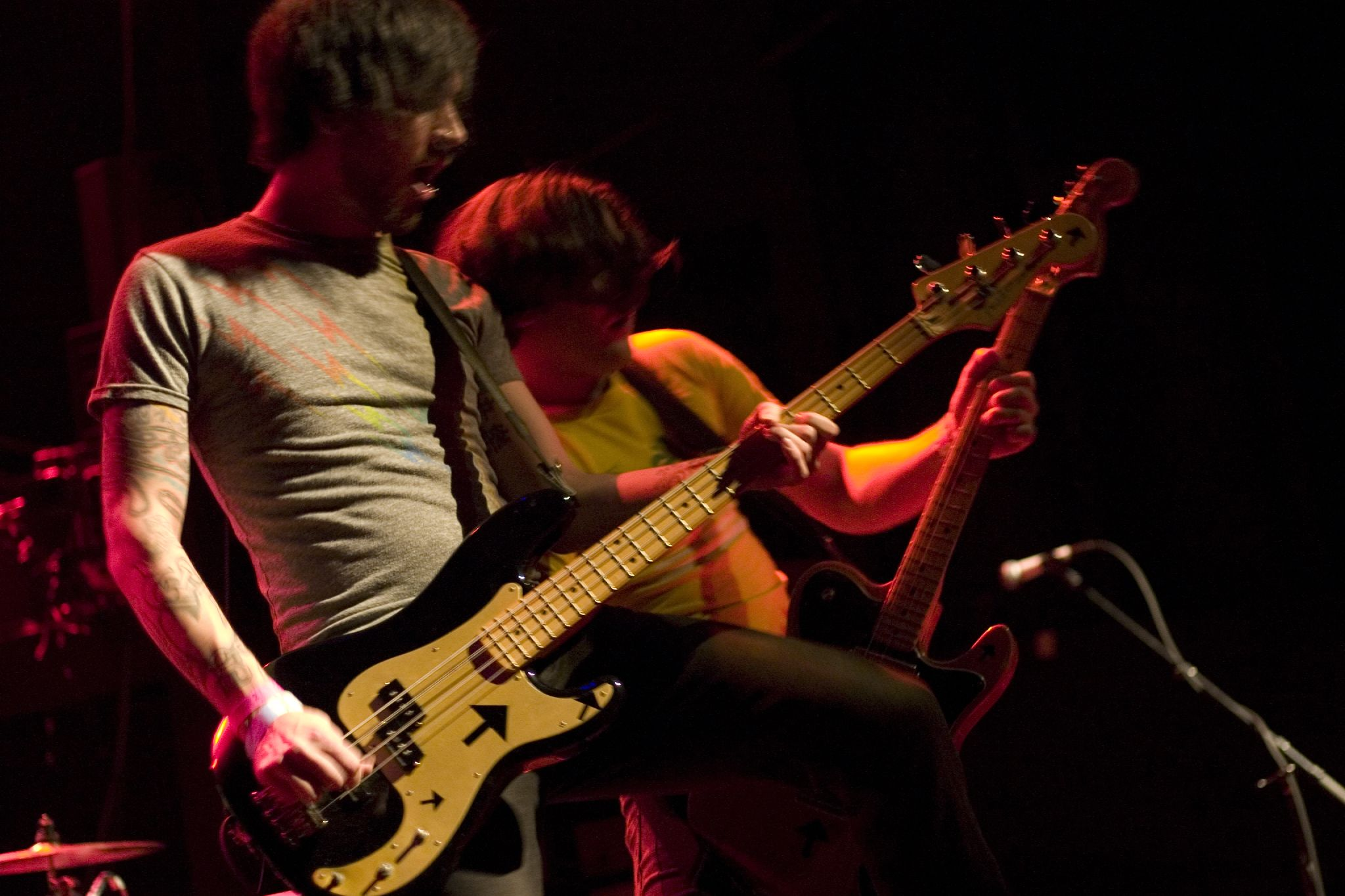
- Verona Grove in 2007 concert

Background information
- Origin: Fond du Lac, Wisconsin, U.S.
- Genres: Pop punk
- Years active: 2000–
- Labels: Pat's Record Company (Universal Records subsidiary)
- Past members: Tony Anders; Charlie Wilhelm; Josh Helm; Tony Zar; Max Harder

Verona Grove is an American pop punk band from Fond du Lac, Wisconsin. The band is signed to Pat's Record Company, a subsidiary of Universal Records. Members include singer/guitarist Tony Anders, bass guitar/background singer Charlie Wilhelm, and drummer Josh Helm. The Wisconsin Area Music Industry Awards nominated Verona Grove for their 2009 artist of the year, and it won the 2009 Rock Artist of the Year.

== History ==
The band formed as high school students in Fond du Lac in early 2000. In 2003, the band beat around 100 bands to win the "Big Gig Competition" hosted on Summerfest.com, which led to a set opening for Sum 41 at Summerfest 2003. The band released their first album "Half Tanked" in 2003, after they were students at the University of Wisconsin–Oshkosh. They recorded a track at Smart Studios in Madison, Wisconsin. The track was sent by the studio's engineer to record labels which led to the group getting signed in early 2006 to Pat's Record Company in Hollywood. The trio moved to Hollywood and recorded the album The Story Thought Over with production from Jamie Arentzen of American Hi-Fi. The album was released in August 2007.

== Discography ==
=== Albums ===
- "Half Tanked" (June 2003)
- "From the Tablet to the Towers" (2005 EP)
- "The Story Thought Over" (August 2007)
- "Away From Expected EP (October 2009)"

=== Singles ===
- "Goodbye Surrender"
- "Revolution" (2008)
- "Las Vegas Nights (2009)"

The song "Revolution" was picked up by area radio station WIXX. It was the radio station's first song by a local band to hit on their nightly "Top 9 at 9" request show. The band performed the song live on the night that it hit #1 video.

== Concerts / Tours ==
The group has opened for Plain White Tees and the Goo Goo Dolls, which led to two brief appearances on E! Entertainment. They toured the West Coast of the United States to support "The Story Thought Over" with a 39-date "Joy Ride" tour. The group has played at Summerfest for several years.
