= Grimms, Wisconsin =

- Unincorporated community
- Location within Wisconsin Location within the United States
- Coordinates: 44°08′46″N 87°54′06″W
- Country: United States
- State: Wisconsin
- County: Manitowoc
- Elevation: 840 ft (260 m)
- Time zone: UTC-6 (Central (CST))
  - Summer (DST): UTC-5 (CDT)
- Area code: 920
- GNIS feature ID: 1577623

Grimms is an unincorporated community located in the town of Cato, Manitowoc County, Wisconsin, United States.

== History ==
A post office called Grimms was established in 1874, and remained in operation until it was discontinued in 1955. Grimms was named in honor of a local pioneer settler.

== Notable people ==
- Thomas Gleeson, farmer and Wisconsin State Representative; lived in Grimms
- Romy Gosz, polka musician; born in Grimms
