= Six Fat Dutchmen =

American polka band

Harold Loeffelmacher, circa 1957

The Six Fat Dutchmen was an American polka band, formed around 1932 by Harold Loeffelmacher in New Ulm, Minnesota, United States. The band was known mostly for playing the German-American (sometimes called "oom-pah") style of polka music that originated from Germany and the German-speaking areas of Czechoslovakia. They were regular performers at the then-famous George's Ballroom in New Ulm, and were voted Number One Polka Band for seven years in a row by the National Ballroom Operators Association. Compilations of their music continue to be produced and sold, more than 70 years after the band's founding.

Like Bill Monroe's Bluegrass Boys, the band provided the name to its musical genre, "Dutchman Music". As might be surmised from the band's name, there were initially six members, but over time it grew to include about a dozen musicians. The band appeared often on a local television station in Mankato, Minnesota, and their popularity grew to the point where they played the Nebraska State Fair for 26 straight years. The Six Fat Dutchmen played the Aragon and Trianon ballrooms in Chicago, broadcasting live on radio station WGN.

They enjoyed a 14-year recording career with RCA Victor, during which they recorded 800 songs. After parting ways with RCA, the band recorded for Dot Records for ten years.

The 1995 compilation CD The Six Fat Dutchmen's Greatest Hits earned a 3.5 star rating (out of 5) in AllMusic. Another compilation, Greatest Hits Volume 2 was released in 2006.

Some of their vintage television appearances have been uploaded to YouTube. Singer and saxophone player Dick Dale was briefly a member of the Six Fat Dutchmen, before he became a regular on the long-running American television variety series, The Lawrence Welk Show.

In 1990, three years after the death of Harold Loeffelmacher, he and his Six Fat Dutchmen were inducted into the Minnesota Music Hall of Fame.

== Partial discography ==
- 6 Fat Dutchmen (RCA Victor LSP-1769) 1958
- Schottisches (1959)
- Polka Parade! (Hamilton Records, HLP 121) 1964
- On Tour (Dot DLP 25734) 1960s
- Polkas: Greatest Hits! (Dot DLP 25358) 1961
- Polka's No. 1 Band (Polka City PC-402) 1970s
- Ten Fat Hits! (Pickwick SPC-3083) 1970s
- Greatest Hits (Ross) 1995
- Greatest Hits (Polka City PC-6656) 2002
- Greatest Hits Vol. 2 (Polka City PC-1028) 2006
