= 70 Years of Hits =

Compilation album by Frankie Yankovic
- Released: 1985
- Genre: Polka
- Label: Our Heritage

Professional ratings
Review scores
Source	Rating
Allmusic	2.5/5 stars

70 Years of Hits is a compilation album by Frankie Yankovic, released through Our Heritage Records in 1985. The title refers to Yankovic having turned 70 years old that year. In 1986, the album won Yankovic the Grammy Award for Best Polka Recording.

== Track listing ==
No.	Title	Length
1.	"Zivili Brace, Zivili Sestra" (Krizancich)	3:11
2.	"Hey Little Sweetheart" (Yankovic)	2:43
3.	"Blue Skirt Waltz" (Blaha, Parish)	2:58
4.	"Cleveland the Polka Town" (Lausche, Yankovic)	2:18
5.	"Corrida #1/Serenata"	3:20
6.	"Just Because" (Robin, Shelton, Shelton)	2:39
7.	"Beer Barrel Polka" (Brown, Timm)	3:04
8.	"Beer Drinking Song"	2:48
9.	"The Slovenian Waltz Medley" (traditional)	6:19
10.	"Looking Back"	3:18

== Personnel ==
- Michael Bishop – mastering
- Dorothy Hock – vocals
- William Lausche – composer
- Joey Miskulin – arranger, musician, producer, vocals
- Steve Popovich – executive producer
- Gary Rhamy – engineer
- Leo Robin – composer
- Bob Shelton – composer
- Joe Shelton – composer
- Larry Sintic – musician
- Ron Sluga – musician
- Dave Wolnick – musician
- Frankie Yankovic – accordion, composer, musician, vocals
- Robert Yankovic – musician

== See also ==
- Polka in the United States
