= Polka Floyd =

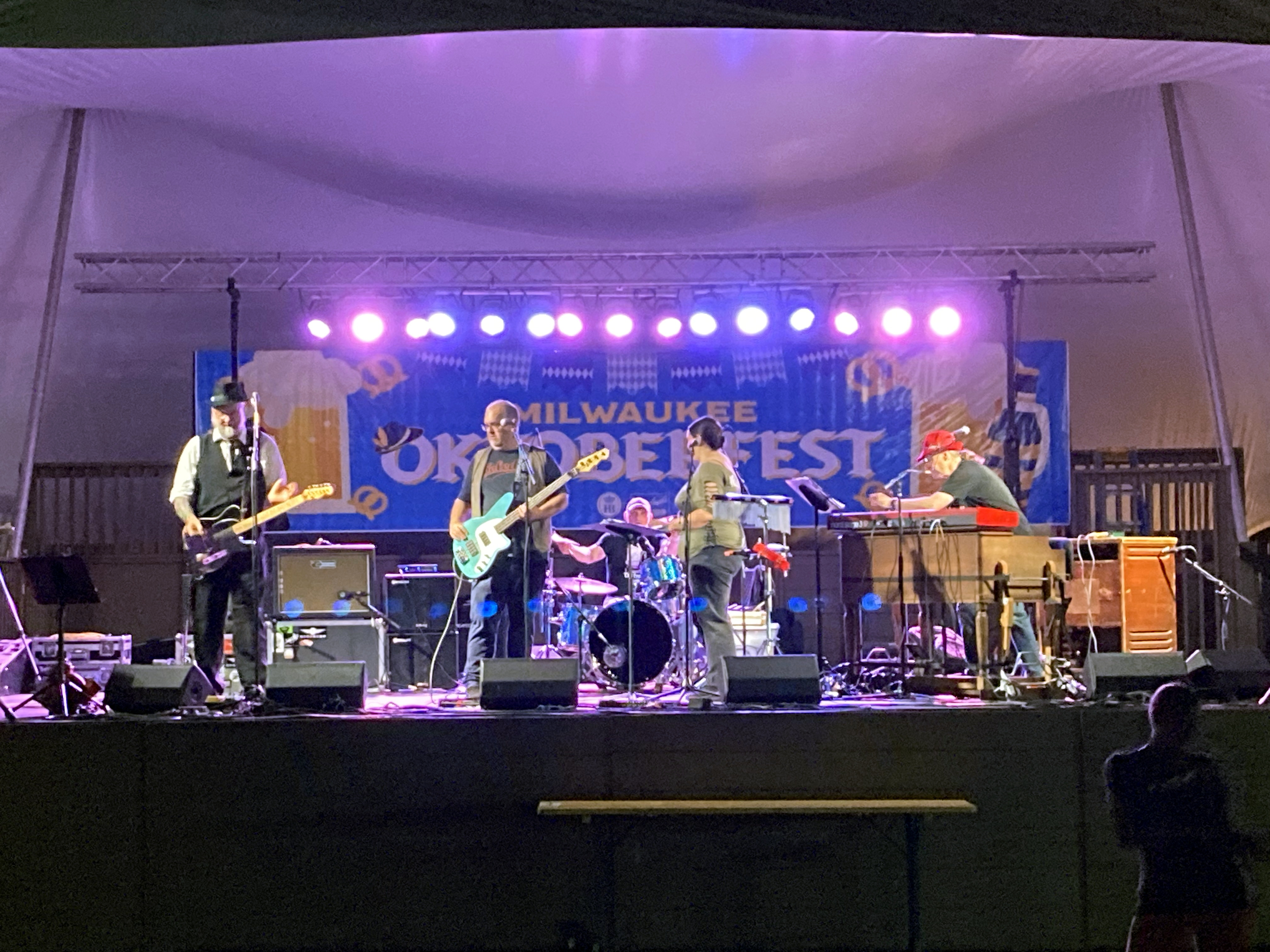
- Polka Floyd performing at Milwaukee Oktoberfest

Background information
- Origin: Toledo, Ohio and Detroit, Michigan, USA
- Genres: Polka, Tribute, Cover Band
- Years active: 2006 – Present
- Members: Ken Haas; Chris Zielinski; Penny Haas; Frank Dramczyk
- Past members: Eric Hite
- Website: www.PolkaFloyd.com

Polka Floyd is an American band that covers many Pink Floyd songs by using the accordion to introduce polka into the music. One reviewer commented, "Cutting a vast swath across Pink's entire discography, the band injects the late great classic rock band's music with much-needed fun." The band plays "more than 40 Pink Floyd songs, mostly from 1968 to 1979." The band has shared bills with Unknown Hinson, əkoostik hookah, and The Toasters. One reviewer has said the band's first album is "like the antidote to angst" and "[f]reak show Floyd for the 21st century, ya gotta love it."

The band was established in 2006. "'We're more of a rock band with a polka edge than a polka band with a rock edge,' said Ken Haas, lead singer and the one who started the band’s sound by accident."

As one reviewer said, "Well this whole thing just kicks ass. And let me say it again, the guitar works by Ken Haas is remarkable. .... There'll be no more AAAAAAGHHH................but there will be more EE-I EE-I- EE- I- OO."

== Personnel ==
- Ken Haas - lead vocals, guitar
- Chris Zielinski - bass guitar, vocals
- Penny Haas - keyboards
- Frank Dramczyk - drums

== Discography ==
- The Polka Floyd Show (2007)
- Live at the Ohio Theatre (2009)
