= Roger Bright =

American polka musician (1937-2001)

- Born: February 12, 1937; New Glarus, Wisconsin, U.S.
- Died: August 28, 2001 (aged 64) Boulder, Colorado, U.S.
- Genres: Polka
- Occupations: musician, songwriter, composer, record producer, deejay
- Instruments: accordion, voice

Roger Bright (February 12, 1937 – August 28, 2001) was an American polka musician from New Glarus, Wisconsin. He played mostly Slovenian-style (or "Cleveland style") polka music with a "mellow touch" and "a Swiss lilt." As one of the most important Wisconsin polka musicians, he is known for popularizing the town of New Glarus ("America's Little Switzerland") among the polka community, and New Glarus' annual Polkafest is held every year in his honor.

== Musical career ==
Roger Bright was born in New Glarus, Wisconsin, and began playing the accordion at age 12. He formed his first band at 15, and made his first recording at 19. While on tour in Slovenia he met Slavko Avsenik, who inspired him to add more Slovenian elements into his sound. Over the course of his career he played in 33 US states as well as 12 tours to Europe and Canada, both with his own band as well as playing in bands with Frankie Yankovic, Joey Miskulin, Slavko Avsenik, and many others. He is also notable for collaborating with Swiss-American yodeler and hotel owner Robie Schneider, who owned the famous New Glarus Hotel, which employed Bright's band as the house band for many years.

He recorded 35 albums over the course of his career, for Cuca Records as well as his own self-founded polka record label Bright Productions. He performed concerts with the St. Louis Pops Orchestra around the country, and appeared on TV shows such as The Tonight Show with Johnny Carson, The Phil Donahue Show, The Charlotte Peters Show, and Don McNeill's Breakfast Club.

== Death ==
Bright died on August 28th, 2001, at Boulder Community Hospital in Boulder, Colorado. He suffered a heart attack while performing on stage at a polka festival in Boulder, and died shortly after.

== Awards ==
Bright was inducted into the Wisconsin Polka Hall of Fame in 2000, the National Cleveland Style Polka Hall of Fame in 2002, and the International Polka Association Hall of Fame in 2003. He received official commendations from Wisconsin governor Tommy Thompson and from the state of Michigan, a key to the city of Grand Haven, Michigan, and numerous other awards throughout his home state of Wisconsin.
