= Don Lee (accordionist) =

American multi-instrumentalist, music teacher and music publisher

- Born: Donald Lee Bloomquist; December 11, 1930; Lansing, MI
- Died: July 21, 2015 (aged 84) Hendersonville, TN
- Genres: Pop music
- Occupation: Musician
- Instruments: Accordion, clarinet and other instruments
- Labels: Blue Chip Records, Jubilee. Lee Records

Don Lee (December 11, 1930 – July 21, 2015) was an American accordionist, multi-instrumentalist, music teacher, music publisher, record label owner, studio owner and electronics enthusiast who is most remembered for his reverb effect instrumental hit "ECHO, Echo echo" in 1957. He also has a place in Space Age Pop history.

== Background ==
Lee had an interest in electronics and how things worked which was sparked off from when he was eight years old. He was given a train set and would run it throughout his house as well as taking it apart to see how it worked. He also was experimenting with things and was told by his mother to keep out of the kitchen. By then the interest in electronics had taken hold. Also the same year he was given an accordion by his father and started taking lessons. At some stage he grew tired of the lessons and the routine and wanted to quit, however his father wouldn't let him. He also played clarinet at the Pattengill junior and Eastern high school bands.

An early inspiration for him was Les Paul with Lee's reasoning that what Paul could do with the guitar, he could do with the accordion.

== Career ==
By the time he was in his early twenties, he had opened the Bloomquist Music Studios which was based in Lansing, Michigan. He started his career as a music teacher and was also recording music professionally. By the time he was in his late twenties, he would have success with a hit making single. The single "ECHO, Echo echo" bw "Charmaine" was released on Blue Chip Records, cat# 0013 in May 1957. On page 34 of the August 19 edition of The Billboard the single was said to be climbing steadily, heading for the charts. On June 29 it was at #2 on the WAAF 950 AM chart. By September 9, it was already being recognized as a hit. It became a hit for him in the Summer of that year. In the Chicago charts it had a run for ten weeks peaking at #18.

By May 1958, his album Crazy Rhythm was released on Jubilee JLP 1067. The tracks included "Caravan", "Lady Be Good" and some compositions by Lee himself. With the aid of overdubbing Lee played all of the backing instruments. The album had a Jazz edge to it and also got a positive review from The Cash Box. Some of the material on the album is regarded by some as Space Age Pop.

Following the success of his single, he toured the country and then came back to Michigan and opened up The Don Lee Studios which was a chain of teaching and recording studios. He toured again in the mid-1960s and spent two seasons performing in the half time breaks for the Harlem Globetrotters with Peg Leg Bates and Homer "Lee" Talboys. In the late 1960s, he worked in the computer industry and still managed to play on weekends and night engagements.

In his last years, around 2011, he was a resident at Pennington Place Senior Living in Hendersonville, TN.. He gave weekly shows there and soon became a favorite. The following year in 2012, he became a finalist in Nashville's senior talent competition, Silver Stars.

== Death ==
Lee died on July 21, 2015, at the age of 84. He was survived by his wife and four children.

== Discography ==
Singles
Act	Release	Catalogue	Year	Notes #
Don Lee	"Charmaine" / "ECHO, Echo echo"	Blue Chip Records 0013	1957	
Don Lee	"Crazy Rhythm" / "Bells Of St. Mary's"	Jubilee 45–5308	1957	
Lee Talboys Don Lee Orch.	"Lovin' Lies" / "When It's Darkness On The Delta"	Palladium Records BB 607	1960	
Lee Talboys & The Don Lee Orch.	"Little Michigan Miss" / "The Way It Used To Be"	Royalty Records Co. R-104		
Colleen Shoemaker with the Don Lee Orchestra	"Evening Song" / "Mackinac Waltz"	Lee Records 867L-3626	1968	

Albums
Act	Release	Catalogue	Year	Notes #
Don Lee	Crazy Rhythm	Jubilee JLP-1067	1968	
