= Alessandra Mignacca =

- Born: circa. 1977/78; Trieste, Friuli-Venezia Giulia, Italy
- Spouse: Unknown
- Children: 3

Alessandra Mignacca (born c. 1977/78), Trieste, Friuli-Venezia Giulia, Italy is a former Italian accordion player and current primary school teacher.

== Biography ==
Mignacca was born in the Italian port city of Trieste, the administrative center of the region Friuli-Venezia Giulia. She learned to play an accordion in early childhood, reached the top in performing arts, has become famous thanks to a virtuoso performance. She participated in international competitions, won the world championship among accordion players, performing folk Slovenian music. She played on the Zupan firm accordion.

Mignacca is married and has three children. She teaches in elementary school. At the present time she does not act as accordion player.
