= Thomas Gleeson (American politician) =

American politician

Thomas Gleeson (December 17, 1847 – May 30, 1912) was an American politician and farmer.

Gleeson was born in Ireland. He moved to Ontario, Canada in 1851. In 1860, Gleeson emigrated to United States and settled in the town of Rockland, Manitowoc County, Wisconsin. Gleeson was a farmer and lived in Grimms, Wisconsin. He served in the Wisconsin Assembly, in 1881, and was a Democrat. Gleeson also served as a commissioner of swamps and overflow lands for Calumet and Manitowoc Counties. He died at his home in Manitowoc, Wisconsin.
