= Slovenian-style polka =

Slovenian-style polka (also known as Cleveland Style polka) is an American style of polka in the Slovenian tradition. It is usually associated with Cleveland and other Midwestern cities.

== Instruments ==
The Slovenian style polka band always includes a piano accordion, chromatic accordion, or the Diatonic button accordion (also called a "button box"). An accordion called the Half Chromatic, often abbreviated half-chrom, is sometimes used. This accordion has a right side similar to a three-row B-system chromatic accordion, but a bass side similar to the Diatonic button accordion. Some bands in Slovenia use keyboard instead of accordion. The other melody instrument is a saxophone or clarinet, and the rhythm instruments include drums, bass, and guitar or banjo. The Avsenik brothers also add a trumpet to their sound. The Slovenian style polka in the United States came about when immigrants from Slovenia taught the old songs to their children. Those children, as adults, translated the old songs from Slovene into English, and arranged them in a polka beat. This began the oral tradition of Cleveland-style polka music.

== History ==
At first, Slovenian style polka was just music for ethnic clubs and union halls. However, the commercial success of Frankie Yankovic (Jankovič) and other musicians soon introduced the genre to a wider audience. William Lausche incorporated the elements of classical music and early jazz. At this point, the style took on a type of swing that can be heard in his piano playing, even on some early Yankovic recordings.

In addition to Frankie Yankovic, the most important pioneers in developing this style of music include Matt Hoyer, Dr. William Lausche, Johnny Pecon, Lou Trebar, Johnny Vadnal, Eddie Habat, and Kenny Bass.

The music heard during scene transitions on The Drew Carey Show is played in Cleveland-style polka to suit the city it is set in.

== Notable musicians ==
- Slavko Avsenik
- Louis Bashell
- Eddie Blazonczyk
- Roger Bright
- Tom Brusky
- The Chardon Polka Band
- The Vadnals
- Verne Meisner
- Walter Ostanek

== See also ==
- Polka Hall of Fame
- International Polka Association
- Music of Slovenia
