= Harold Loeffelmacher =

American polka bandleader (1905–1988)

Background information
- Born: March 14, 1905; Fort Ridgely, Minnesota, U.S.
- Died: January 30, 1988 (aged 82) New Ulm, Minnesota
- Genres: polka
- Instruments: Bass horn, trombone

Harold Loeffelmacher (March 14, 1905 – January 30, 1988) was an American musician and bandleader best known for forming the polka band known as the Six Fat Dutchmen. The band, based in New Ulm, Minnesota, traveled extensively and played as many as 335 dates per year, mostly in the Midwestern United States. Over a span of 14 years the Six Fat Dutchmen recorded 800 polkas, waltzes and schottisches on the RCA Victor label, and for ten years they were signed by Dot Records. Loeffelmacher was inducted into the International Polka Association's Hall of Fame in 1975.

== Biography ==
Loeffelmacher was born in 1905 on a Minnesota farm near Fort Ridgely. After his family moved to New Ulm, he took violin lessons, then moved to wind instruments, including the tuba. Later he took up the trombone, which became his primary band instrument.

In 1932, he started "Six Fat Dutchmen," which grew from the initial six to over a dozen musicians. They played the Nebraska State Fair for 26 straight years.

During Loeffelmacher's long career of touring from show to show, it is claimed that he eventually wore out seven buses while accumulating as much as 90,000 miles of road travel annually. In winter while the other band members would break from their hectic schedules and take well-deserved vacations, Loeffelmacher would often continue to perform solo on the bass horn, but his true instrument was the trombone. He performed a dozen times on the long-running nationally televised TV series, The Lawrence Welk Show.

Loeffelmacher died in 1988 at Sioux Valley Hospital in New Ulm, Minnesota.

In 1990, three years after his death, Harold Loeffelmacher and his Six Fat Dutchmen were inducted into the Minnesota Music Hall of Fame. His son Harold and daughter-in-law Virginia accepted the award on his behalf. His family currently resides near St. Paul/Minneapolis, Minnesota.

In 2006, 74 years after the band's founding, a compilation CD of the Six Fat Dutchmen's original recordings was produced.
