= Louis Bashell =

American polka musician (1914–2008)

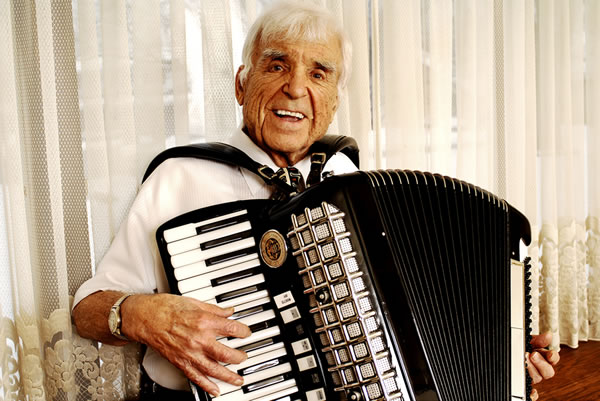
- Bashell in 1987

Background information
- Born: July 1, 1914; Milwaukee, Wisconsin, U.S.
- Died: December 17, 2008 (aged 94); Milwaukee, Wisconsin, U.S.
- Genres: Slovenian-style polka
- Instrument: Accordion

Louis Bashell (July 1, 1914 – December 17, 2008) was an American polka musician from Milwaukee, Wisconsin. He was known for playing the Slovenian-style polka. He was nicknamed "Milwaukee's polka king".

Bashell's band was signed to RCA Victor for eight years. In 1987, he became Wisconsin's first resident to receive a National Heritage Fellowship grant from the National Endowment for the Arts.

== Background ==
Bashell was born in Milwaukee to Slovenian parents. He began playing accordion as a 7 year old, and soon began playing it at his family's "Bashell's Tavern" in the Walker's Point neighborhood. Bashell attended Boys' Tech High School.

== Musical career ==
Bashell formed his first trio in the 1930s. He played accordion and he hired a drummer and saxophone player. Bashell formed a five-piece band in the late 1940s; their recording of the Slovenian folk song, "Zidana Marela," ("Silk Umbrella") was successful. Bashell said "It sold out as fast as they could make the records. Then RCA Victor came along and hired us to make records for them, and we were on the RCA label for almost eight years." RCA wanted Bashell to promote the records on a lengthy national tour, but he refused. He wanted to be close to his wife and children. He later did tours through the "polka belt" in northern United States from North and South Dakota through New Jersey.

Bashell performed at his family's bar for 50 years, as well as house parties, weddings, anniversaries, ballrooms, halls, clubs, bars, and other community-based events in Milwaukee. His albums sold around the United States and worldwide.

Bashell was a trustee in the Wisconsin Polka Hall of Fame in the 2000s.

== Death ==
Bashell stopped performing in the 2000s after his health began declining. He died on December 17, 2008, from complications of pneumonia. He had been fighting Alzheimer's disease for two years at his death. Bashell was interred at Mt. Olivet Cemetery in Milwaukee.

== Awards ==
Bashell was inducted in the Wisconsin Polka Hall of Fame and received a lifetime achievement award from the National Cleveland Style Polka Hall of Fame.

He was nominated for six Wisconsin Area Music Industry's (WAMI) polka awards between 1996 and 2001; he won the award in 1999.

Bashell was a recipient of a 1987 National Heritage Fellowship awarded by the National Endowment for the Arts, which is the United States government's highest honor in the folk and traditional arts.
