= ECHO, Echo echo =

1976 song by Don Lee

Single by Don Lee
- A-side: "Charmaine"
- B-side: "ECHO, Echo echo"
- Released: 1957
- Genre: Pop, space age pop
- Label: Blue Chip Records 0013
- Songwriter(s): Bloomquist

Don Lee singles chronology
| "ECHO, Echo echo" (1957) | "Crazy Rhythm" (1957) |

"ECHO, Echo echo" was a hit for Don Lee in 1957. With its reverb effect it is an early example of Space Age Pop.

== Background ==
The single was issued with "Charmaine" as the A side on Blue Chip Records, cat# 0013 in May 1957. With its happy arrangement and multi tracking of a harmonica, Cash Box said that it could be a big record and gave it a B+. The B side "Echo" was given a C+ with the review saying that the electronic trickery used in "Charmaine" was employed by Lee here in this snappy Affair.

"ECHO, Echo echo" was an instrumental, and the accordion was used as the solo instrument with a steady backing from bass and piano. Ethelyn Sexton the music editor for the Lansing State Journal speculated that the solo effects by Lee with the accordion were the first to be used in this fashion. In Australia it was given a brief mention by The Sydney Morning Herald who referred to it as "Electronic-tricks-with an accordion". It was released there on Prestige PSP 1061.

In addition to being a hit and selling 140,000 copies in Chicago, it was used by a California disk jockey as the theme song on the radio show seven days a week.

== Chart performance ==
In July 1957, Jerry Blaine of Jubilee Records was quoted in Cash Box as saying "We've got nothing but hits" and Lee's single was among the ones he mentioned. By August 19, 1957, it was indicated by The Billboard that the single was climbing steadily and heading for the charts. By September 9, it was already being recognized as a hit.

It became a hit for him in the summer of that year with a ten-week run in Chicago charts, peaking at No. 18.
