= Wisconsin Area Music Industry =

Wisconsin Area Music Industry (WAMI) is an American volunteer organization founded in 1980, and based in Milwaukee, Wisconsin. Its stated purpose is "to educate and recognize the achievements and accomplishments of individuals in the Wisconsin music industry." The organization is best known for its annual awards for Wisconsin musicians from various genres of music. It also hosts seminars and workshops on subjects related to music and the music industry, such as performing, recording and marketing.

== Partnerships and Objectives ==
The WAMI works with several organizations within the local music industry. These groups include:

- Guitar 4 Vets

== Awards ==
WAMI began presenting awards in 1980. It held its award ceremony in Milwaukee until switching to Appleton.

Notable artists who have won the WAMI Artist of the Year award include The Gufs (1998) and Bon Iver (2009).

Members of WAMI's hall of fame include the diverse artists Butch Vig, Al Jarreau, Bob Kames, Liberace, Les Paul, Violent Femmes, and BoDeans.

Other notable artists to receive awards include alternative rock group Garbage, rockers Fever Marlene and Verona Grove, hip hop/rap group Rusty Ps, power pop rock band Yipes! and polka artists Verne Meisner and Louis Bashell. Nominees have included 2009 American Idol contestant Danny Gokey who didn't win that year but won the Male Vocalist the following year.

== Current Board Members ==
Exec Board:

- Roy Elkins - President
- Jessie Greenwald - Vice President
- Steve Brill - Secretary
- Jayna Youker - Treasurer

General Board:

- Pat Nettesheim - Member
- Ann Rakowiecki - Member
- Joey Carini - Member
- Phil Norby - Member
- Danny Faustmann - Member
- Steve Brill - Member
- Marcell Guyton - Member
- Rick Hagopian - Member
- Chris Krebs - Member
- Mike Christian - Member
