= Whoopee John =

American polka musician, 1893-1961

- Born: John Anthony Wilfahrt; May 11, 1893; New Ulm, Minnesota, US
- Died: June 15, 1961 (aged 68)
- Genres: Polka rock
- Instrument: Concertina
- Labels: Vocalion Records, Decca Records

John Anthony Wilfahrt, (May 11, 1893 – June 15, 1961), the eldest son of John Wilfahrt and Barbara Portner, was a professional polka musician who recorded with Vocalion and from 1934, Decca. He went by the moniker "Whoopee John." He was inducted into the International Polka Association's Hall of Fame in 1976.

== Early life and career ==
Wilfahrt was born in New Ulm, Minnesota and got his start playing the concertina at local gatherings and concerts in and around his community. In the 1920s, Whoopee John and his band relocated to Saint Paul, Minnesota, where they became regulars at live shows and on the radio.

Wilfahrt first began recording commercially in the 1920s and signed with the newly formed U.S. division of Decca Records in 1934 as the label's second act. (The first act signed to the label was Bing Crosby.) "Whoopee John" Wilfahrt and his band enjoyed popularity through the 1940s and 50s on the polka circuit. Over the course of his professional career, Wilfahrt recorded nearly 1,000 songs, the most popular being “Mariechen Waltz” and “Clarinet Polka.”

== Death ==
He died of a heart attack in 1961 at age 68.

== Sources ==
- "Some Wilfahrt Tales" by Jeff Wilfahrt, 1998, on record with Brown County Minnesota Historical Society.
- Whoopee John Wilfahrt biography - International Polka Association
