= Verne Meisner =

American polka musician

- Born: December 4, 1938; Milwaukee, Wisconsin, United States
- Died: June 10, 2005 (aged 66) Waukesha, Wisconsin, United States
- Genre: playing Cleveland-style polka
- Instrument: accordion
- Spouse(s): Judith Ann Kutz (divorced); Shirley Tyson (died)
- Award: inducted into five halls of fame

LaVerne Donald "Verne" Meisner (December 4, 1938 – June 10, 2005) was an American polka musician born in Milwaukee, Wisconsin, and raised in Whitewater, Wisconsin. He was inducted into five halls of fame, including the International Polka Association Hall of Fame as a "Living Legend" in 1989. He is best known for the songs "Memories of Vienna" and "El Rio Drive."

Meisner was known for playing Cleveland-style polka waltzes. Radio personality George Mlay said, "No one can play a waltz like Meisner." He released 30 singles and 20 LPs/CDs, wrote over 60 songs, and sold approximately one million records in his career. He toured the United States, Canada, Europe, and Hawaii, playing 200 to 250 dates per year for 40 years.

== Career ==
Meisner began playing polka music in a band as an 11-year-old after receiving his first accordion as an 8-year-old. He attended dances and learned how to play music by ear after several months of listening to Frankie Yankovic's music on his phonograph. Meisner formed his first band, which began performing in 1950 as "Verne Meisner and the Polka Boys". He briefly toured with Yankovic in 1955.

His first recordings were created in 1957 when the band recorded the original tracks "Memories of Vienna Waltz" and "Polka Dancers Polka" on the Paragon Label. Meisner and his band began to be noticed around Milwaukee after they appeared on the Fritz the Plumber Radio Show. They recorded their second record, "The 400 Polka and Waltzing in Vienna", in 1957 and followed it up with 1959's "Pretty Polly and Till I Return".

When Meisner's National Guard unit was called up in 1962, the band did not release a record until it came out with the LP album "A Polka and Waltz Holiday," on Cuca Records.

=== Halls of fame ===
Meisner was inducted into five halls of fame. Besides his 1989 induction into the International Polka Association Hall of Fame, he was inducted into the Cleveland Style Polka Hall of Fame and the Minnesota Polka Hall of Fame, and received the Wisconsin Polka Hall of Fame Lifetime Achievement Award. Meisner and his son, Steve Meisner, were the first polka artists to receive the Wisconsin Area Music Industry (WAMI) award in 1988.

== Personal life ==
Meisner was married to Judith Ann Kutz and the couple had three children (Steve, Daniel, and Michele Bush) before divorcing. His second wife, Shirley Tyson, died in the 1980s.

He suffered from alcoholism after spending so much time performing in bars, but he became sober in his 40s and alcohol-free for the final 20 years of his life.

== Death ==
He died from melanoma complications on June 10, 2005. He was living in Waukesha, Wisconsin at the time. In his death announcement in The New York Times, the newspaper said "Considered one of the titans of polka, Mr. Meisner was a bridge between the classics of the Lawrence Welk era and the pop-infused polkas of contemporary artists. To thousands of fans, he was second only to Frank Yankovic, the acknowledged king of polka."
