= International Polka Association =

- Formation: 1968
- Type: Non-profit music organization, hall of fame
- Headquarters: Chicago, Illinois
- Location: 4608 S Archer Avenue
- Website: ipapolkas.com

The International Polka Association (IPA) is located in Chicago, Illinois and dedicated to the study and preservation of polka music and the cultural heritage of Polish Americans who have made this music tradition part of their heritage. The IPA hosts an annual festival and convention as well as its Annual Polka Music Awards banquet. During the banquet, important figures in polka music are inducted into the Polka Hall of Fame.

== History ==
The concept of a national polka convention had been developed and pioneered in Chicago, and the first polka convention was held in 1963. This convention developed into the International Polka Convention which was presented each succeeding year in Chicago, Detroit and Buffalo, New York. In 1968, a steering committee began preparations for the formation of the International Polka Association. The association was officially chartered by the State of Illinois as a "not for profit" corporation and was registered with the County of Cook (Chicago) in August 1968.

As stated in its charter, the International Polka Association was organized as: "An educational and charitable organization for the preservation, promulgation and advancement of polka music and; to promote, maintain and advance public interest in polka entertainment; to advance the mutual interests and encourage greater cooperation among its members who are engaged in polka entertainment; and to encourage and pursue the study of polka music, dancing and traditional folklore".

The IPA is structured to serve as an educational resource. The IPA is also responsible for the continued operation and growth of its Polka Music Hall of Fame. It is through this branch that the association has been able to continue its historical, educational and research goals on behalf of polka music. The IPA Hall of Fame is located atop Polonia Banquets, a century-old dance hall at 4608 S. Archer Ave. in Chicago's Brighton Park neighborhood, and is open by appointment.

== Hall of Fame membership ==
Inductee	Year inducted	Notes	Ref
Adam Barthalt			
Billy Belina			
Michael "Mitch" Biskup			
William "Wesoly Bolek" Borek			
Roger Bright			
Bill Czupta			
John Demerski			
Ray Dorschner			
Chet Dragon			
Andy "Day" Dziagwa			
Joe Fedorchak			
Eddie Forman			
Walter Jagiello	1969	Inaugural class	
Frankie Yankovic	1969	Inaugural class	
Eddie Blazonczyk	1970		
Walter Dana	1971		
Eddie Zima	1972	Deceased	
Ray Budzilek	1973		
Marisha Data	1974		
Steve Adamczyk	1975		
Johnny Bomba	1980		
Happy Louie Dusseault	1982		
Joe Fiedor	1982	Deceased	
Lawrence Duchow	1983	Deceased	
Larry Chesky	1985		
Antonina Blazonczyk	1987	Deceased	
Kenny Bass	1989	Deceased	
Joe Czerniak	1989	Pioneer	
Myron Floren	1990		
John Check	1991	Pioneer	
Fred Bulinski	1992		
Bill Czerniak	1992		
Jerry Darlak	1997		
Kevin Adams	2014		
Gary Brueggen	2018		

Inductee	Year inducted
Fritsche, Fezz	1984 (Deceased)
Fuzzy, Cousin	1985 (Deceased)
Goetsch, Jerry
Gomulka, Lenny	1988
Gosz, Romy	1979 (Deceased)
Goydish, Bernie	1984
Grebnick, Al	1988 (Pioneer)
Groller, Walt	1986
Grybosh, Frankie "Gee"
Gulinski, Chet
Guzevich, Hank
Haas, Johnny	1988
Haller, Hank
Henry, Ray	1972
Herzog, Marv	1979
Hicks, Charlie
Hoyer, Matt	1987 (Deceased)
Hyzny, Johnny	1983
Hudy, Fred
Jarusinski, Raymond "Ray Jay"
Jasiewicz, Henry	1991 (Deceased)
Jasinski, Stan	1985 (Pioneer)
Johantgen, Vi
Karas, Johnny
Karas, Thomas
Kim, Alex
Korosa, Eddie
Kowalkowski, Chet	1991
Kozicki, Leon	1977
Kryger, Brunon	1977 (Deceased)
Kryger, Brunon (Bruce)	1990
Kryger, Lucian
Kucera, Ernie	1992 (Pioneer)
Lazarz, Joe	1977
Lesser, Adolph
Libera, Jackie
Libera, Johnny	1982
Liszka, Frank
Loeffelmacher, Harold	1975
Lucki, Don
Lush, Marion	1972
Lyskawa, Stanley
Madura, Mattie	1973 (Deceased)
Maduzia, Wally
Maksymowicz, Ted	1980 (Deceased)
Marggraff, Norman	1990
Marcissuk, Joe	1991
Matousek, Michael
Meisner, Verne	1989
Menko, Johnny	1987 (Pioneer)
Mikos, Bruno	1986
Miskulin, Joey
Mrozinski, Tom
Nowakowski, Michael
Nowicki, Adam
Oskierko, Eddie	1983 (Deceased)
Ostanek, Walter	1983
Paterek, "Joe Pat"	1978
Peachy, Don	2011
Pecon, Johnny	1975 (Deceased)
Pietrzak, Wanda "Koziol"
Podgorski, Ignacy	1978 (Deceased)
Polisky, Dennis
Piatkowski, Al
Pillar, Dick	1974
Pinter, Emily
Prohut, Lou	1981 (Deceased)
Przasnyski, Stanley
Przasnyski, John "Jas"	1998
Rhamy, Gary
Robak, Jan	1992 (Deceased)
Robel, Jolly Jack	1987 (Deceased)
Rock, Joe
Rodgers, Dick	1976
Rohwetter, Carl
Sajewski, Alvin C.	1978
Saleski, Stan E.	1980
Schafer, Chet	1976
Seretny, Virginia
Seweryniak, Dave "Scrubby"
Siebert, Gary
Siwiec, Eddie
Sewierski, Casey	1981
Skinger, Eddie
Sladky, Matt
Solek, Walt	1974
Soyka, Al	1979
Stolzenberg, Ray	1981
Stras, Keith
Struzik, Joe	1988 (Deceased)
Sturr, Jimmy	1984
Szczypula, Rev. Walter
Timmer, "Jolly" Joe	1990
Tokarz, Richie
Towalski, Li'l Richard
Trebar, Lou
Vadnal, Johnny	1987
Walk, Larry
Wasielewski, Matt
Watters, Pat	1986 (Deceased)
Weber, Jimmy
Welk, Lawrence	1994 (Deceased)
Wilczynski, Henry "Will"
Wilfahrt, "Whoopie John"	1976 (Deceased)
Wisniewski, Gene	1973
Witkowski, Bernie Wyte	1971
Wojkiewicz, Joe	1985
Wojnarowski, Frank	1970
Wolan, Sylvester "Shep"
Zablocki, Chester "Chet"
Zapolska, Teresa
Zavaski, Eddie
Zielinski, Bruno "Jr."	1986 (Pioneer)

== See also ==
- Polka Hall of Fame
- List of music organizations in the United States
