= Polka Hall of Fame =

Museum in Euclid, Ohio, United States

The National Cleveland-Style Polka Hall of Fame and Museum is a museum in Euclid, Ohio, United States. It traces the history of the Cleveland-style polka, from its Slovenian roots from the 19th century, through American factory and mining towns where it absorbed jazz and country expressions, to the post-war years when top ten polka hits got the nation on the dance floor.

== Awards show ==
The Polka Hall of Fame holds an annual awards show on the Saturday after Thanksgiving, during the three-day Thanksgiving Polka Weekend at the Holiday Inn Cleveland South in Independence, Ohio. The show awards local and national polka groups and talents.

== Hall of Fame Members ==
Inductee	'Year Inducted
Bass, Kenny
Bright, Roger
Dolgan, Cecilia
Fedorchak, Joe
Haller, Hank
Avsenik, Slavko
Hoyer, Matt
Hrovat, LynnMarie
Meisner, Verne
Miskulin, Joey
Ostanek, Walter
Pecon, Johnny
Trebar, Lou
Vadnal, Johnny
Władysław Daniłowski (Walter Dana)

== Location ==
The museum is located in the historic old city hall of Euclid, Ohio. The building was renovated in 2000.

== See also ==
- List of music museums
- International Polka Association
- Frankie Yankovic
- Verne Meisner
- Joey Miskulin
- Walter Ostanek
