= Frankie Yankovic =

Slovenian-American musician (1915-1998)

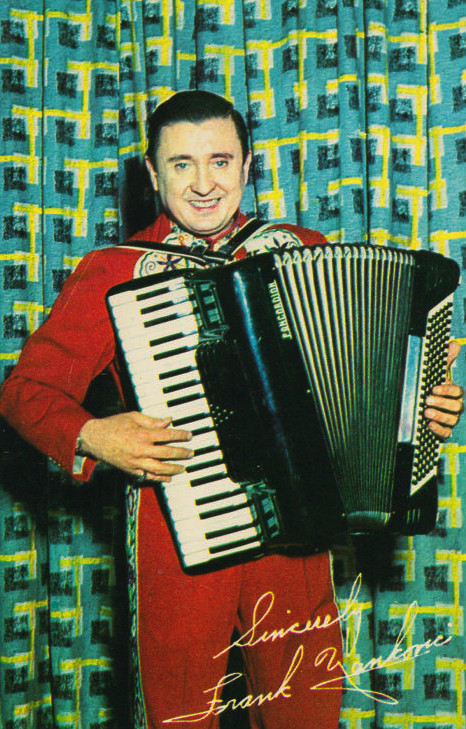
- Frankie Yankovic in 1958

Background information
- Born: Frank John Yankovic; July 28, 1915; Davis, West Virginia, U.S.
- Died: October 14, 1998 (aged 83) New Port Richey, Florida, U.S.
- Genre: Slovenian-style polka
- Instrument: Accordion

Frank John Yankovic (July 28, 1915 – October 14, 1998) was an American accordion player and polka musician. Known as "America's Polka King", Yankovic was considered the premier artist to play in the Slovenian style during his long career.

== Background ==
Yankovic was born in Davis, West Virginia, to Slovene immigrant parents: Andrew Yankovic (Andrej Jankovič, 1879–1949) from Kal and Rose T. Yankovic (née Terezija Mele, 1886–1968) from Cerknica, who married in 1910. Yankovic was raised in the Collinwood neighborhood on Cleveland's East Side. He recorded over 200 songs and sold over 30 million records in his career. In 1986, he was awarded the first-ever Grammy in the Best Polka Recording category. He rarely strayed from Slovenian-style polka, but did record with country guitarist Chet Atkins and pop singer Don Everly. He also recorded a version of the "Too Fat Polka" with comedian Drew Carey.

== History ==
Yankovic's father, a blacksmith, and his mother, a cook, met in a lumber camp in West Virginia where they both worked. When Yankovic was young, his father moved to Cleveland to escape authorities who learned of his bootlegging, and the rest of the family followed shortly thereafter. While living in Cleveland, he became enthralled by the brass bands that played at Slovenian social functions. His mother took on boarders to help with the family finances, including a man named Max Zelodec who performed Slovenian tunes on a button box. Yankovic acquired an accordion at age 9, and received a few lessons from Zelodec. By the late 1920s, in his early teenage years, he was a working musician, playing for community events. In the 1930s, he formed a business relationship with Joe Trolli and began making radio appearances on stations such as WJAY and WGAR. As his reputation spread, he sought opportunities to make records, but the major labels turned him down. His first records were made for the Yankee and Joliet labels operated by Fred Wolf, and the expenses were paid for by Yankovic himself.

In 1940, he married his first wife June, and they began to raise a family. However, the expenses of family life quickly overcame the incoming money from his music career, so he opened a tavern, calling it the Yankovic Bar. It became a popular hangout for local musicians, and he continued to run it until he sold it in 1948, dedicating himself to the accordion.

Yankovic enlisted in the armed forces in 1943 and cut numerous records while on leave, prior to his departure for Europe. Yankovic was assigned duty in 1943 in the infantry as a flame-thrower operator. He fought in the Battle of the Bulge where a severe case of frostbite nearly required the amputation of his hands and feet. Fortunately, he was able to beat the resulting gangrene before that became necessary, and was awarded a Purple Heart. The doctors urged him to have his fingers amputated, but he refused, as that would have ended his music career. After getting out of the hospital, he and four other musicians were assigned to special services to entertain the troops, including General George Patton and his Third United States Army.

Yankovic hit the national scene when he earned two platinum singles for "Just Because" (1947) and "Blue Skirt Waltz" (1949). Others who recorded the Blue Skirt Waltz were the Tunemixers and Guy Lombardo both in 1949, Lawrence Welk (Myron Floren) in 1958, Jim Ed Brown and the Browns in 1960, Hank Thompson in 1962, and Bobby Vinton in 1976. Yankovic found a Bohemian Waltz called "Cervenou Sukynku," (written by Vaclav Blaha) or loosely translated, "Red Skirt Waltz." Yankovic asked Mitchell Parrish ("Stardust", "Sleighride") to write new lyrics to the melody. Parrish changed "red" to "blue". Yankovic sold over 2.5 million records and with the Tunemixers version and Guy Lombardo's version, it sold over 4 million records total in 1949. It was the second Cleveland-style song to sell over one million recordings.

Columbia Records initially refused to record "Just Because", because other versions of the song had been around for years without much success; only allowing it when Yankovic said that he would buy the first 10,000 records. Yankovic obtained the title of America's Polka King after beating Louis Bashell, Romy Gosz, Harold Loeffelmacher and the Six Fat Dutchmen, Whoopee John Wilfahrt, and Lawrence Duchow in a battle of the bands in Milwaukee at the Milwaukee Arena on June 9, 1948.

In 1950, he made his Hollywood debut and collaborated with Doris Day as a singer.

In 1970, a house fire destroyed the gold records for "Just Because" and "Blue Skirt Waltz".

Yankovic also hosted the television series Polka Time for Buffalo, New York-based WKBW-TV for 26 weeks in 1962. He commuted from Cleveland to host each episode, which aired live. He also hosted a similar show at WGN-TV Chicago at about the same time.

He won a Grammy Award in 1986 for his album 70 Years of Hits, the first winner in the category Best Polka Album.

Musical comedian "Weird Al" Yankovic, no relation, has jokingly suggested that he was given accordion lessons as a child because his parents thought "there should be at least one more accordion-playing Yankovic in the world." Frankie featured Weird Al on "Who Stole the Kishka?" from his 1996 album Songs of the Polka King, Volume 1. Weird Al used a portion of Frankie's "The Tick Tock Polka" in the song "Polka Face" from the 2011 album Alpocalypse, as part of a parody take on "Tik Tok" by Ke$ha.

== Death ==
Yankovic died on October 14, 1998, in New Port Richey, Florida, from heart failure, at the age of 83. He is buried in Cleveland's Calvary Cemetery. Hundreds of friends, family, his loyal fans and fellow musicians attended his memorial service. At his peak, Yankovic traveled extensively and performed 325 shows a year. He sold 30 million records during his lifetime.

== Honors ==
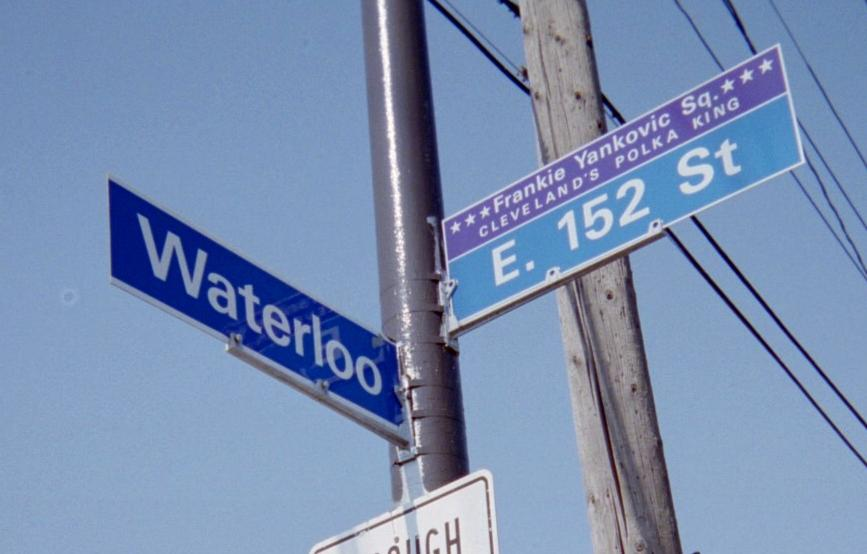
Intersection signpost

Frankie Yankovic visited Cerknica, the hometown of his parents, in 1952 or 1953 and again in 1995. On the second occasion, a special reception was organized in his honor in Rakov Škocjan. He was presented with a commemorative certificate in recognition of his significant contributions to promoting Slovene culture worldwide. Additionally, he received an oil painting by the academic painter Tomaž Perko to remember his time in Cerknica.

In Bob Dolgan's 2006 biography of Yankovic, Frankie's longtime drummer Dave Wolnik observed that "Yankovic didn't have a street named for him in his own hometown". This launched a campaign by the National Cleveland-Style Polka Hall of Fame and Museum and City Councilman Michael Polensek, and in a ceremony on August 21, 2007, the square at the intersection of Waterloo Rd. and East 152nd St. in Cleveland (41.569°N 81.5752°W), not far from where Yankovic grew up, was named in his honor.

== Former band members ==
- Marian "Lefty" Bell - played bass with Yankovic.
- Henry "Hank The Yank" Bokal - Drummer with the original "Frankie Yankovic and His Yanks" from 1941 through 1949.
- Denny Boneck (Milwaukee, Wisconsin), stand-up bass and back-up vocals. Played, toured and recorded with Frank as one of the "Yanks" from 1970 to 1981.
- Roger Bright - Accordion player from New Glarus, Wisconsin, recorded 10 albums with Yankovic.
- Georgie Cook - Banjo player, who helped Yankovic establish the "Cleveland Sound".
- Anthony "Tops" Cardone was a member of the popular Yankovic Show band that toured in the early 1950s, playing in Hollywood, Las Vegas, and top nightclubs in the United States. Tops played second accordion with Frank's band.
- Joseph A. Godec - upright bass, toured with Yankovic from 1940 to 1944 and 1951.
- Frank Godec - guitar, toured with Yankovic from 1940 to 1944 and 1951.
- Steve Kucenski - played 2nd accordion in the late 70s to early 90s.
- Joey Miskulin - Began playing with Yankovic in 1962 at the age of 13. This was the start of a relationship that lasted for the next 35 years. Joey developed his skill with the accordion and music while touring with the band. Joey began writing and arranging songs for Yankovic, eventually arranging and producing some of Yankovic's albums, including the Grammy Award-winning album "70 Years of Hits".
- Johnny Pecon - Button Box and Piano Accordion with the original "Frankie Yankovic and His Yanks" from 1946 through 1949.
- Adolph "Church" Srnick - long time bass player with Yankovic. Played the stand up 3/4 bass and also the "baby" electric bass from 1945 until his death in 1968.
- Eddie "Teener" - played banjo with Yankovic off and on from 1953 until his death in 1970. Co-wrote with Yankovic on "Happy Polka", which was originally written as a commercial for a TV show.
- Rod Verette - played bass on Yankovic's west coast tour in late '80s.
- Jeff Winard - Accomplished accordionist from Milwaukee; traveled with Yankovic in later years.

== See also ==
- Slovene Americans
