= KTWN =

KTWN may refer to:

- KTWN-LD, a defunct low-power television station (channel 18) formerly licensed to serve Little Rock, Arkansas, United States
- KMWA, a radio station (96.3 FM) licensed to serve Edina, Minnesota, United States, which held the call sign KTWN-FM from 2012 to 2017
- KGLB, a radio station (1310 AM) licensed to serve Glencoe, Minnesota, which held the call sign KTWN from 2011 to 2012
- KQQL, a radio station (107.9 FM) licensed to serve Anoka, Minnesota, which held the call sign KTWN-FM from 1968 to 1983
