= Babe Wagner =

American musician and bandleader (1893–1961)

- Born: Ellsworth Wagner; June 1, 1914 near New Ulm, Minnesota, US
- Died: September 16, 1949 (aged 35)
- Genres: Polka, Big band
- Instrument: Trombone
- Labels: Columbia Records

Ellsworth "Babe" Wagner (June 1, 1914 – September 16, 1949) was a German-American musician and bandleader, whose work spanned a large spectrum, from Big band to ethnic and polka music. He was inducted into both the Minnesota Music Hall of Fame in 1992 and the International Polka Association's Hall of Fame in 2020 (Pioneer category).

== Life and early career ==
Wagner was born in Essig, Minnesota outside of New Ulm to Edward Wagner and his wife, both accomplished musicians. The family moved to New Ulm, where Wagner received musical education throughout his childhood, and, by the age of 17, he was performing professionally with Whoopee John. He later travelled with the Henry Halstead orchestra and was discovered and invited to join Gene Krupa in 1939. He toured with Krupa and was on many of the band's recordings on Okeh Records.

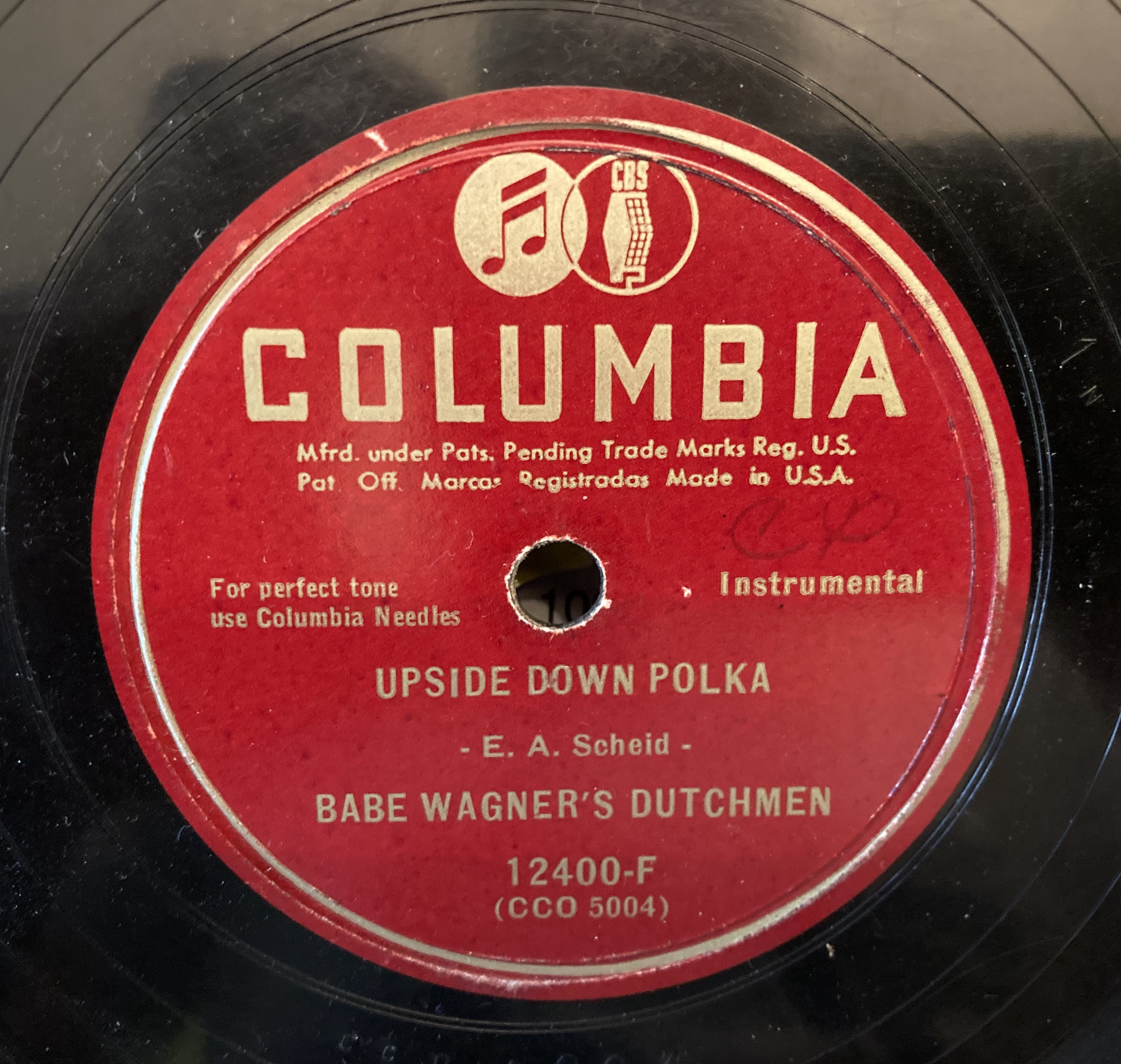
The Upside Down polka recorded by Babe Wagner's Dutchmen

== Later career and recordings ==
After the War, Wagner formed his own orchestra, Babe Wagner's Dutchmen, and started recording with Columbia Records, which was expanding its musical portfolio (see example in figure at right). Critics generally reviewed Wagner's recordings favorably, for example describing his style as "infectious for dancing". Some of his Columbia 78 RPM recordings were later re-issued in the 1950s in LP format by Liberty Music Shop Records. Many of his recordings with both Gene Krupa and his own band are available through the Internet Archive.

== Death ==
His musical career with the Dutchmen was short-lived, as he died in 1949 at the age of 35 years. His eponymous band continued to perform into the early 1960s.
