= Gruenenfelder =

Gruenenfelder is a rare last name that originated from the village Grünenfeld in the Kanton of St Gallen in the east of Switzerland. Though the vast majority of people with the name reside in Germany or Switzerland, there are some members of the Gruenenfelder family that live in other countries, primarily in the United States. According to family legend the family were originally Freiherren Arth von Grünenfeld and later assumed the surname Grünenfelder.

== People with the "Gruenenfelder" surname ==
- Alex Gruenenfelder, American filmmaker and author
- Andi Grünenfelder, Swiss cross-country skier
- Boniface Gruenenfelder, Swiss-born American professor of music, composer and band conductor; inducted 1989 into the Minnesota Music Hall of Fame
- Corina Grünenfelder, Swiss former alpine skier who competed in the 2002 Winter Olympics
- Jürg Grünenfelder, Swiss alpine skier
- Kim Gruenenfelder, American author
- Logan Gruenenfelder, American educator
- Robert Gruenenfelder, American jazz musician of radio and television and grandson of Boniface (above); inducted 1990 into the Minnesota Music Hall of Fame
- Tobias Grünenfelder, Swiss alpine skier
