= KGLB =

Coordinates: 44°46′41″N 94°07′40″W

- Glencoe, Minnesota; United States
- Frequency: 1310 kHz
- Branding: Classic Hit Country 1310 KGLB

Programming
- Format: Classic country

Ownership
- Owner: Tor Ingstad; (Iowa City Broadcasting Company, Inc.)

History
- First air date: 1984 (as KRBI)
- Former call signs: KRBI (1984–2008); KGLB (2008–2011); KTWN (2011–2012)

Technical information
- Licensing authority: FCC
- Facility ID: 31874
- Class: B
- Power: 2,500 watts (day); 270 watts (night)
- Translator: 96.1 K241DE (Glencoe)

Links
- Public license information: Public file; LMS
- Webcast: Listen live
- Website: www.kduz.com

KGLB (1310 AM) is a radio station licensed to Glencoe, Minnesota. The station, which previously aired an oldies format based in St. Peter, Minnesota, returned to the air on July 15, 2009, with a Classic Country format. The station had been off the air for about a year.

== History ==
The station first signed on the air in 1984 with the call sign KRBI and was originally licensed to the nearby community of St. Peter, Minnesota. For much of its early history, it was owned by Three Eagles Communications as part of its cluster of stations serving the Mankato/St. Peter metropolitan area.

Those stations included KEEZ, KYSM-FM, KRBI-FM, and KMKO-FM in the Mankato/St. Peter/New Ulm metropolitan area. The station became KGLB on November 1, 2008, renamed to KTWN on August 1, 2011, and returned to the KGLB call sign on December 6, 2012.

KRBI 1310 was sold to Northern Lights Broadcasting during the summer of 2008. Northern Lights allowed the station to go dark on the date the sale became official. Northern Lights, the owner of then rhythmic-formatted B96 (KTTB), had filed an application to move B96 from Glencoe to Edina to improve the station's coverage over the Twin Cities metropolitan area. Northern Lights moved KGLB from St. Peter to Glencoe with a power of 2,500 days and 270 watts nights, in order to maintain "local service" to Glencoe.

Northern Lights sold the station to Tor Ingstad and licensee Iowa City Broadcasting Company, Inc. for $195,000; the transaction was consummated on July 10, 2013. This move was undertaken to maintain a local service outlet in Glencoe, which had no other licensed radio stations, as Northern Lights was moving a separate FM station out of the area.

KGLB often simulcasts or shares programming with its sister stations, KDUZ (1260 AM) and KARP-FM (106.9 FM).

KGLB features a specific, long-running local program called "Norwood Young America Talk." The show, which has been co-hosted by General Manager Jeremy Stender, has broadcast over 800 episodes since 2010 and focuses on the nearby community of Norwood Young America.

The station a regional affiliate for professional sports, carrying Minnesota Vikings Football and Minnesota Twins Baseball play-by-play coverage.
