= KRBI =

KRBI may refer to:

- KRBI-FM, a radio station (105.5 FM) licensed to St. Peter, Minnesota, United States
- KGLB, a radio station (1310 AM) licensed to St. Peter, Minnesota, United States, which held the call sign KRBI until November 2008
