= Wally Pikal =

Wally Pikal (February 15, 1927 – March 2, 2017) was an American musician and entertainer who is included in the Minnesota Music Hall of Fame. He was famous for his ability to play multiple trumpets simultaneously while jumping on a pogo stick.

== Life and career ==
Pikal was born in Brownton, Minnesota in 1927.

While a senior in high school, Wally played his first professional job with the Jerry Dostal Band. Wally soon learned that he could play two and even three trumpets at the same time. That was strange enough, but Wally began doing it while jumping on a pogo stick, to the total amazement of his audiences. In 1950 he formed the band "Wally & the Dill Pickles". Wally continued playing for over half a century. He also owned a music store in Hutchinson, Minnesota. Wally's one-man vaudeville show earned him fame on national television shows. In an appearance on The Tonight Show (host Joey Bishop was filling in for Johnny Carson) in 1973, Wally played three trumpets while jumping on his pogo stick, to which Bishop said, "Son of a gun!". Wally also appeared on The Mike Douglas Show around the same time.

Wally had a weekly Friday radio show called "The Pikal Patch" on KDUZ in Hutchinson and entertained audiences with his old-time band. While still playing two trumpets at once, Wally stopped using the pogo stick. Over the years, Wally worked with a who's who of entertainers, including Doc Severinsen, Jim Stafford, Victor Borge, Conway Twitty, and Frank Sinatra Jr.

He died at home in Litchfield, Minnesota in 2017 aged 90.
