= Earl Schmidt =

American musician

- Born: November 27, 1929; Cologne or Benton Township, Carver County, Minnesota
- Died: December 11, 2008 (aged 79) Waconia, Minnesota
- Genres: Polka
- Spouse: Marville Herrmann (m. 1956)

Earl Schmidt (November 27, 1929 – December 11, 2008) was an American polka musician from the state of Minnesota. He was inducted into the Minnesota Music Hall of Fame in 2004.

== Early life ==
Schmidt was born on November 27, 1929, to Phillip and Emma Schmidt on a dairy farm in Cologne or Benton Township, Carver County, Minnesota.

== Career ==
Schmidt began his musical career playing trombone in his high school band at Norwood Young America. He organized a little German Band, playing at school functions and other engagements in the area. The same year, he played his first professional job with Ivan Kahle.

While in the Marine Corps, he was accepted into the United States Marine Band in San Diego and marched in two Rose Parades. In 1960, Schmidt and Jerry Schuft organized the Earl Schmidt Orchestra featuring Jerry Schuft and played ballrooms, on radio and TV, and on tours. In 2003, Earl and Marville were recognized as Volunteers of the Year by the Minnesota Music Hall of Fame. They had worked as emcees for concertina jamborees annually in Gibbon since 1973.

== Personal life ==
Schmidt also enjoyed word games and crossword puzzles and was a contestant on two game shows: Scrabble and Wheel of Fortune.

=== Death ===
He died on December 11, 2008, at Ridgeview Medical Center in Waconia, Minnesota.
