= Handmaids of the Heart of Jesus =

Roman Catholic religious congregation

- Abbreviation: ACJ
- Founder: Mother Mary Clare Roufs
- Type: Public Association of the Lay Faithful
- Headquarters: New Ulm, Minnesota
- Members: 40+
- Website: Handmaids of the Heart of Jesus

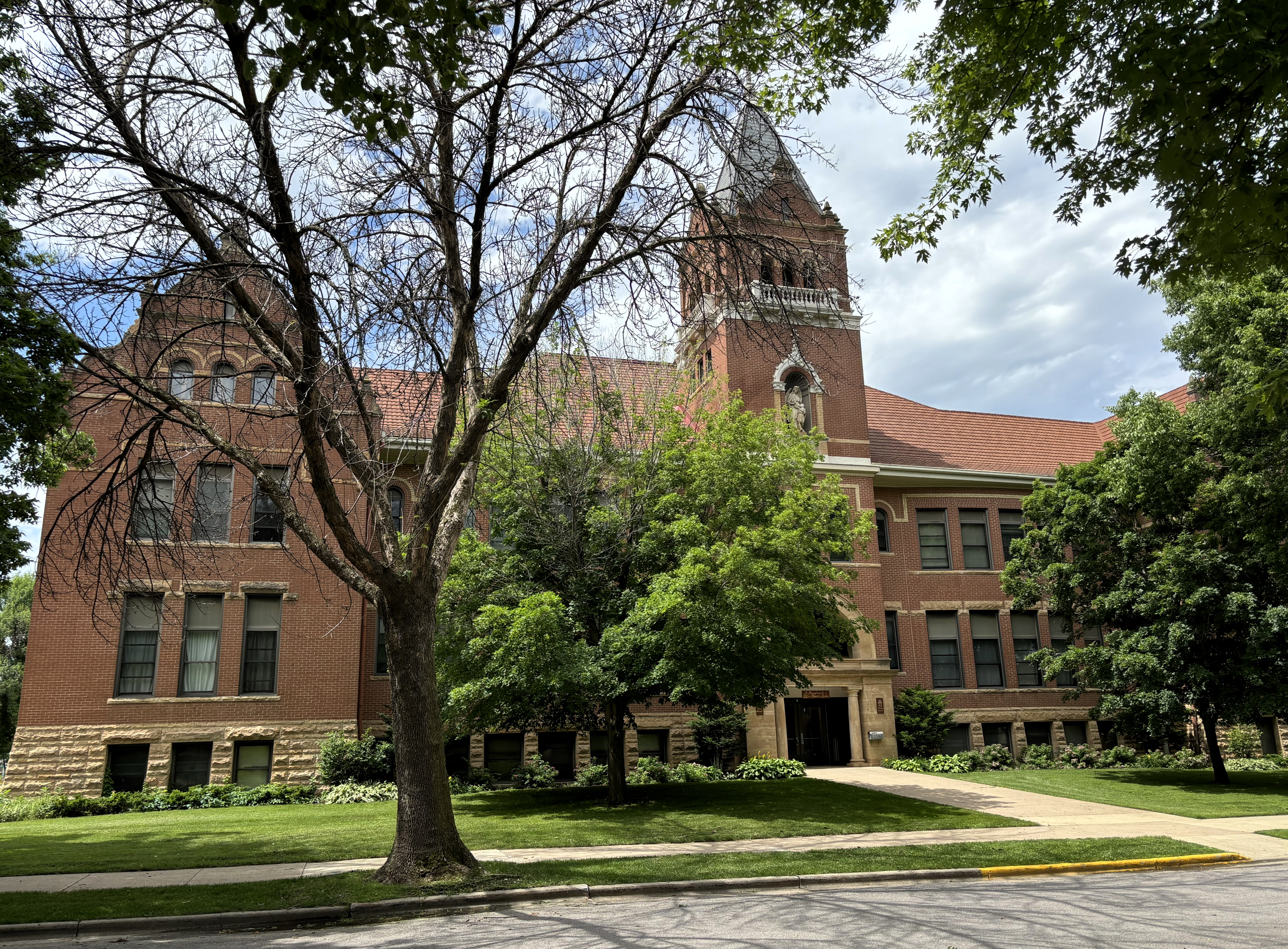
Holy Trinity Convent, New Ulm

The Handmaids of the Heart of Jesus, a community of Catholic religious sisters, was founded in 2007. In 2010, the Handmaids became an Association of the Christian faithful, based in New Ulm, Minnesota, with the goal of becoming a diocesan religious institute.

The community was founded by Sr. Mary Clare Roufs, a graduate of University of St. Thomas. The community only accepts applicants who are younger than 35. Sisters live in community and wear a religious habit. They often teach in Catholic schools, as well as participating in community life as aspiring religious. Their daily schedule of prayer includes two hours of Eucharistic Adoration, Mass, and the Liturgy of the Hours.

In addition to the mother house in New Ulm, the association has communities in Duluth, Saint Paul, Dickinson, North Dakota, and a Milwaukee, Wisconsin location opening in Fall 2027. As of 2026, there were more than 40 sisters.
