= Bavarian Blast =

Annual summer polka festival

Coordinates: 44°19′30″N 94°28′35″W

Bavarian Blast is the summer festival held every year in New Ulm, Minnesota, United States. The festival features numerous bands, activities and attractions. Due to its growth in popularity over the years, the location was moved from the downtown area (mainly German Park) to the local fair grounds. The weekend event includes local bands, Tubamania, 10K Race, and a parade. The festival is held mid-July.

The COVID-19 pandemic in 2020 forced officials to cancel the Blast & defer to 2021.

== Origin ==
While Bavarian Blast is young, its true past goes back to polkas. New Ulm was once referred to as the "polka capital of the world" and so a summer festival called Polka Days evolved (1953). Within a few years the festival grew to thousands of loyal fans. In the 1980s the festival, whose focal point was an outdoor stage playing polkas til the early hours, reached 80,000. The festival grew too big and great for the city which caused New Ulm to end the festival in 1971.

Soon the tradition of a summer festival continued with Heritagefest. Held at the fairgrounds, this festival was a big event for locals. The festival included a yearly drama about Hermann (local monument) called Hermannstraum. The festival faced financial difficulties, forcing it to end.

== Attendance ==
The event is a big deal for the city, in 2008 it was reported by a document from the New Ulm Chamber of Commerce that the event had an attendance estimate equal to that of the two-weekend Oktoberfest festival the city holds (6,000 attendees).

== Narren ==
A group of New Ulm citizens started a group called the "Narren." The group is based on German tradition. The members dress up in fun costumes they assemble and then put on handcarved masks which they import from Germany. While unusual, this group brings great cheer to the event. They always lead the dancing at the festival when the local municipal men's choir (the Concord Singers) performs.

== Heinzelmännchen gnomes ==
A group of New Ulm Goosetown resident family that comes out to the festival to have a good time with the children and the young at heart. They love to dance and have a good time. Be sure to have your cameras, because they are always willing to stop and pose for a picture. The family includes Hans and his wife Carola, their energetic son Johanne, and their shy little daughter Angelika. Gertie the Goose is also often spotted with the family along with the three moral mushrooms, Max, Morrit, and Meta. It is said that to see a gnome would bring you good luck for the year to come.

== Run and walk ==
Every year there is a race held in connection with the Bavarian Blast. The race starts off downtown and utilizes New Ulm's 7 miles of bike paths. The run/walk has gained popularity, especial with New Ulm's "Heart of New Ulm" project. The 2009 race was won by a local who wore nothing but flaming orange shorts and his shoes.
