= KNOF =

Coordinates: 44°58′33.9″N 93°16′20.8″W

- St. Paul, Minnesota; United States
- Broadcast area: Minneapolis-St. Paul
- Frequency: 95.3 MHz
- Branding: PraiseLive

Programming
- Language: English
- Format: Contemporary Christian Music

Ownership
- Owner: Christian Heritage Broadcasting, Inc.

History
- First air date: April 10, 1960
- Former call signs: KNOF (1960–2016); KZGO (2016–2021)

Technical information
- Licensing authority: FCC
- Facility ID: 59624
- Class: A
- ERP: 900 watts (horizontal polarization); 820 watts (vertical)
- HAAT: 258 m (846 ft)

Links
- Public license information: Public file; LMS
- Webcast: Listen Live
- Website: PraiseLive.org

KNOF (95.3 MHz) is a non-profit FM radio station licensed to St. Paul, Minnesota, and serving the Twin Cities area. The station is broadcasts a Christian Contemporary radio format and is owned by Christian Heritage Broadcasting, Inc. KNOF's radio studios and offices are on Elliot Avenue in Minneapolis.

KNOF has an effective radiated power (ERP) of 900 watts (horizontal polarization) and 820 watts (vertical). The transmitter is located atop the IDS Center.

== History ==
KNOF was founded by the Rev. Fred and the Rev. Grace Adam, signing on the air on April 10, 1960, to broadcast Christian programming to the greater Twin Cities media market of Minneapolis/St. Paul. Their company was named the Selby Gospel Broadcasting Corporation because the offices and studios were on Selby Avenue in St. Paul. The station's transmitter transmitted only 3,000 watts on a 249-foot tower, while many local FM stations were powered at 100,000 watts on towers five times that height.

In August 2007, the Federal Communications Commission (FCC) approved the transfer of control of Selby Gospel Broadcasting to North Central University, as a gift to the college at the request of Rev. Grace Adam, an alumna of the university.

The station operated from new state of the art studios on the campus of North Central University and transmitted a 6,000-watt signal from a 249-foot tower in St. Paul, its city of license.

=== New ownership ===
KNOF was sold to Praise Broadcasting (who began operating the station via a time brokerage agreement in 2009) effective October 17, 2014 for $5 million, and shifted to a contemporary Christian music format as "Praise FM". However, nearly eleven months later, on September 24, 2015, Praise Broadcasting announced the sale of KNOF to Northern Lights Broadcasting, in exchange for money, the move of the format to the HD2 sub channel of Northern Lights' KTWN, and a five-year sponsorship deal with the Minnesota Twins for "Faith Night" from 2016 to 2020 and use of Target Field for Praise FM's annual concerts in 2016 and 2017. In total, the transaction was valued at $7.95 million, and was consummated on January 4, 2016.

Speculation from media outlets had Northern Lights moving KTWN and its Alternative format to 95.3, paving the way for a new format to debut at 96.3. These rumors increased as Northern Lights requested the callsign KZGO for the station.

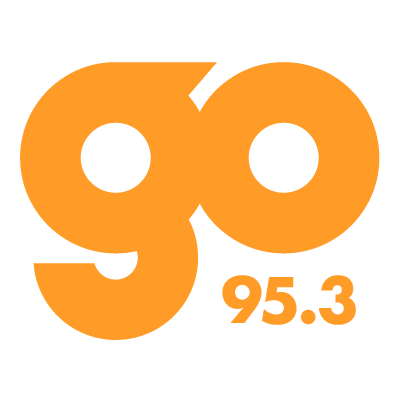
"Go" logo (2016–2021)

On January 5, 2016, at 3 p.m., Northern Lights flipped the station to Rhythmic Top 40 as "Go 95.3", launching with "Crewed Up" by local hip hop group Atmosphere, the first of 10,000 songs in a row to launch the new station. The move brought the format back to the Twin Cities for the first time since sister station KTWN (as KTTB) flipped to Top 40 in 2010. The newly launched "Go 95.3" featured a hybrid presentation of current R&B/Hip-Hop product mixed in with music from local and independent talent. The format was launched exactly one year to the minute that KTWN launched the "Go 96.3" alternative format. On January 22, 2016, KNOF changed its call sign to KZGO.

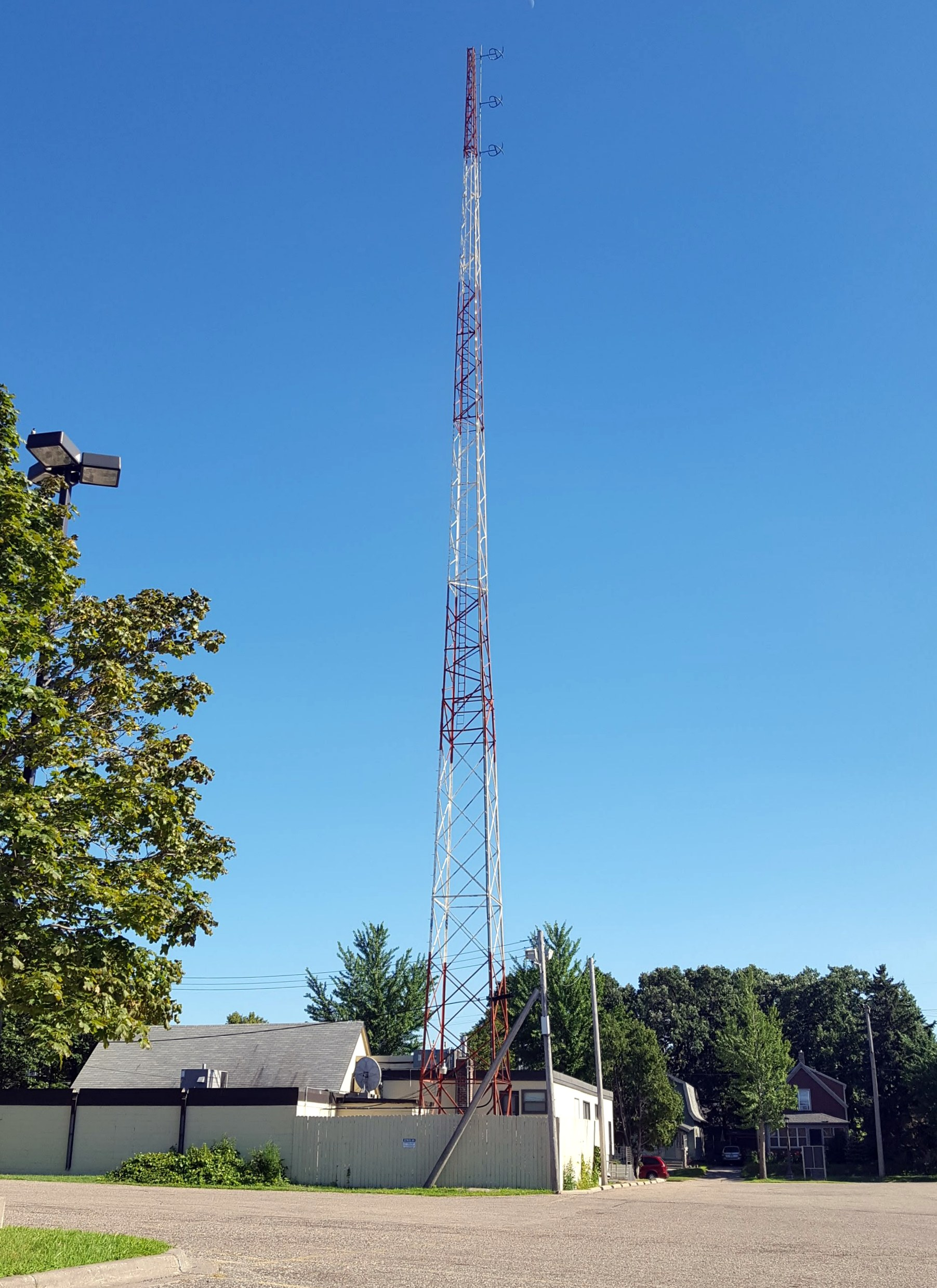
The former radio tower for KNOF 95.3 FM St. Paul, MN with studios below.

On December 1, 2020, Go Media announced that they would sell KQGO (the former KTWN) and KZGO to the Educational Media Foundation for $2.45 million. With the announcement of the sale, the stations immediately dismissed all on-air staff and shifted to a jockless presentation, which it continued with until the sale closed. The FCC officially approved the sale on March 26, 2021, and was officially consummated on April 12. On the same day as the sale consummation, the former contemporary worship music "Praise FM" format (now under the name "PraiseLive") that aired on the station prior to the sale to Northern Lights/Go Media in 2016 returned to the station, as part of an agreement with Praise Broadcasting and EMF. Along with the change, KZGO changed back to the heritage KNOF call letters. Just days later, on April 23, Praise Broadcasting announced it would buy the station outright from EMF for $1.225 million. The sale was closed on July 20, 2021.
