= Joseph Hofmeister =

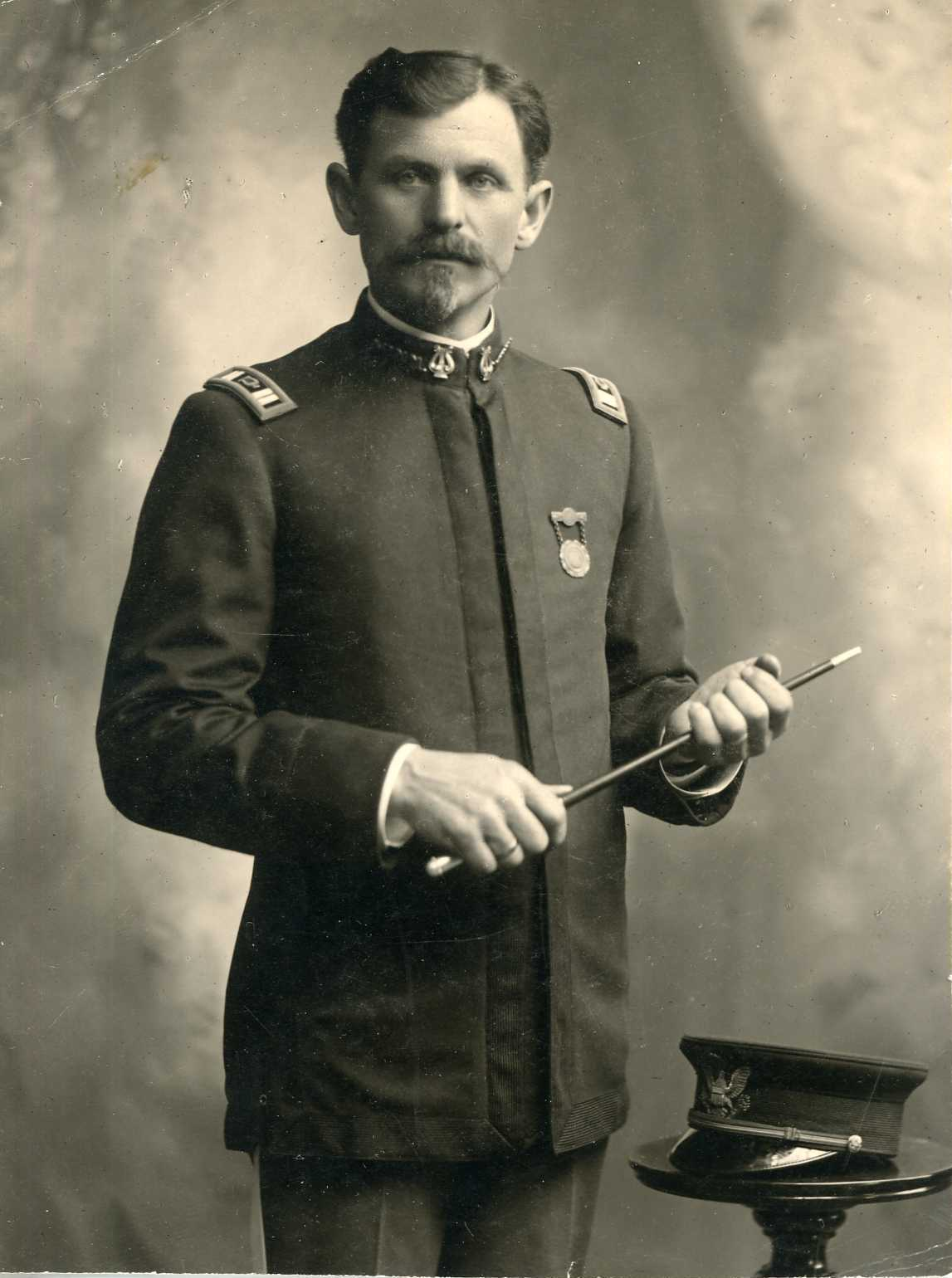
- Hofmeister in c. 1910

Background information
- Born: March 29, 1867 near Cheb, Bohemia, Austrian Empire
- Died: October 1, 1933 (aged 66) Springfield, Minnesota, US
- Genres: Polka
- Occupations: Bandleader, composer and music teacher

Joseph C. Hofmeister (March 29, 1867 – October 1, 1933) was a Czech American bandleader, composer and music educator. An immigrant from Bohemia, he was based in southern Minnesota. He was best known as the longtime director of the Second Regiment Band of the Minnesota National Guard and as the patriarch of the Hofmeister musical family, who were later inducted into the Minnesota Music Hall of Fame in 1994.

== Early life and immigration ==
Joseph C. Hofmeister was born on March 29, 1867, near the town of Cheb, Bohemia (modern-day Czech Republic), to Ignatz Hofmeister and Maria Keim. He studied music in his homeland for three years before immigrating to the United States in 1881 at the age of fourteen. Hofmeister settled in New Ulm, Minnesota, where he worked on local farms while continuing his musical training.

== Career ==
Hofmeister became one of the most prominent musicians in southern Minnesota during the late 19th and early 20th centuries. He directed several ensembles, including the Second Regiment Band of the Minnesota National Guard, which earned distinction from the regiment's headquarters during the Mexican Border Expedition of 1916–1917.

He also led the Hofmeister Band in New Ulm and later directed the Springfield Orpheus Band beginning in 1923. Hofmeister was recognized as a skilled composer and arranger, writing numerous works for concert orchestra, military band, and vocal performance. His most famous composition was the "Minnesota Centennial March".

== Legacy ==
Joseph Hofmeister's leadership and instruction has left a lasting impact on many Minnesota musicians. His family was recognized collectively for their musical contributions when the Hofmeister Family was inducted into the Minnesota Music Hall of Fame in 1994. Hofmeister died on October 1, 1933, in Springfield, Minnesota, at the age of 66. He was buried in New Ulm Catholic cemetery.
