= KMWA =

Air1 radio station in Edina, Minnesota

- Edina, Minnesota; United States
- Broadcast area: Minneapolis–Saint Paul
- Frequency: 96.3 MHz (HD Radio)

Programming
- Language: English
- Format: Christian worship music
- Subchannels: HD2: Christian pop/hip hop "Boost 92.9"; HD3: K-Love Eras
- Network: Air1

Ownership
- Owner: Educational Media Foundation

History
- First air date: August 1993
- Former call signs: KQXA (CP; 1991–1993); KARP (1993–2000); KTTB (2000–2010); KHTC (2010–2012); KTWN-FM (2012–2017); KQGO (2017–2021)

Technical information
- Licensing authority: FCC
- Facility ID: 70705
- Class: C3
- Power: 19,000 watts
- HAAT: 77 m (253 ft)
- Transmitter coordinates: 45°1′24.0″N 93°22′53.0″W
- Translator: HD2: 92.9 W225AP (Saint Paul)

Links
- Public license information: Public file; LMS
- Webcast: Listen Live
- Website: air1.com

KMWA (96.3 FM; "Air1") is a non-commercial FM radio station licensed to Edina, Minnesota, and serving the Twin Cities area. The station is owned by the Educational Media Foundation, and airs programming from EMF's nationally syndicated "Air1" radio format featuring Christian Worship Music. KMWA's transmitter is located in New Hope.

== History ==
=== Origins ===
The frequency was originally licensed as KQXA by the Federal Communications Commission (FCC) on August 15, 1991. In August 1993, the station signed on as KARP, playing a wide mix of classic rock, oldies, country music and farm reports. The station's transmitter was initially located west of Le Sueur.

To increase the value of the station, KARP's owners decided to seek FCC permission to increase power and move their transmitter closer to the Minneapolis-St. Paul metro area. The transmitter was moved farther north and east to a location south of Hutchinson, and power was increased from 50,000 watts to 100,000 watts, giving the station a city-grade signal over much of the west metro area. The move also resulted in WJMC-FM (96.3) in Rice Lake, Wisconsin downgrading from 100 kW to 50 kW, changing its frequency to 96.1 FM, and moving its transmitter north. The actions were approved by the FCC in September 1999.

=== B96 (2000–2010) ===
In February 2000, KARP was purchased by a group consisting of local investors Kandu Communications and Cincinnati, Ohio-based Blue Chip Broadcasting, with the aim of bringing a full-power quasi-urban-formatted music FM station to Minnesota for the first time. The station moved its transmitter to a new site near Watertown later that month. The transfer in ownership to Blue Chip Broadcasting took place just after noon on May 18, 2000. The station played all requests during the morning hours, with goodbyes from the DJs and other staff. Morning hosts John Carrigan and John Mons gave a final farewell, followed by "Happy Trails." They also announced that the KARP call sign and format would be moving to KKJR (106.9 FM) in Hutchinson, on June 1. Following KARP's departure from 96.3 FM, the station began stunting, repeating a short list of songs from Twin Cities artists Prince, Morris Day, The Time, and Alexander O'Neal.

The new "B96" (KTTB) debuted at 6 p.m. on May 31, 2000, with Da Brat's "What'chu Like" being the first song played. In May 2001, Blue Chip sold the station to Radio One, a company that specializes in urban formats. However, Radio One allowed KTTB to maintain its rhythmic-formatted playlist (although the station leaned towards urban and played some urban exclusive songs that most rhythmic stations normally didn't play).

==== Off to the "Northern Lights" ====
On June 14, 2007, Northern Lights Broadcasting, owned by the family of Minnesota Twins owner Carl Pohlad, announced the purchase of KTTB from Radio One for US$28 million. The deal was approved by the FCC on August 20, 2007. Northern Lights had already stated that it would keep the station's staff and format intact.

In September 2008, Northern Lights Broadcasting filed an application to change KTTB's city of license from Glencoe to Edina (the city in which the station's studios were located), move its transmitter to the tower in St. Louis Park used by AM stations WWTC and KYCR, and decrease its power (from 100,000 to 24,000 watts) and antenna height. Northern Lights purchased 1310 AM KRBI in St. Peter in late July, and changed its call sign to KGLB. It plans to change KGLB's city of license to Glencoe (which has no other radio stations licensed to it) to maintain local service to Glencoe. The deal was not approved, but Northern Lights' application to change KTTB's city of license to Edina, move the transmitter to New Hope, and decrease its power (from 100,000 to 19,000 watts) was approved, and KTTB began transmitting from New Hope on August 20, 2009.

The move strengthened KTTB's signal in urbanized portions of the Minneapolis-St. Paul metropolitan area. The lower power, however, meant the station lost coverage in the nearby smaller markets of Mankato and St. Cloud, where it also had significant listenership.

=== 96.3 Now (2010–2012) ===
At Noon on January 6, 2010, Northern Lights rebranded the station as "96.3 Now" and changed call letters to KHTC, officially dropping the urban lean at the station, while retaining the rhythmic format. The final song on "B96" was "Say My Name" by Destiny's Child, while the first song on "Now" was Miley Cyrus' "Party in the U.S.A.". The move put KHTC in an even closer rivalry to mainstream Top 40 (CHR) station KDWB-FM. According to radio promos, the station also featured Commercial-Free Mondays. While they were moving closer towards KDWB's format, KHTC's Program Director Sam Elliott insisted that "96.3 Now" would continue to have a Rhythmic flavor, will be more "Dance-oriented" than KDWB, will not play any songs that are too "Disney Pop", and will not add any pop/rock artists (like Nickelback). KHTC remained a reporter in Nielsen BDS' Rhythmic Airplay Panel as well as on Mediabase's Rhythmic Chart because of its rhythmic direction and playlist, "KHTC 96.3 Edina Minneapolis, MN 10 August 2011".and therefore did not meet the criteria to be included on their mainstream Top 40/CHR reporting panels.

=== 96.3 K-Twin (2012–2014) ===
On December 29, 2011, Northern Lights announced that KHTC would drop the rhythmic format and "Now" branding on January 1, 2012, and shift to a modern adult contemporary format, branded as "96.3 K-Twin." At Midnight on January 1 (after "In Paris" by Jay-Z and Kanye West), the station officially flipped to the new format, with "Misery" by Minneapolis band Soul Asylum being the first song being played, followed by "Beautiful Day" by U2 and "Learn to Fly" by Foo Fighters. The "K-Twin" playlist featured, according to Northern Lights' preview of the change, "today’s guitar based, pop alternative music" and similar, gold-based hits from 1985 onward. "K-Twin", though it was described as a modern adult contemporary format with an alternative rock lean, was classified as adult top 40 because of rhythmic content (such as Bruno Mars' "It Will Rain") and non-alternative classic hits (such as Def Leppard's "Pour Some Sugar on Me"), and to differ itself from Hot AC rival KSTP-FM (that station reports to the Mediabase/BDS hot AC panels). Even some 1970s staples could be found on the station, such as "Jammin'" by Bob Marley. The artist roster on "K-Twin" featured acts ranging from Bon Jovi and U2 to Adele and Green Day, along with songs and artists that, according to Northern Lights, "aren't currently being played in the (Twin Cities) market." It leaned in a much older direction versus KSTP; however, as of April 2012, the station was listed on the Nielsen BDS hot AC panel. The station in the Modern AC era also competed against Cities 97, which shared many of the titles played.

Another noticeable emphasis of "K-Twin" was its connections with Twin Cities listeners and its employment of local personalities, including a morning show (which debuted on January 4) that featured Tone E. Fly, a KDWB alum and a former "B96" and "96.3 Now" jock, former Miss Minnesota International contestant Danni Star who is also a former "Now" jock, and KARE news personality Eric Perkins.

With the flip to "K-Twin", the station changed its call sign to KTWN-FM, which mirrored the calls on Northern Lights' country-formatted AM station in Glencoe. The calls and "K-Twin" branding were originally used by what is now KQQL from 1968 to 1983.

By the spring of 2012, KTWN-FM evolved to a straightforward hot adult contemporary format, playing hits from the 1980s, 1990s, 2000s and today. The station was trying to fill a void left by KSTP-FM, which had moved closer towards Top 40 (CHR).

On August 15, 2012, the Minnesota Twins announced KTWN-FM would be the team's new radio flagship, starting with the 2013 season.

By October 2013, KTWN-FM transformed again, shifting away from Hot AC into more of a gold-based AAA direction with the addition of artists such as The Beatles, Neil Young, The Rolling Stones, The Who, and Led Zeppelin. However, KTWN-FM occasionally threw in some 1990s songs from bands like Blues Traveler, Dave Matthews Band, Counting Crows, and Gin Blossoms.

During its entire existence as "K-Twin", ratings for the station were anemic, usually below a 2 share of the market (with an average of a 1.7 share per ratings period). With the hybrid mix of baseball and music, the station stayed steady at a mere 1.0 share over the past three monthly ratings periods of 2014. In addition, the station has had a constant turnover in airstaff since launch, such as 96.3 veteran Tony Fly being let go in mid-2012.

=== Go 96.3 (2015–2021) ===
In December 2014, morning host Eric Perkins (who was the final airstaff member remaining from the station's initial launch) and afternoon host Curt Copeland left the station, as rumors abounded that 96.3 was about to undergo a major overhaul of its format, as nine new web domains 963Go.com, 963GoDigital.com, 963GoEvents.com, 963GoInfo.com, 963GoMinnesotaTwins.com, 963GoModern.com, 963GoMusic.com, 963GoTwins.com, and Warehouse963.com were registered for the station. Morning show co-hosts Mark Rider and Rena Sarigianopoulos remained in place.

The station enlisted Minneapolis branding agency Fellow to assist in the transition of the brand. At Midnight on January 1, 2015, 3 years to the hour after "K-Twin" debuted, after playing a set of songs with the word "go" in the title, as well as a block of "end"-themed songs (culminating with "Closing Time" by Minneapolis band Semisonic), KTWN-FM began stunting with a Siri-like text-to-speech voice quoting various movie and pop culture quotes, as well as a countdown to 3 p.m. on January 5. At that time, the station flipped to alternative rock as Go 96.3, launching with 10,000 songs in a row, starting with "Long Way Down" by Robert DeLong. The station continued to be the home affiliate for the Twins until the 2017 season, when Twins broadcasts returned to WCCO. (The Twins had previously been on WCCO radio since their first season in Minnesota in 1961 until the end of the 2006 season.) About a month after the station's launch, the station added a full-time airstaff. The initial lineup of airstaff included Barb Abney, Brian "BT" Turner, Jason Nagel, and the duo of Thorn and Linnea Mohn.

On April 6, 2015, the station launched GoTV, an in-booth music and video content streaming source.

With the Pohlads' purchase of KNOF in September 2015, KTWN-FM was speculated to move to the newly acquired frequency, in order to take advantage of a larger coverage area. This comes as they have registered the domains Go953.com, Go953MN.com and GoNorthMN.com. Instead, a current-based rhythmic contemporary format, under the "Go 95.3" moniker, launched on that frequency at 3 p.m. on January 5, one year to the minute after KTWN launched the "Go" format. Soon after that station's launch, Northern Lights would rebrand as Go Media (though Northern Lights would remain the name of the stations' official licensee).

On January 1, 2017, KTWN-FM changed its call letters to KQGO to match the "Go" branding.

In July 2020, morning show hosts Ben Holsen and Dana Wessel were let go from KQGO due to the financial impact resulting from the COVID-19 pandemic. They were replaced by Jordan Alamat, KQGO's music director and night show host at the time.

=== Air 1 (2021–present) ===
On December 1, 2020, Go Media announced that they would sell KQGO and KZGO (the former KNOF) to the Educational Media Foundation for $2.45 million. With the announcement of the sale, the stations immediately dismissed all on-air staff and shifted to a jockless presentation, which it continued with until the sale officially closed. However, this would cause some problems with operation during said time; by the start of 2021, the station's online stream would abruptly stop operation and never start back up again, and there would be long stretches of only music, with little to no liners or identification, and some songs occasionally being played again after the first playing ended. The FCC officially approved the sale on March 26, 2021, and was consummated on April 12. At 9:06 a.m. on April 13, after playing "Trouble's Coming" by Royal Blood, then the first seconds of "All About You" by The Knocks and Foster The People, the signal was abruptly cut off and the station temporarily went silent, as EMF took operational control. At around 11 a.m. that day, EMF put the station back on the air and flipped the station to the contemporary worship music network Air 1 under the new callsign KMWA. This left the Twin Cities market with no alternative rock station, with Adult Album Alternative station KCMP, Hot AC/Adult Alternative station KTCZ-FM, and the relaunched KQRS-FM being the only stations closer to the alternative rock format.

== HD Radio ==
KMWA broadcasts in HD Radio (digital). In addition to the HD1 channel, which mirrors the KMWA analog signal, KMWA has one other HD sub-channel.

HD2| 96.3-HD2 carried a simulcast of KBHL in Osakis ("PraiseLive"), which was previously heard in the Twin Cities on KNOF before Go Media's acquisition of the station in 2016. With the sale to EMF being consummated on April 12, 2021, the "PraiseLive" programming moved back to 95.3 FM (the former KNOF, with those call letters returning to that frequency the same day as the sale consummation); the HD2 sub-channel and 95.3 FM simulcasted the programming for a few days before changing to a transitional looping message redirecting listeners to the new frequency. On May 3, the HD2 sub-channel flipped to the St. Louis-based “Boost Radio” format of Christian pop/hip hop (which is relayed on translator W225AP (92.9 FM)).

HD3| As of September 9, 2020, the station's HD3 sub-channel was simulcasting Hmong news, talk, and music formatted WIXK. This comes after Hmong Radio Broadcast, LLC's acquisition of previous KFAI translator K294AM (106.7 FM). With the sale to EMF being consummated on April 12, 2021, the HD3 sub-channel went silent; K294AM, which relayed KQGO-HD3, continues to simulcast WIXK, and switched its relay to KEEY-HD3.

In 2021, KMWA-HD3 became K-LOVE. In 2025, the signal became K-LOVE Eras.
