= KARP-FM =

- Dassel, Minnesota; United States
- Broadcast area: Glencoe, Minnesota
- Frequency: 106.9 MHz
- Branding: KARP 106.9

Programming
- Format: Country

Ownership
- Owner: Iowa City Broadcasting Company
- Sister stations: KDUZ

History
- First air date: June 6, 1968 (as KDUZ-FM at 107.1)
- Former call signs: KDUZ-FM (1968–1986); KKJR (1986–2000)
- Former frequencies: 107.1 MHz (1968–1999)

Technical information
- Licensing authority: FCC
- Facility ID: 49139
- Class: C3
- ERP: 7,000 watts
- HAAT: 169 meters (554 ft)
- Transmitter coordinates: 45°2′43″N 94°33′32″W

Links
- Public license information: Public file; LMS
- Webcast: Listen Live
- Website: karpradio.com

KARP-FM (106.9 FM, "Hit 106") is a radio station licensed to serve Dassel, Minnesota, United States. The station, which began broadcasting in 1968, is currently owned by Iowa City Broadcasting Company.

== Programming ==
KARP-FM broadcasts a full-service country music format to the greater Glencoe, Minnesota, area. In addition to its usual music programming, the station airs local news, weather bulletins, high school football, and community affairs programming. KARP-FM airs Major League Baseball games as a member of the Minnesota Twins Radio Network.

== History ==
=== KDUZ-FM ===
The station began licensed operation with 3,000 watts of effective radiated power at 107.1 MHz on June 6, 1968, as KDUZ-FM, a sister station to KDUZ (1260 AM). Because KDUZ was a daytimer, able to broadcast only from sunrise to sunset, KDUZ-FM operated as a simulcast during the day then continued the mix of middle of the road and country music on its own the rest of the night and overnight.

KDUZ-FM was launched under the ownership of the North American Broadcasting Company, part of the Tedesco Group, under company president Albert S. Tedesco. Other key staffers included general manager and news director Heinz R. Fruck, chief engineer Darrell Gander, and program director. These positions would remain stable through the end of the 1970s, with the exception of the program director slot which saw at least four people hold the position in that decade.

=== KKJR ===
On February 7, 1986, the station had the Federal Communications Commission change its call sign to KKJR.

After a successful petition for rule making in 1997, KKJR filed an application with the FCC in April 1998 seeking permission to change the height of its broadcast tower, the antenna's height above average terrain, the location of its transmitter, the station's class from A to C3, and its broadcast frequency from 107.1 to 106.9 MHz. The station also sought to change its community of license from Hutchinson to Dassel, Minnesota. The FCC granted the station a construction permit to make these changes on October 8, 1998.

The station made the switch to the new facility and frequency, operating under program test authority, in March 1999. With the changes came a flip from country music to a satellite-fed hot adult contemporary music format branded as "The Flame". The station received its license to cover these changes on July 6, 1999.

=== KARP-FM ===
In February 2000, North American Broadcasting Company, Inc., reached an agreement to sell this station and sister station KDUZ (1260 AM) to Iowa City Broadcasting Company, Inc., for a reported sale price of $2 million. The deal was approved by the FCC on March 22, 2000, and the transaction was consummated on March 31, 2000. At the time of the sale, KKJR was playing a country music format. The new owners had the call sign changed to KARP-FM on June 15, 2000.
