= New Ulm, Minnesota =

City in Minnesota, United States

- City
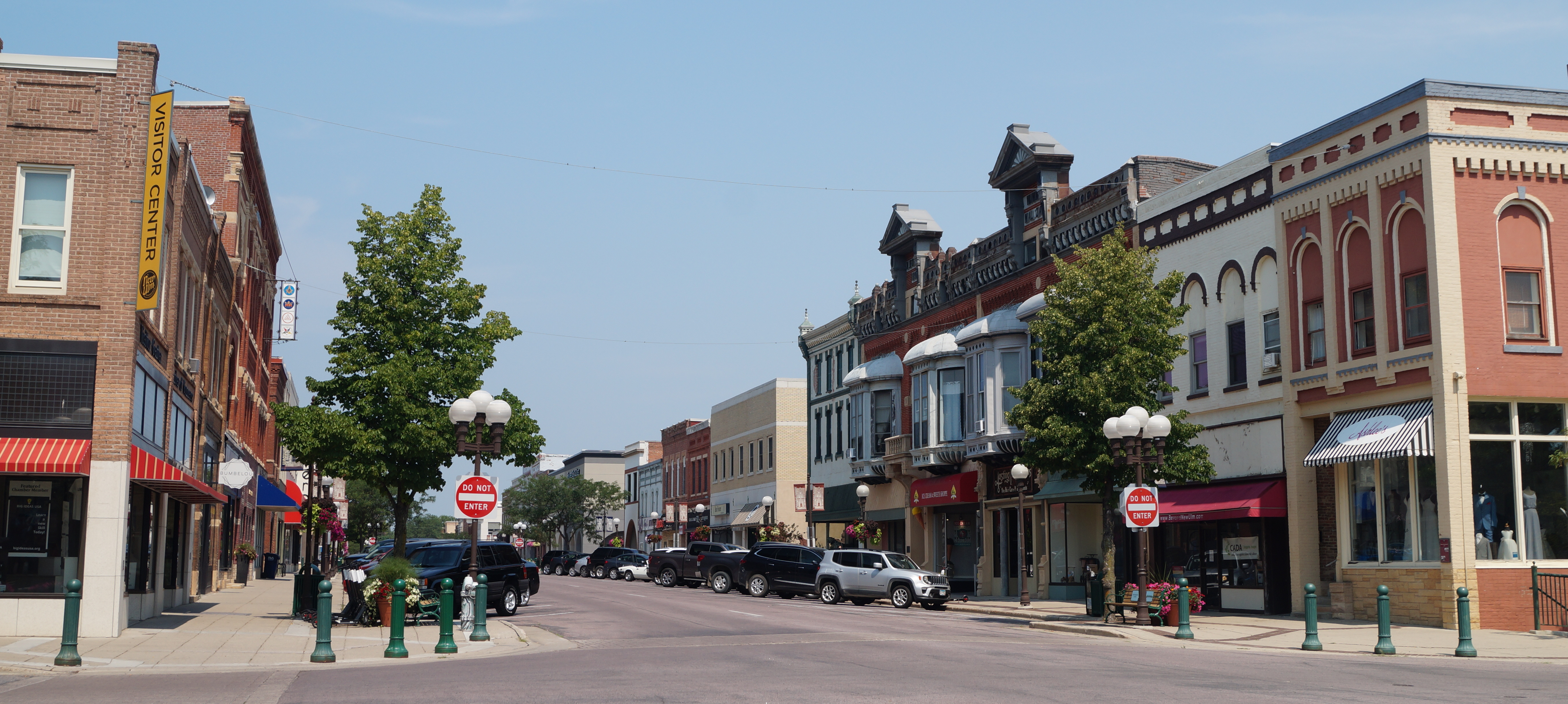
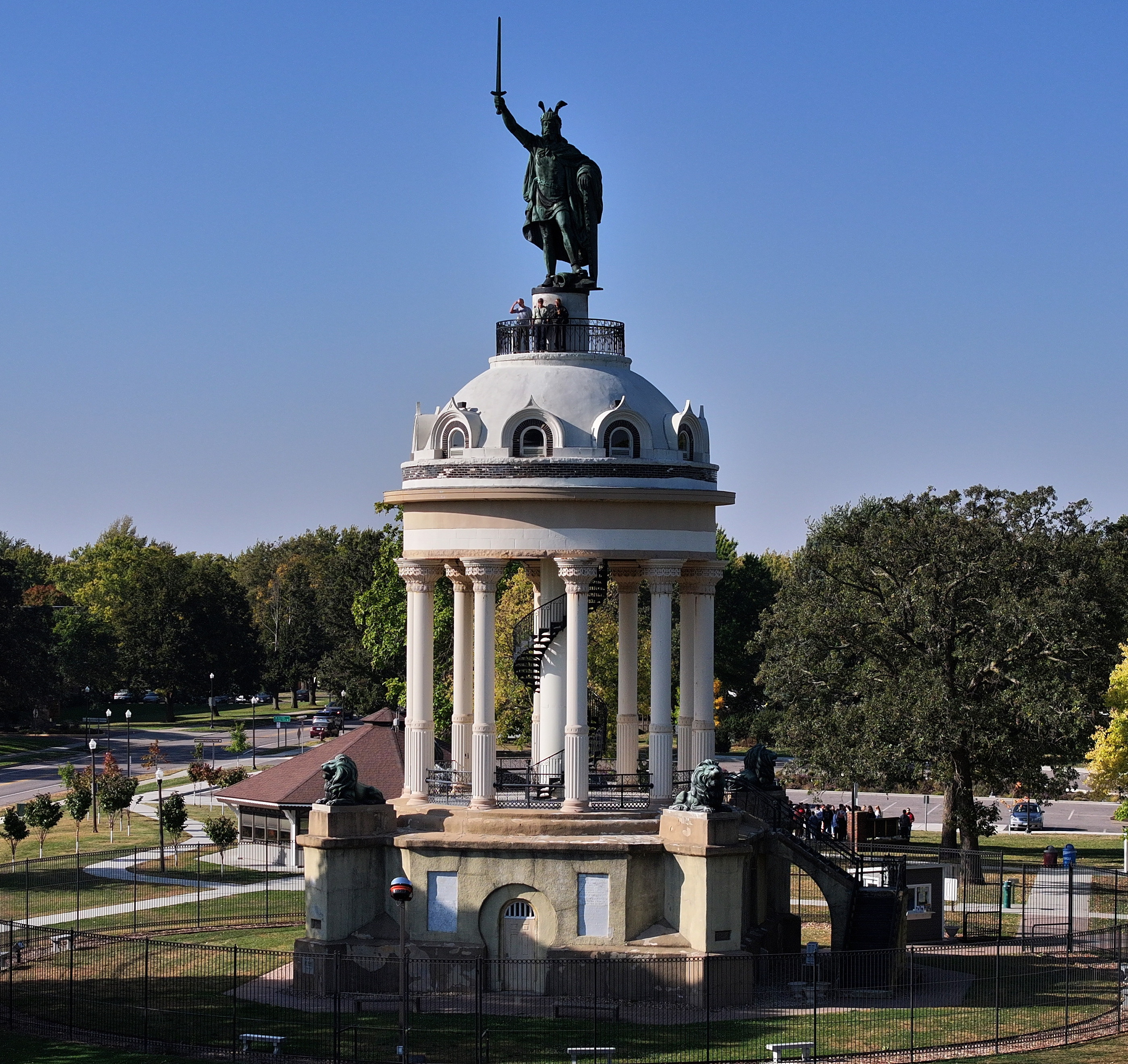
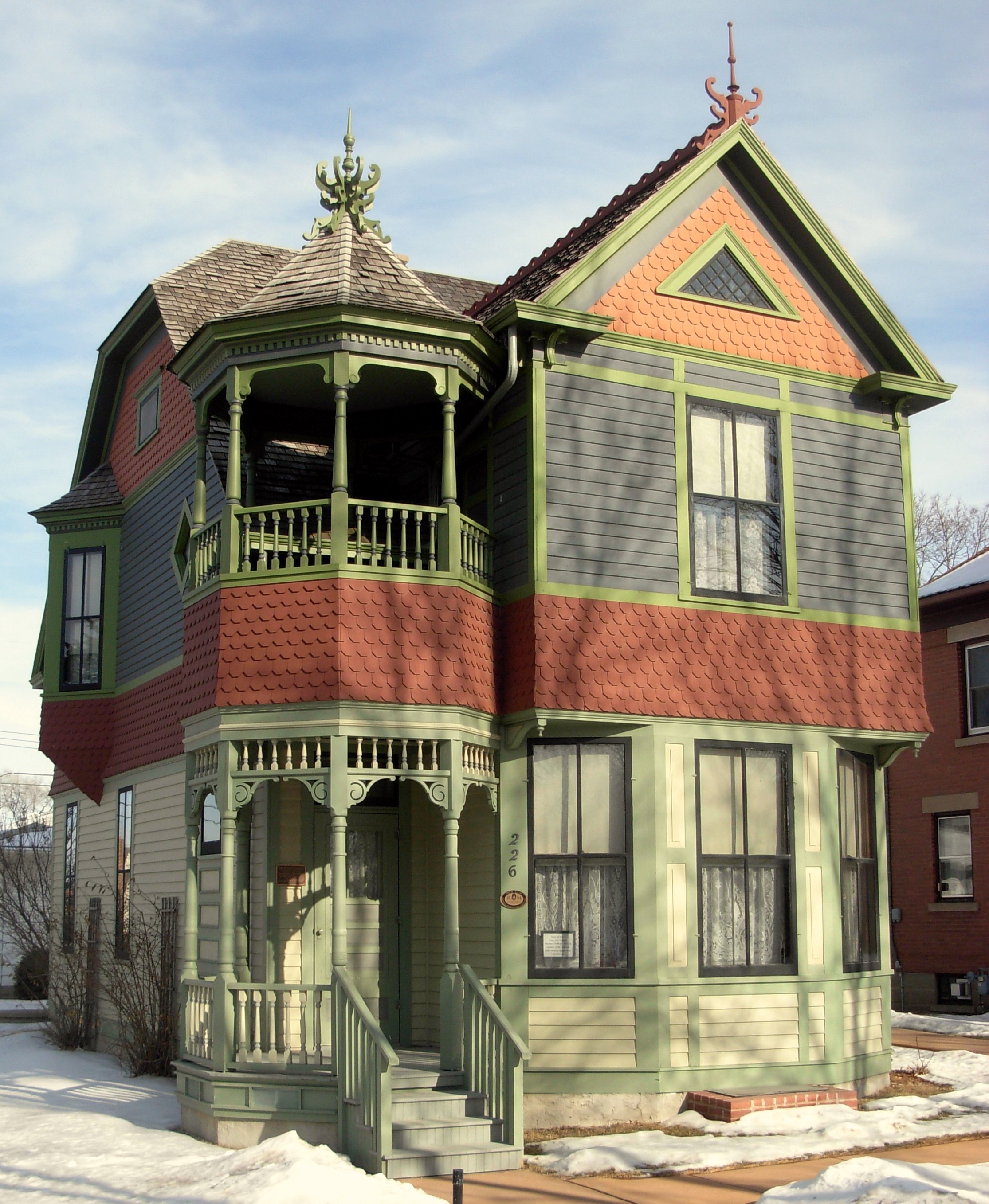
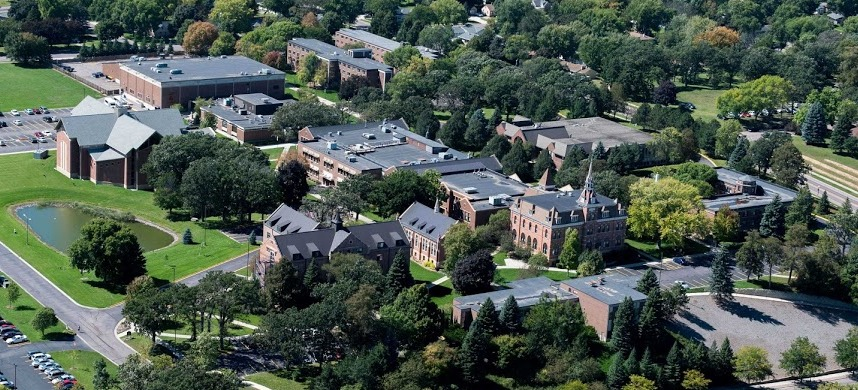
- Downtown New Ulm Hermann Monument Wanda Gág Home Martin Luther College

- Flag Seal
- Motto: "A City of Charm And Tradition"
- Location of the city of New Ulm within Brown County in the state of Minnesota
- Coordinates: 44°18′43″N 94°28′07″W
- Country: United States
- State: Minnesota
- County: Brown
- Named for: Ulm, Germany

Government
  - Type: Mayor – Council
  - Mayor: Kathleen Backer

Area
  - Total: 10.29 sq mi (26.66 km^{2})
  - Land: 10.16 sq mi (26.31 km^{2})
  - Water: 0.14 sq mi (0.36 km^{2})
- Elevation: 896 ft (273 m)

Population (2020)
  - Total: 14,120
  - Estimate (2023): 13,925
  - Density: 1,390.3/sq mi (536.78/km^{2})
- Time zone: UTC-6 (Central (CST))
  - Summer (DST): UTC-5 (CDT)
- ZIP Code: 56073
- Area code: 507
- FIPS code: 27-46042
- GNIS feature ID: 2395217
- Website: https://www.newulmmn.gov/

New Ulm (/ˈnjuː ˈʌlm/ NEW ULM) is a city and the county seat of Brown County, Minnesota, United States. The population was 14,120 at the 2020 census. New Ulm is on the triangle of land formed by the confluence of the Minnesota River and the Cottonwood River.

New Ulm is home to the Hermann Heights Monument, Flandrau State Park, the historic August Schell Brewing Company, and the Minnesota Music Hall of Fame. The city is known for its German heritage and its historical sites and landmarks dating to the US-Dakota War of 1862.

New Ulm is the episcopal see of the Diocese of New Ulm and home to the Handmaids of the Heart of Jesus. The Dakota called New Ulm the "Village on the Cottonwood" or Wachupata.

== History ==
=== Settlement ===
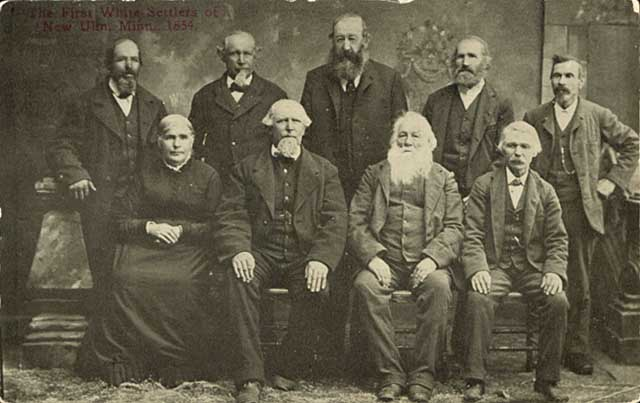
The first European-American settlers of New Ulm, 1854.

New Ulm was founded in 1854 by the German Land Company of Chicago. It was named after the city of Ulm in the state of Baden-Württemberg in southern Germany. Ulm and Neu-Ulm (which may have inspired the name) are twin cities, with Ulm on the Baden-Württemberg side of the Danube River and Neu-Ulm on the Bavarian side. In part due to the Minnesota city's German heritage, it became a center for brewing in the Upper Midwest. It is home to the August Schell Brewing Company. The Sioux called it Wakzupata, which roughly means "village on the cottonwood".

In 1856, the Settlement Association of the Socialist Turner Society ("Turners") helped secure New Ulm's future. The Turners (German for "gymnasts") originated in Germany in the first half of the 19th century. Their motto was "Sound Mind, Sound Body". Their clubs combined gymnastics with lectures and debates about the issues of the day. After the failed Revolutions of 1848, many Germans emigrated to the United States. Turners formed associations (Vereins) throughout the eastern, midwestern, and western states. They were the largest secular German-American organization in the country in the 19th century.

After a series of attacks by nativist mobs in major cities such as Chicago, Cincinnati, and Louisville, a national convention of Turners authorized the formation of a colony on the frontier. Intending to develop a community that expressed Turner ideals, the Settlement Association joined the Chicago Germans, who had struggled due to lack of capital. The Turners supplied that, as well as hundreds of colonists from the east who arrived in 1856.

The city plan represented Turner ideals. The German Land Company hired Christian Prignitz to complete the plan for New Ulm, which was filed in April 1858. This master plan expressed a grand vision of the city's future. At the heart of the community stood blocks reserved for Turner Hall, the county courthouse, and a public school, representing the community's political, social, and educational centers. The westernmost avenues were named after U.S. heroes George Washington, Benjamin Franklin, Thomas Jefferson, and Thomas Paine—the latter three noted for their freethinking philosophies. Members were given the means to support themselves—in harmony with nature—through the distribution of four-acre garden lots outside the residential area. Historian Dennis Gimmestad wrote:

The founders' goals created a community persona that sets New Ulm apart from the Minnesota towns founded by land speculators or railroad companies.... The New Ulm founders aspired to establish a town with a defined philosophical, economic, and social character.

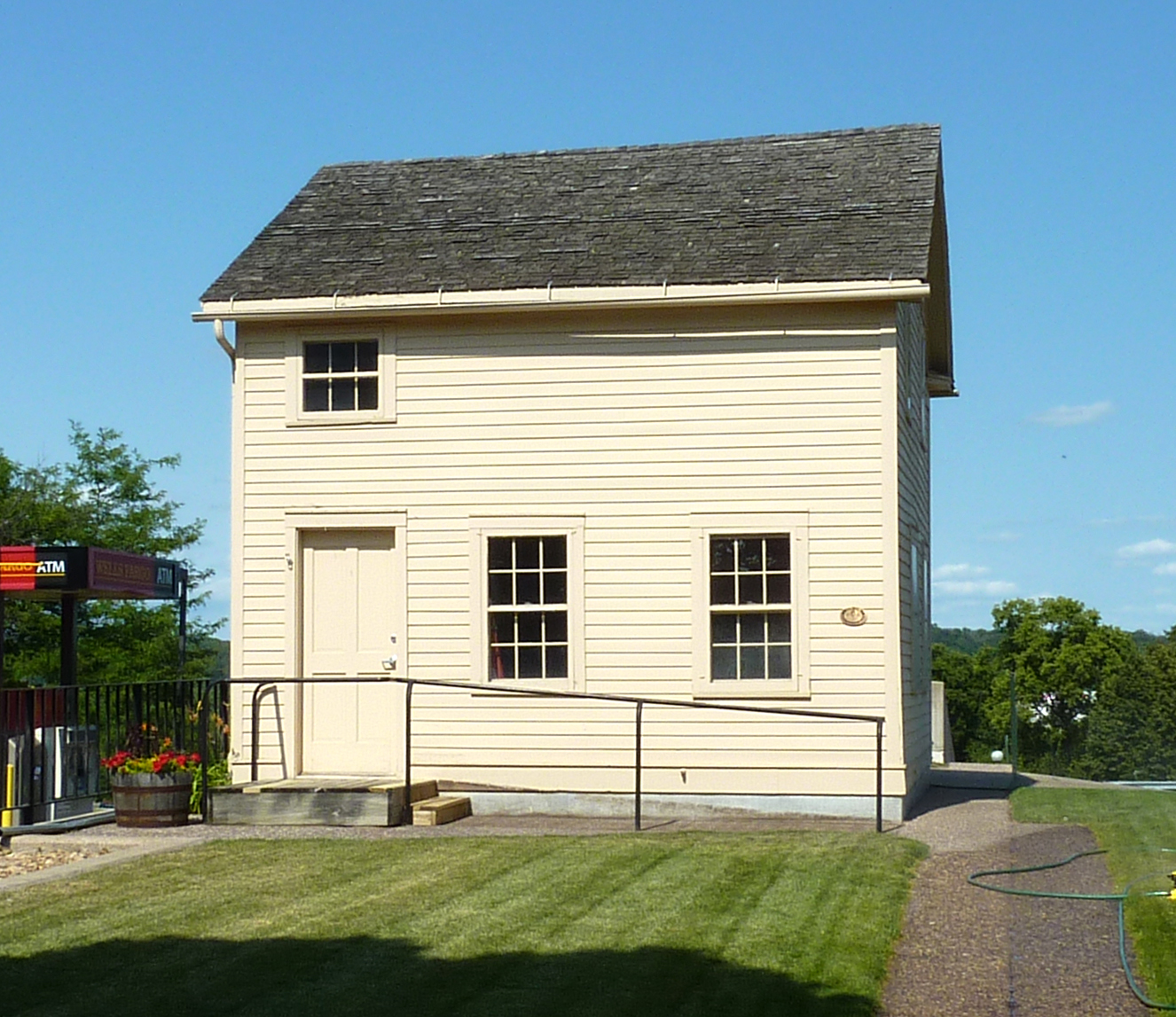
The Kiesling House was one of three downtown buildings to survive the Dakota War. It is listed on the National Register of Historic Places.

=== U.S.–Dakota War of 1862 ===
On August 18, 1862, the US-Dakota War began with the attack at the Lower Sioux Agency 30 miles up the Minnesota River from New Ulm. As the closest significant town to the Dakota Reservation, New Ulm fell under attack by a Mdewakanton force the next day. A hastily formed militia of townspeople repelled the attack and immediately set about constructing barricades around the town center.

The Dakota returned with a larger force on August 23. Bolstered by the timely arrival of volunteer militia from other towns under Charles Flandrau, the outnumbered defenders of New Ulm again repelled the attack. But most of the town outside the barricades was burned, leaving only 49 buildings to house a population of 2,500. Short of shelter and ammunition and facing outbreaks of disease, most of the population evacuated to Mankato on August 25. The dead were buried in New Ulm's streets.

=== 1881 Tornado ===
On July 15, 1881, New Ulm was struck by a large tornado that killed six people and injured 53.

=== World War I and II ===
Between the outbreak of World War I in 1914 and U.S. entry into the conflict, the citizens of New Ulm closely followed events in Europe. Local newspapers printed news from relatives and friends in Germany. In an unofficial April 1917 referendum, local voters opposed war by a margin of 466 to 19. Even as President Woodrow Wilson prepared his Declaration of War, a Brown County delegation arrived in Washington, D.C. to voice its opposition to that action.

The Wilson administration organized an active campaign to suppress antiwar fervor, joined on the state level by Minnesota Governor James Burnquist. The Minnesota Commission of Public Safety was granted broad powers to protect the state and assist in the war effort. Specific actions the commission took included surveillance of alleged subversive activities, mobilization of opposition to labor unions and strikes (which were considered even more suspect in wartime), pursuit of draft evaders, and registration and monitoring of aliens (foreign nationals).

Given the German heritage of most New Ulm residents, federal and state agents began to visit the city soon after the United States entered the war. They filed reports to offices in Washington and St. Paul because immigrants and first-generation ethnics were suspected of having divided loyalties at best, and perhaps favoring Prussia and the Central Powers. Several local business and civic leaders joined efforts to root out antiwar fervor.

On July 25, 1917, a rally attended by 10,000 people was held on the grounds of Turner Hall. The people had gathered to “enter a protest against sending American soldiers to a foreign country.” Speakers included New Ulm Mayor Louis Fritsche; Albert Pfaender, city attorney and former minority leader of the Minnesota House of Representatives; Adolph Ackermann, director of Dr. Martin Luther College; and F. H. Retzlaff, a prominent businessman. Federal and state agents mingled through the crowd, gathering information.

A month later, Burnquist removed Fritsche and Pfaender from their positions. The Commission of Public Safety pressured the college to fire Ackermann. These blows sharply divided the community—on one side, many residents took the removals as an attack on the city's heritage and traditions. Pfaender was the son and Fritsche the son-in-law of the city's principal founder, Wilhelm Pfaender. On the other side, prominent local businessmen, including flour mill managers, feared economic repercussions and promoted pro-war parades and bond drives.

During World War II, German POWs were housed in a camp immediately southeast of New Ulm, in what is now Flandrau State Park. In 1944, a New Ulm family was fined $300 for removing a prisoner from the camp, housing him, and taking him to church.

== Geography ==
According to the United States Census Bureau, the city has an area of 10.26 square miles (26.57 km^{2}), of which 9.92 square miles (25.69 km^{2}) is land and 0.34 square miles (0.88 km^{2}) is water. The Minnesota River and the Cottonwood River flow past the city on their way to the Mississippi River.

=== Climate ===
New Ulm has a hot-summer humid continental climate (Köppen Dfa/Dwa) and experiences four distinct seasons. Summers are typically warm to hot with thunderstorms being common. Winters are quite cold and snowy, yet not quite as snowy as areas further east in Minnesota.

Climate data for New Ulm (NEW ULM 2 SE, MN US), 1981–2010 normals, extremes 1893–present
Month	Jan	Feb	Mar	Apr	May	Jun	Jul	Aug	Sep	Oct	Nov	Dec	Year
Record high °F (°C)	65 (18)	68 (20)	87 (31)	95 (35)	103 (39)	107 (42)	111 (44)	107 (42)	106 (41)	92 (33)	83 (28)	73 (23)	111 (44)
Mean daily maximum °F (°C)	23.7 (−4.6)	29.1 (−1.6)	41.2 (5.1)	57.9 (14.4)	69.9 (21.1)	78.9 (26.1)	82.9 (28.3)	80.2 (26.8)	72.3 (22.4)	59.5 (15.3)	42.1 (5.6)	26.6 (−3.0)	55.4 (13.0)
Daily mean °F (°C)	14.7 (−9.6)	19.8 (−6.8)	32.0 (0.0)	47.0 (8.3)	59.4 (15.2)	68.9 (20.5)	73.1 (22.8)	70.4 (21.3)	61.5 (16.4)	48.6 (9.2)	33.3 (0.7)	18.4 (−7.6)	45.6 (7.5)
Mean daily minimum °F (°C)	5.7 (−14.6)	10.4 (−12.0)	22.8 (−5.1)	36.0 (2.2)	48.9 (9.4)	58.9 (14.9)	63.2 (17.3)	60.7 (15.9)	50.8 (10.4)	37.7 (3.2)	24.5 (−4.2)	10.3 (−12.1)	35.8 (2.1)
Record low °F (°C)	−37 (−38)	−37 (−38)	−28 (−33)	−3 (−19)	19 (−7)	31 (−1)	39 (4)	34 (1)	16 (−9)	1 (−17)	−17 (−27)	−36 (−38)	−37 (−38)
Average precipitation inches (mm)	0.64 (16)	0.64 (16)	1.86 (47)	2.86 (73)	3.44 (87)	4.82 (122)	3.98 (101)	4.10 (104)	3.21 (82)	2.26 (57)	1.62 (41)	0.86 (22)	30.29 (768)
Average snowfall inches (cm)	7.9 (20)	6.2 (16)	7.6 (19)	1.7 (4.3)	0.04 (0.10)	0 (0)	0 (0)	0 (0)	0 (0)	0.4 (1.0)	6.9 (18)	9.0 (23)	39.74 (101.4)
Average precipitation days (≥ 0.01 in)	6	6	8	9	11	11	9	9	9	7	6	6	97
Source: Western Regional Climate Center

== Demographics ==
Historical population
Census	Pop.	Note	%±
1860	635		—
1870	1,310		106.3%
1880	2,471		88.6%
1890	3,741		51.4%
1900	5,403		44.4%
1910	5,648		4.5%
1920	6,745		19.4%
1930	7,308		8.3%
1940	8,743		19.6%
1950	9,348		6.9%
1960	11,114		18.9%
1970	13,051		17.4%
1980	13,755		5.4%
1990	13,132		−4.5%
2000	13,594		3.5%
2010	13,522		−0.5%
2020	14,120		4.4%
2023 (est.)	13,925		−1.4%
U.S. Decennial Census; 2020 Census

In 2002, the U.S. Census Bureau released a report showing that 65.85% of New Ulm's population had German ancestry, more per capita than any other city in the U.S.

=== 2020 census ===
As of the 2020 census, New Ulm had a population of 14,120. The median age was 41.0 years. 20.8% of residents were under the age of 18 and 22.0% of residents were 65 years of age or older. For every 100 females there were 96.1 males, and for every 100 females age 18 and over there were 92.6 males age 18 and over.

95.1% of residents lived in urban areas, while 4.9% lived in rural areas.

There were 6,031 households in New Ulm, of which 24.8% had children under the age of 18 living in them. Of all households, 45.4% were married-couple households, 19.7% were households with a male householder and no spouse or partner present, and 28.3% were households with a female householder and no spouse or partner present. About 36.3% of all households were made up of individuals and 16.7% had someone living alone who was 65 years of age or older.

There were 6,403 housing units, of which 5.8% were vacant. The homeowner vacancy rate was 1.3% and the rental vacancy rate was 7.7%.

Racial composition as of the 2020 census
Race	Number	Percent
White	13,287	94.1%
Black or African American	101	0.7%
American Indian and Alaska Native	25	0.2%
Asian	84	0.6%
Native Hawaiian and Other Pacific Islander	3	0.0%
Some other race	166	1.2%
Two or more races	454	3.2%
Hispanic or Latino (of any race)	470	3.3%

=== 2010 census ===
As of the census of 2010, there were 13,522 people, 5,732 households, and 3,511 families residing in the city. The population density was 1,363.1 inhabitants per square mile (526.3/km^{2}). There were 5,987 housing units at an average density of 603.5 per square mile (233.0/km^{2}). The racial makeup of the city was 97.8% White, 0.3% African American, 0.1% Native American, 0.7% Asian, 0.4% from other races, and 0.8% from two or more races. Hispanic or Latino of any race were 1.8% of the population.

There were 5,732 households, of which 25.7% had children under the age of 18 living with them, 48.6% were married couples living together, 8.8% had a female householder with no husband present, 3.9% had a male householder with no wife present, and 38.7% were non-families. 33.9% of all households were made up of individuals, and 15.2% had someone living alone who was 65 years of age or older. The average household size was 2.20 and the average family size was 2.80.

The median age in the city was 41.4 years. 20.7% of residents were under the age of 18; 11.7% were between the ages of 18 and 24; 21.6% were from 25 to 44; 27.6% were from 45 to 64; and 18.6% were 65 years of age or older. The gender makeup of the city was 49.1% male and 50.9% female.

=== 2000 census ===
As of the census of 2000, there were 13,594 people, 5,494 households, and 3,554 families residing in the city. The population density was 1,548.3 inhabitants per square mile (597.8/km^{2}). There were 5,736 housing units at an average density of 653.3 per square mile (252.2/km^{2}). The racial makeup of the city was 98.10% White, 0.11% African American, 0.15% Native American, 0.46% Asian, 0.03% Pacific Islander, 0.50% from other races, and 0.65% from two or more races. Hispanic or Latino of any race were 1.26% of the population.

There were 5,494 households among which 29.6% had children under the age of 18 living with them, 52.9% were married couples living together, 8.9% had a female householder with no husband present, and 35.3% were non-families. 31.0% of all households were made up of individuals, and 14.4% had someone living alone who was 65 years of age or older. The average household size was 2.31 and the average family size was 2.89.

In the city, the population was spread out, with 23.1% under the age of 18, 12.6% from 18 to 24, 25.5% from 25 to 44, 22.2% from 45 to 64, and 16.6% who were 65 years of age or older. The median age was 38 years. For every 100 females, there were 95.7 males. For every 100 females age 18 and over, there were 92.2 males.

The median income for a household in the city was $40,044, and the median income for a family was $51,309. Males had a median income of $34,196 versus $24,970 for females. The per capita income for the city was $20,308. About 4.6% of families and 6.2% of the population were below the poverty line, including 7.1% of those under age 18 and 10.0% of those age 65 or over.

== Arts and culture ==
=== Arbeitsverein ===
The Germans of New Ulm organized an Arbeiterverein in 1871, with the purpose of morally and intellectually aiding workers, sharing mutual aid, and maintaining a hall and library.

=== Sites ===
==== Turner Hall ====
New Ulm Turner Hall, whose oldest section was built in 1873, was listed in the National Register of Historic Places in 1979. It is the oldest Turner Hall in the United States still in its original use. The north half of the building is a combination of exterior wall elements of a 1901 hall/theater that burned in 1952 with a 1953 interior and main facade. Turner Hall remains one of the most active in the country. Its Rathskeller is likely Minnesota's oldest continuously used bar, and its gymnastics program is also the state's oldest. The Rathskeller features murals of scenes from Germany, painted by Guido Methua (1873), Christian Heller (1887), and Anton Gag (1901). These were recently restored with support from a grant from the Minnesota Historical Society.

==== Brown County Historical Society ====
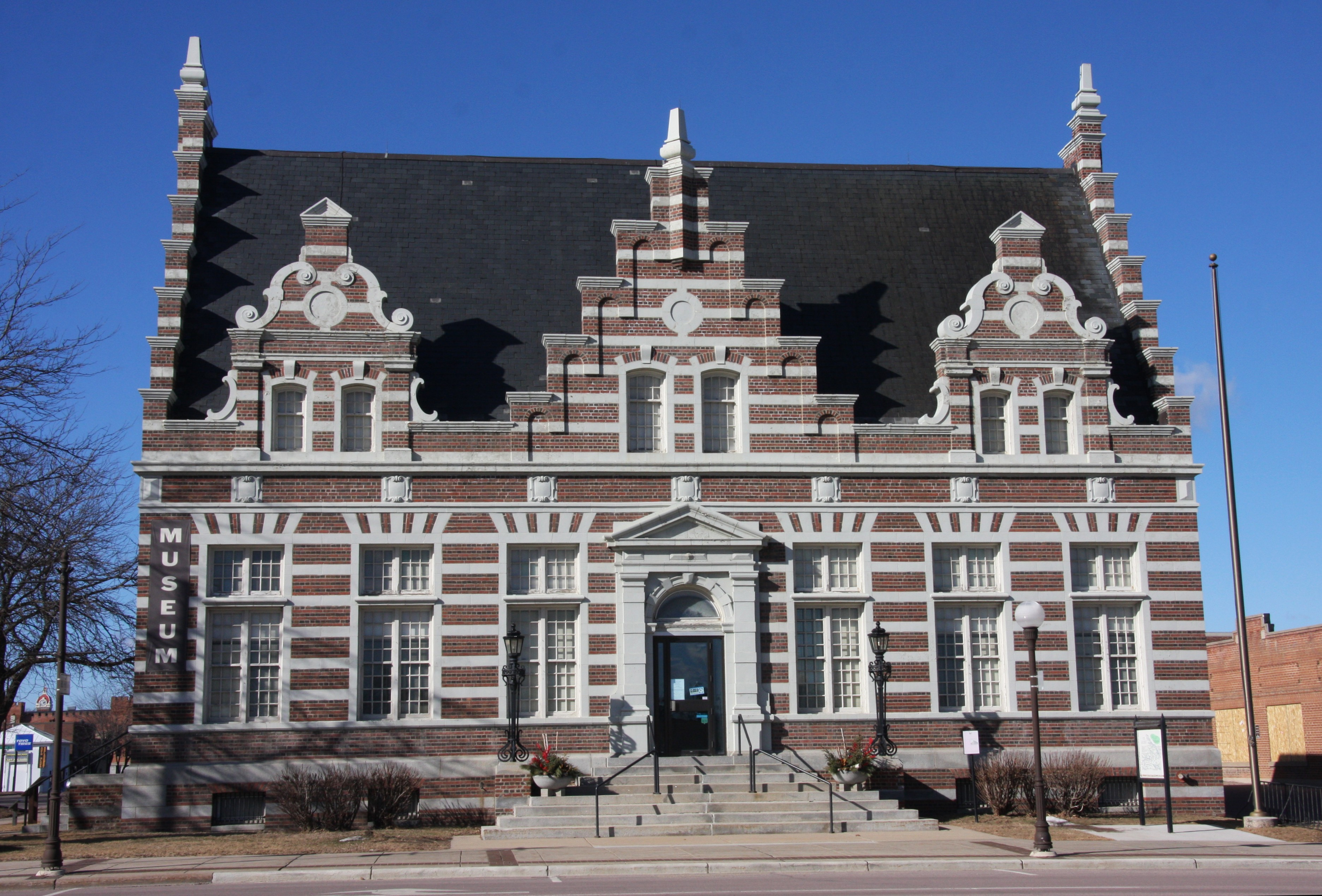
The Historical Museum is housed in the old post office building, listed in the NRHP.

The Brown County Historical Society, at 2 North Broadway, houses three floors of exhibits and one of the state's largest archives. It contains over 5,500 family files, microfilm of census, naturalization, church, cemetery, and birth and death records, as well as business and history files.

==== Defender's monument ====
At Center and State Streets, Defender's Monument was erected in 1891 by the State of Minnesota to honor the memory of the defenders who aided New Ulm during the Dakota War of 1862. The artwork at the base was created by New Ulm artist Anton Gag. The monument has not been changed since its completion except for being moved to the middle of the block.

==== Hermann monument ====
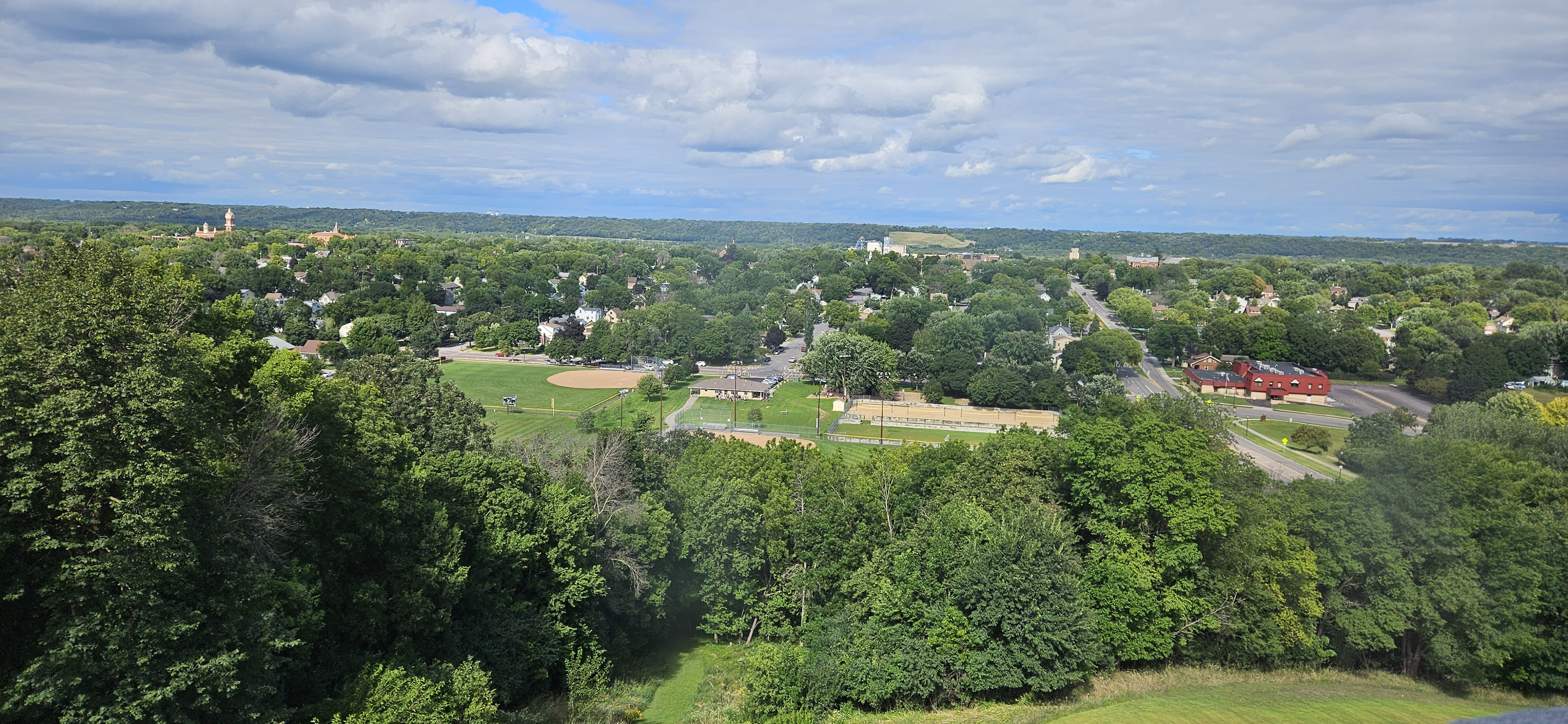
Looking east at New Ulm from the Hermann Monument

The Hermann Monument in New Ulm dominates the Minnesota River valley from a hill overlooking the city. Inspired by a similar monument, the Hermannsdenkmal near Detmold, Germany, the figure served as a symbol for members of the Sons of Hermann, a fraternal organization of German Americans. In 1885, the nation's 362 Sons of Hermann lodges committed to construct a monument representing their cultural heritage. Through the efforts of Minnesota's 53 Sons of Hermann lodges, the monument was built in New Ulm, home to many German immigrants. The sculptor chosen for this project was a German sculptor from Ohio, Alfons Pelzer. A delegation from New Ulm visited Ulm in 2009 and went to the Teutoburger Forest and Detmold to commemorate the 2,000th anniversary of the Battle of the Teutoburg Forest, when Arminius, a chieftain of the Cherusci, a Germanic tribe, defeated a Roman army led by Varus.

==== German Bohemian monument ====
A monument to German-Bohemian immigration to America is in New Ulm. It was erected in 1991 by the German-Bohemian Heritage Society to honor the German-Bohemian immigrants who arrived the area, mostly by a boat landing on the Minnesota River 150 yards to the east. The immigrants came mostly from small villages, with the largest number from the village centers of Hostau, Muttersdorf, and Ronsperg. Most of them were Catholic farmers who spoke a Bohemian dialect of German.

Inscribed in granite slabs around the base of the monument are the surnames of over 350 immigrant families. Many of these names are still prominent in the region. As more immigrants arrived, not all of whom could farm, they settled in New Ulm and some of the small communities to the west and north.

The bronze statue atop the granite base was designed and sculpted by Leopold Hafner, a German-Bohemian sculptor who now lives near Passau, Germany.

The monument is at 200 North German Street and is open year-round.

==== Glockenspiel in Schonlau Park ====
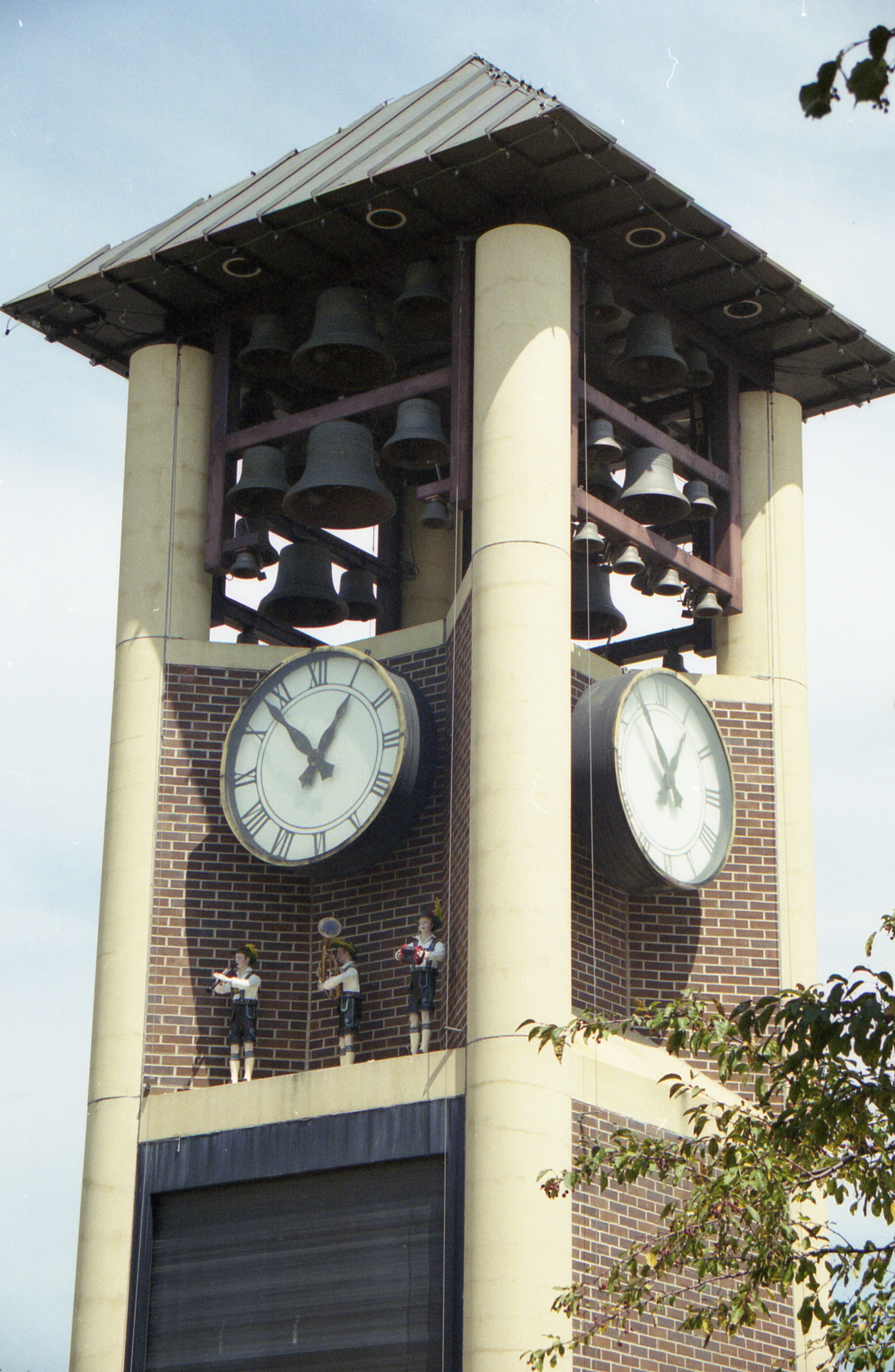
The Glockenspiel bell tower

New Ulm's glockenspiel is one of the world's few free-standing carillon clock towers. It stands 45 feet high, and its largest Bourdon weighs 595 pounds. The bells weigh two tons all together. They chime the time of day in Westminster style.

==== Minnesota Music Hall of Fame ====
In 1990, the Minnesota Music Hall of Fame was established in New Ulm. It displays music memorabilia from around the state.

==== Polka capital of the nation ====
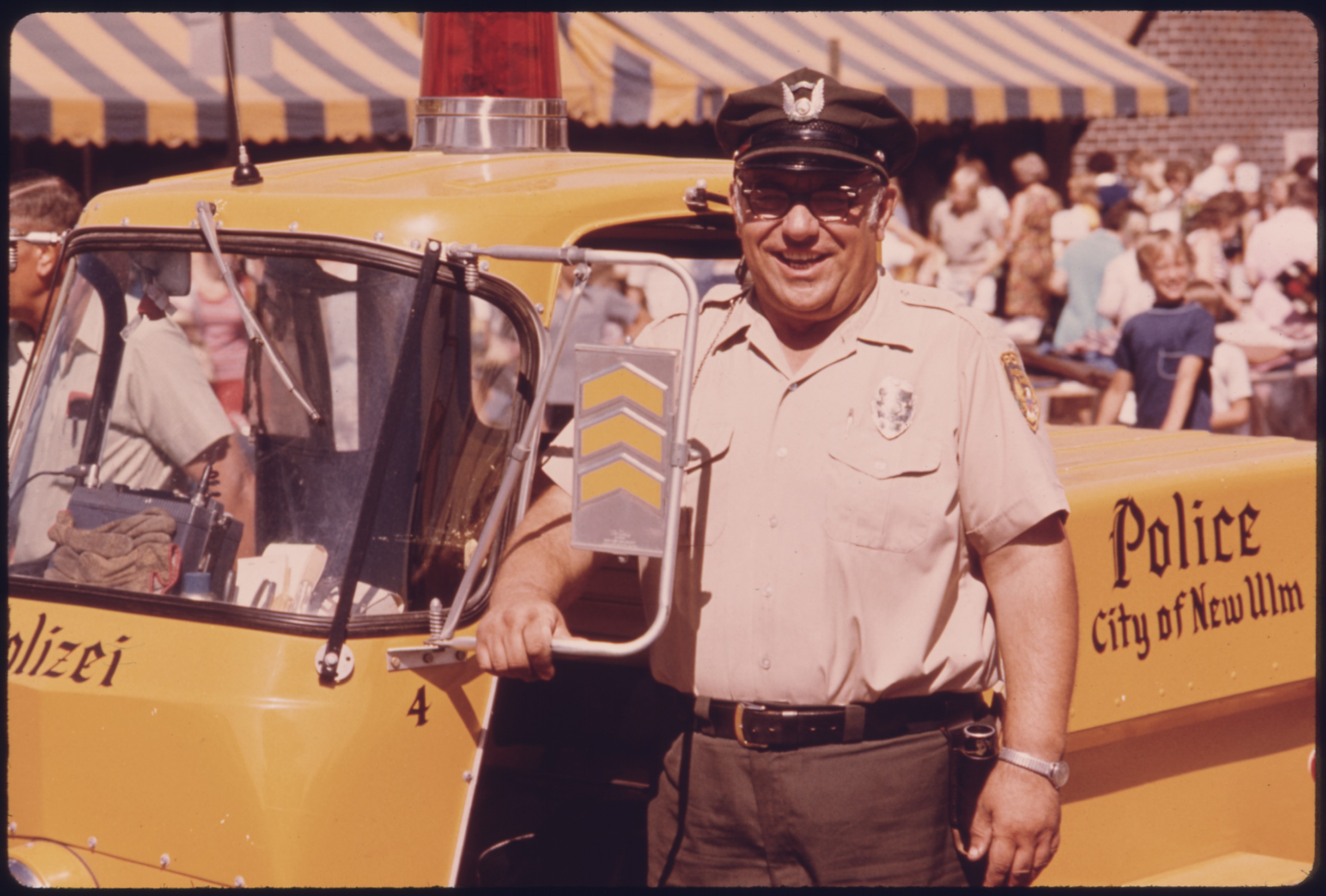
Parking meter checker stands by his police vehicle in 1974, which is imprinted with the German word for police (Polizei), part of the town's highlighting its German ethnic origins. Photo by Flip Schulke.

Music has always been part of life in New Ulm, especially with the arrival of the musically inclined Sudeten Germans in the 1870s.

Whoopee John Wilfahrt's career opened the door to what became known as "Old-Time" music. After him, other local bands such as those led by Harold Loeffelmacher, Babe Wagner, Elmer Scheid, and Fezz Fritsche kept New Ulm well known around the state and region. They even produced nationally popular recordings.

With the opening of George's Ballroom and the New Ulm Ballroom and the start of KNUJ radio station in the 1940s, New Ulm billed itself as the "Polka Capital of the Nation". New Ulm's Polka Days were known worldwide by polka lovers. The festival was held each year in July. Polka Bands played on Minnesota Street and people danced and drank beer until well past midnight.

=== Festivals ===
Local events held annually in New Ulm celebrate German culture through food, music, and beer. New Ulm's Oktoberfest has been celebrated the first two weekends in October since 1981. Bock Fest, often held concurrently with the local festivities for Fasching, has been celebrated since 1987 at the August Schell Brewing Company. Bavarian Blast, a summer festival, was created as reinterpretation of New Ulm's longstanding festival Heritagefest.

== Parks and recreation ==
The city features over 40 parks, as well as a civic center, community center, and recreation center. The parks and recreation department employs "nearly 100 employees" annually, with an annual budget of $3.8 million.

== Government ==
Presidential election results 1960–2020

Precinct General Election Results
Year	Republican	Democratic	Third parties
2020	56.8% 4,442	40.7% 3,179	2.5% 197
2016	56.1% 4,166	33.0% 2,445	10.9% 809
2012	51.3% 3,825	45.5% 3,395	3.2% 243
2008	51.5% 3,810	45.8% 3,389	2.7% 196
2004	56.8% 4,212	41.2% 3,052	2.0% 146
2000	52.6% 3,720	39.1% 2,764	8.3% 585
1996	42.3% 2,727	43.4% 2,792	14.3% 923
1992	40.8% 2,824	34.2% 2,368	25.0% 1,736
1988	55.2% 3,313	44.8% 2,691	0.0% 0
1984	61.2% 3,882	38.8% 2,459	0.0% 0
1980	53.1% 3,723	38.2% 2,676	8.7% 614
1976	54.3% 3,740	41.4% 2,853	4.3% 298
1972	62.1% 3,773	34.6% 2,106	3.3% 201
1968	55.9% 3,059	38.8% 2,124	5.3% 289
1964	49.9% 2,600	50.0% 2,605	0.1% 9
1960	58.6% 3,076	41.3% 2,164	0.1% 6

== Education ==
Schools include:

- Cathedral High School
- New Ulm High School
- Minnesota Valley Lutheran High School
- Martin Luther College

== Media ==
=== Newspaper ===
The Journal is a daily newspaper in New Ulm with a circulation of 5,248 as of 2019. Founded in 1898, it is owned by Ogden Newspapers.

=== Radio ===
New Ulm is the city of license for KNUJ (860 AM), and KNAT (93.1 FM), which broadcasts country music from Mankato.

=== Filming location ===
New Ulm was the setting and filming location for the 1995 independent film The Toilers and the Wayfarers and the filming location for the 2004 documentary American Beer.

== Infrastructure ==
=== Transportation ===
Transit service in the city is provided by Hermann Express.

Highways include U.S. Highway 14 and Minnesota State Highways 15 and 68.

New Ulm is served by the Union Pacific's line between Wyeville and Rapid City. The Minneapolis and St. Louis Railway ran from Winthrop to Otho before being abandoned in the 1970s.

New Ulm Municipal Airport is a general aviation airport.

== Notable people ==
- Ali Bernard, 2008 Olympic wrestler, born in New Ulm in 1986
- Joseph Bobleter, newspaper editor, Minnesota legislator, and mayor of New Ulm
- Kathryn Adams Doty, actress, born in New Ulm in 1920
- Marion Downs, audiologist who pioneered newborn hearing screening, born in New Ulm in 1914
- Robert A. Duin, U.S. Coast Guard Rear Admiral, born in New Ulm in 1924.
- Tony Eckstein, former Minnesota politician, legislator and New Ulm mayor, born in New Ulm in 1923
- Brad Finstad, U.S. representative for Minnesota
- Dennis R. Frederickson, Minnesota state legislator
- Wanda Gág, author and artist, born in New Ulm in 1893. Her childhood home is open to tour.
- Tippi Hedren, actress, born in New Ulm in 1930; She starred in Alfred Hitchcock's films The Birds and Marnie.
- Joseph Hofmeister, Bohemian American music composer
- Ben D. Hughes, farmer and Minnesota state legislator
- Harold G. Krieger, Minnesota state senator and judge, born in New Ulm in 1926
- John Lind, although born in Sweden, immigrated to the U.S. and called New Ulm his hometown. He was the 14th governor of Minnesota and later served as a United States Congressman
- Harold Loeffelmacher, polka bandleader, born near New Ulm in 1905
- Brad Lohaus, retired National Basketball Association player, born in New Ulm in 1964
- Jen Nagel, Bishop of the Minneapolis Area Synod of the Evangelical Lutheran Church of America.
- William Pfaender, businessman, Minnesota state treasurer, and legislator; served as mayor of New Ulm.
- David Rysdahl, actor, born in New Ulm in 1987
- August Schell moved to New Ulm from Germany in 1848, starting the August Schell Brewing Company. The brewery is still in business today. He died in New Ulm in 1891.
- Flip Schulke, photojournalist who traveled with Martin Luther King Jr.
- Natalie Denise Sperl, model and actress, born in New Ulm in 1977
- Terry Steinbach, former Oakland A's catcher, born in New Ulm in 1962
- Thomas O. Streissguth, Minnesota Supreme Court justice
- Lenore Ulric, actress and movie star, born in New Ulm in 1892
- Hal Wick, South Dakota state legislator, born in New Ulm in 1944
- Whoopee John Wilfahrt, polka bandleader, born in 1893 on a farm near New Ulm

== In popular culture ==
New Ulm is the setting for the 2009 comedy New in Town.

== Sister cities ==
New Ulm is twinned with:

- Neu-Ulm, Bavaria, Germany
