= Minnesota Music Hall of Fame =

Music museum in New Ulm, Minnesota

Coordinates: 44°18′47.5″N 94°27′42″W

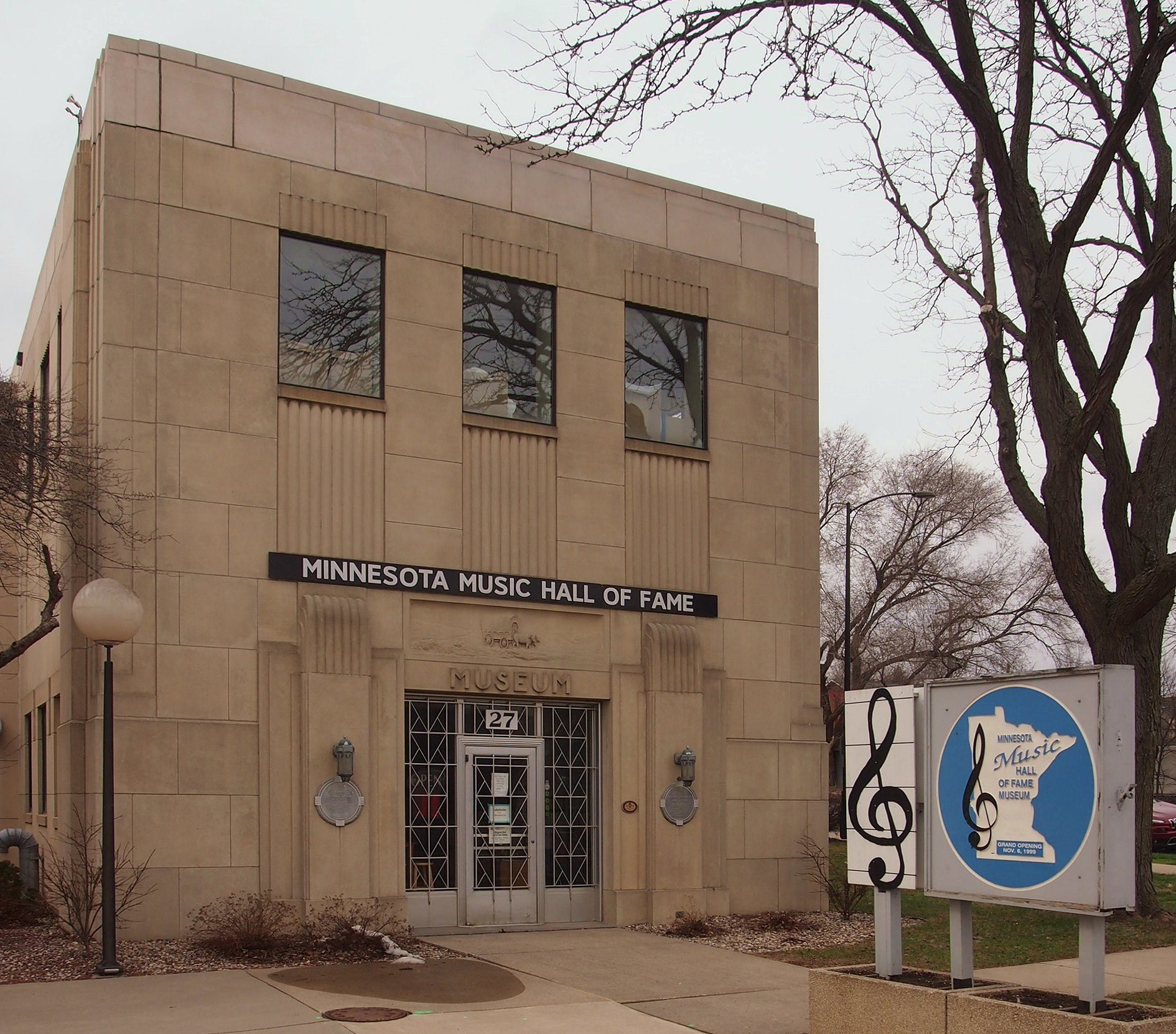
The Minnesota Music Hall of Fame from the east

The Minnesota Music Hall of Fame is located at First North Street and Broadway in New Ulm, Minnesota, United States, in the former public library. It has memorabilia of individual musicians and musical groups, as well as photographs of all who have been inducted. The museum is open during the summer months and by special request during the winter.

Exhibits honor Minnesota music legends like Bob Dylan, Judy Garland, Prince, Eddie Cochran, Bobby Vee, Ervin Wolfe, John Denver, Whoopee John Wilfahrt, Harold Loeffelmacher, Earl Schmidt, Joseph Hofmeister, Wally Pikal and The Andrews Sisters. It also documents local ethnic music, like the popularity of polka music in rural Minnesota.

Each year, new inductees are added at a dinner ceremony in October.

== See also ==
- List of music museums
