= KDUZ =

Radio station in Hutchinson, Minnesota

- Hutchinson, Minnesota; United States
- Frequency: 1260 kHz
- Branding: Classic Hits KDUZ

Programming
- Format: Classic hits
- Affiliations: Westwood One

Ownership
- Owner: Iowa City Broadcasting Company, Inc.
- Sister stations: KARP-FM

History
- First air date: September 16, 1953

Technical information
- Licensing authority: FCC
- Facility ID: 49124
- Class: D
- Power: 1,000 watts (day); 64 watts (night)
- Transmitter coordinates: 44°54′24″N 94°21′59″W
- Translator: 96.5 K243CQ (Hutchinson)

Links
- Public license information: Public file; LMS
- Webcast: Listen live
- Website: ingstadmedia.com/hutchinson

KDUZ (1260 AM) is a radio station licensed to Hutchinson, Minnesota, United States. The station, which began broadcasting in 1953, is currently owned by Iowa City Broadcasting Company, Inc.

KDUZ broadcasts a classic hits format to a ten-county area of southern Minnesota, including western Minneapolis. Local programming includes traffic reports, funeral announcements, local news updates, sports, weather, and a tradio program called "KDUZ Swap Shop". Network newscasts are taken from ABC News, the Minnesota News Network, and the Associated Press.

Weekend programming includes four different Lutheran church services on Sunday morning. Sunday afternoon programming includes Polka Parade with Lester Schuft, Polka-bration hosted by Chuck Thiel, and "It's Polka Time" with Craig Ebel.

== History ==
This station began its licensed broadcast operations on September 16, 1953, serving Hutchinson, Minnesota, with 1,000 watts of power, daytime-only on a frequency of 1260 kHz. The new station was assigned the call sign KDUZ by the Federal Communications Commission.

KDUZ was initially owned by a partnership of brothers Albert Tedesco, Victor Tedesco, and Nicholas Tedesco operating as the McLeod County Broadcasting Company. Ted Hanson served as the station's first program director with Howard Nordine as news director and Albert Tedesco as general manager. In 1955, Heinz Fruck took over the general manager role, a job he held into the 1980s.

In 1957, KDUZ was moved under the ownership of the North American Broadcasting Company, part of the Tedesco Group, under company president Albert S. Tedesco. In 1968, the company launched KDUZ-FM (now KARP-FM) as an FM sister station to KDUZ, duplicating all of its programming and extending the duopoly's reach past the AM's daytime-only restriction.

In February 2000, North American Broadcasting Company, Inc., reached an agreement to sell this station and sister station KKJR (107.1 FM) to Iowa City Broadcasting Company, Inc., for a reported sale price of $2 million. This sale ended the more than 50-year era of radio station ownership for the Tedesco brothers. The deal was approved by the FCC on March 22, 2000, and the transaction was consummated on March 31, 2000. At the time of the sale, KDUZ was playing an oldies music format.

== Awards and honors ==
=== Minnesota AP Broadcasters Awards ===
At the annual Minnesota Associated Press Broadcasters Awards, KDUZ competes in Radio Class 1 against other radio stations with "one or no full-time newsroom employees".

In the awards for 2004, KDUZ received an Honorable Mention in the Sports Reporting category for the "Tiger Football Coaches Show" hosted by Joel Niemeyer and in the Newscast category for the work of news director Mark Wodarczyk. The station's official website, kduz.com, was honored as Best Web Site among stations in Radio Class 1.

In the awards for 2007, KDUZ received an Honorable Mention in the category Best Feature for 2007 Grackle Days by Mark Wodarczyk, in Sports Play-by-play for Crown College Football hosted by Joel Niemeyer, and Best Newscast for KDUZ News hosted by Mark Wodarczyk.

In the awards for 2008, KDUZ received top honors with a win in the Best Newscast category for KDUZ News hosted by Mark Wodarczyk.

=== NAB Marconi Awards ===
In July 2004, John Mons of KDUZ was announced as one of five nominees for the NAB Marconi Radio Award honor from the National Association of Broadcasters in the "Small Market Personality of the Year" category. In July 2007, John Mons of KDUZ was again announced as one of five nominees for that year's "Small Market Personality of the Year" award.

== Station alumni ==
KDUZ founders Albert Tedesco, Victor Tedesco, and Nicholas Tedesco were jointly inducted into the Pavek Museum of Broadcasting Hall of Fame in 2002. They began their careers in radio station ownership on March 15, 1949 with the purchase of WSHB (W-east of Mississippi River, S- Stillwater, H-Hudson, B-Bayport) along with the application to the Federal Communications Commission (FCC), purchased WSHB (licensed originally 1948) with a call letter change request to reflect their first names, WAVN Stillwater (Minnesota) "The Voice Of The Saint Croix Valley" and "We're Always WAViN To You" signed on the air as a 5000 watt non-directional daytimer with 500 watt pre-sunrise authority. (later KLBB). In 1951, the Tedescos purchased WCOW AM, Saint Paul, Minnesota. In 1957 they applied to the FCC for a call letter change to WISK. The three Tedesco brothers sold 63 WISK to Crowell-Collier with a call letter change request in the FCC application to purchase in 1959. The Crowell-Collier owned station signed on the air as "Channel 63, KDWB".

In 1960, the now experienced Tedescos, partnered with Bob Smith of River Falls, Wisconsin along with Zel and Pinky Rice of Sparta, Wisconsin, to build a ground up, WIXK AM, New Richmond, Wisconsin. The 50-year Tedesco radio ownership ended with the sale of KDUZ and its FM sister station in 2000.

KDUZ news director Mark Wodarcyzk was elected to a one-year term as president of the Minnesota Associated Press Broadcasters in March 2008, following his one-year stint as vice president of the organization the previous year.
