= Marisha =

Marisha is a feminine given name. Notable people with this name include:

- Marisha Chamberlain (born 1952), American writer
- Marisha Data (died 1972), Polish-American comedian, singer, and composer
- Marisha Pessl (born 1977), American writer
- Marisha Ray, American voice actress
- Marisha Wallace (born 1985), American-born British actress and writer
