= Gold Star Marching Band =

Marching band of North Dakota State University

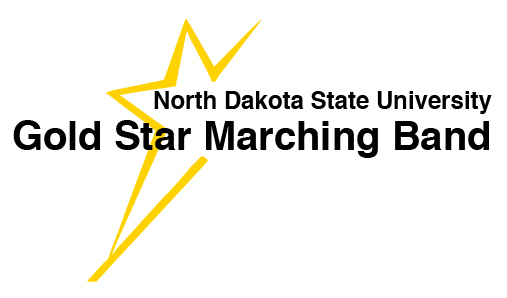
- School: North Dakota State University
- Location: Fargo, ND
- Conference: Mountain West Conference
- Founded: 1902
- Director: Connor Challey
- Members: 170
- Fight song: "On Bison Fight Song (We are the Pride)"
- Website: www.goldstarbands.org

The Gold Star Marching Band, also known as "The Pride of North Dakota", is the marching band of North Dakota State University. It is a non-auditioned band (with the exception of the battery section), open to all majors. With approximately 170 members, the band is one of the largest organizations on campus.

== About the GSMB ==
The GSMB does pregame and halftime performances for the NDSU Bison Football team in the Fargodome. The band usually plays seven shows a year including all football games and sometimes one away game, marches in the homecoming parade, and does a handful of other performances at NDSU and in the Fargo-Moorhead area. The GSMB has also performed at the Minnesota State Fair in 2017, 2018, 2019, 2022, 2024, and 2025, marching in the Sunday parade. The band has also visited Ireland over the years for a trip as well as joining the football team in Frisco, Texas for the FCS National Championship games.

=== Rehearsal ===
The GSMB practices Mondays, Wednesdays, and Fridays from 4:00-5:45pm and Saturday morning rehearsals on game days. When the band can't practice outdoors, they practice inside Festival Concert Hall in the Reineke Fine Arts Center. When the band is outdoors, they practice on Dacotah Field or a soccer practice field on the west side of the outdoor track complex. The GSMB usually does not regularly practice in the Fargodome, only on game day mornings and days when the dome does not have a prior event.

=== Game Day ===
Game Day starts with mandatory section breakfasts at 6 AM. All band members are then present for morning rehearsal at the Fargodome. After morning rehearsal the band has a later call time to be in the atrium of the music building. At call, all sections are accounted for and uniforms inspected. The band then goes outside to start the march over. The march over is a seven or so block parade-style march from Challey Hall, through the heart of NDSU's campus, up to the Fargodome.

Once at the dome, the band performs a pregame show consisting of a field run-on entrance, a fanfare to different sides of the stadium, On Bison while marching down the field, a trio of patriotic songs (Battle Hymn of The Republic, You’re a Grand Old Flag, and America the Beautiful), while forming the shape of a star. The band plays the NDSU alma mater The Yellow and The Green and directly after the song the stadium announcer proclaims "We ARE the Pride of North Dakota!". The band then forms "NDSU" while playing Fight Song and forms a snorting bison. The band marches towards the team entrance, forms a tunnel for the team to run out, and plays On Bison as the team runs out. When the lights come back on, the band plays the Star-Spangled Banner, and exits the field by the opposing team's locker room.

The band stands in the south end-zone directly next to the student section(s). The band then performs a show at halftime, and returns to the stands for the conclusion of the game.

== Instrumentation ==
The Gold Star Marching Band (GSMB) currently includes:

- 4 Drum Majors
- Baton Twirlers
- Piccolos
- Clarinets
- Alto Saxophones
- Tenor Saxophones
- Mellophones
- Trumpets
- Trombones
- Baritones
- Sousaphones
- Cymbals
- Snare Drums
- Tenor Drums
- Tom Drums
- Bass Drums
- Front Ensemble
- Color Guard

== History ==
The Gold Star Band owes much of its existence to a personal tragedy. In Spring 1903, Clarence Simeon Putnam, a local Fargo doctor, watched his downtown Fargo medical practice burn to the ground - five days after his insurance had lapsed. Essentially out of a job, Putnam landed a position teaching math at North Dakota Agricultural College (now known as North Dakota State University). While the next set of events is not entirely clear, a need arose for leadership of NDAC's ROTC band. Putnam, a cornetist, found himself in charge of 14 members known as the "Cadet Band" on April 14, 1903.

While the band regards the first full year of Doc Putnam's association with the band (1904) as its "birthday", student newspaper references indicate a band existed as early as 1901. In fall 1902, Claude Nugent, Secretary of the college, and Harry M. Rudd, a local musician, purchased instruments from a local farmer with the intention of creating an NDAC band. Rudd directed the band in some capacity until April 1903 when C.S. Putnam took over.

Putnam's leadership was quite dynamic and the band thrived under his direction. This peaked in 1923-24 when the band, as an ROTC unit, earned its third consecutive 100 percent inspection rating, which entitled it to a presidential citation and a "Gold Star" rating. Putnam incorporated the moniker into the band's name and the Gold Star Band was born. Following Putnam's death in 1944, the band's numbers deteriorated until former Gold Star Band member William Euren became director in 1948. Euren restored the band's pre-war numbers and worked toward expanding its persona beyond its military role.

Euren retired in 1968 and Roger Sorenson became Director of Bands for two years before leaving in 1970. During his brief tenure, Sorenson engendered a level of lasting loyalty among alumni who performed under his direction. Orville Eidem arrived in 1970 and was Director of Bands for the next 23 years. Besides the perpetuation of the marching band tradition, Eidem also had a great love of jazz and expanded the scope of NDSU's program. The band also played a role in lobbying efforts for a new facility. Reineke Fine Arts Center replaced Putnam Hall and the old Festival Hall in 1981.

Several other names have been associated with the band. While C.S. Putnam was away from the band in 1914-17, Harold Bachman and B.A. Orr were directors. Edward D. Schroepfer directed the band following Putnam's death. Roy Johnson also played a significant role in the band's musical leadership during the Sorenson years.

Orville Eidem retired in 1993, at which time Wayne F. Dorothy became the new director. Dorothy was previously Assistant Director of Bands under Eidem. Then in 1999, Dorothy retired and was replaced by Warren Olfert as Director of Bands.

2007 was a year for changes when Dr. Sigurd Johnson was hired as the newly-created Director of Athletic Bands, leading the marching band and the pep band. For the 2008 season, the band received new uniforms, recovered gold drums, and the addition of a front ensemble. The GSMB grew significantly under Dr. Johnson's direction, seeing bands of close to or above 200 members many times in his 14 years with the band. In 2021, Sigurd Johnson stepped down and Connor Challey took over in 2022 as Director of Athletic Bands after serving as the Assistant Director of Athletic Bands for the past 4 seasons.

== Traditions ==
=== March Over ===
The march over is a parade-like march through the NDSU campus. It starts from the music building, up Albrecht Boulevard through campus, and around the front entrance to the Fargodome. Once at the dome, the band will split into two bands and performs for tailgaters in the west dome lot, and for fans close to the Fargodome entrance. The band joins together and enters in the Fargodome at the loading dock entrance on the north side of the dome and does a quiet march into the dome before playing a full strength once they are at the field. The march over is known for its various hijinks including chants, random follow the leader, section swapping of instruments, and dances. Stop-sign slapping used to be a common tradition of march over, however this has been discontinued due to safety concern.

In the past there used to be a night march over every year in which the band would wear glow sticks and lights in the twilight of a fall game night.

=== Victory Polka ===
After a Bison victory in a football, basketball, or volleyball game; the band performs the traditional playing and singing of the GSMB verses of "In Heaven there is no Beer". This stirred up controversy after the 2016 victory against the Iowa Hawkeyes, who also uses the song in football victories. Various rumors spread across social media accusing NDSU of mocking Iowa's defeat.

=== The Yellow and the Green ===
Every time the Gold Star Marching Band has a group meal together, the President of the band or one of the current drum majors will ask the band to stand and sing the NDSU alma mater, The Yellow and The Green. Rookies are required to learn the SATB parts quickly, because they will have to sing it by themselves at the ending band banquet.

=== Band Banquet and Concert ===
The band always holds a band banquet towards the end of the year fort the graduating/exiting members. Different awards are given out such as; Section of the Year, One Star of the Year, Gold Star of the Year, Silver Stars of the Year, and section awards like the green trumpet (member to member), the grumpet (for the most deserving one star), the white and green trombone (for the most deserving rookie), the black trombone (member to member), or the blue saxophone (member to member) in honor of a band member that perished in a car crash in early 2017. New section awards are being made more recently, such as the green piccolo, or the duck.

Other awards given at the banquet are meant as more humorous than the above, and include the likes of tongue-in-cheek superlatives "Back in High School", "Wolf in Sheep's Clothing", "Sheep in Wolf's Clothing", "Please Be Quiet" (for those who are), and "No SERIOUSLY be QUIET" (for those who aren't).

The band also performs the Sounds of the Gridiron concert at the end of the season. All of the halftime shows, the pregame, and some of the stands music are all performed.

== Pictures ==
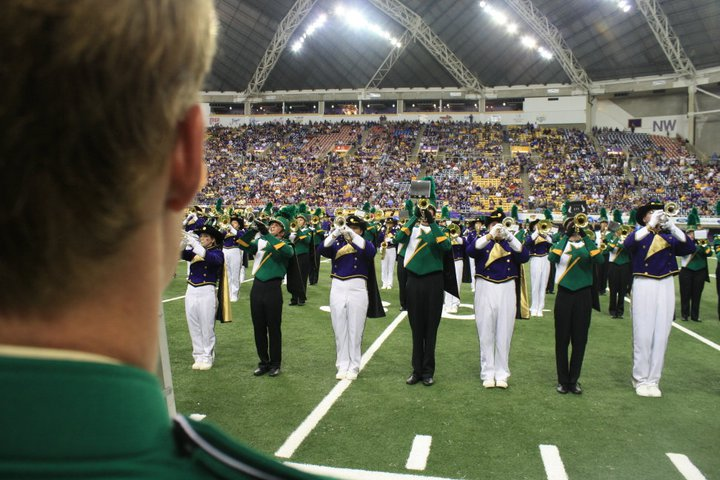
2010 GSMB performing with the Panther Marching Band at UNI

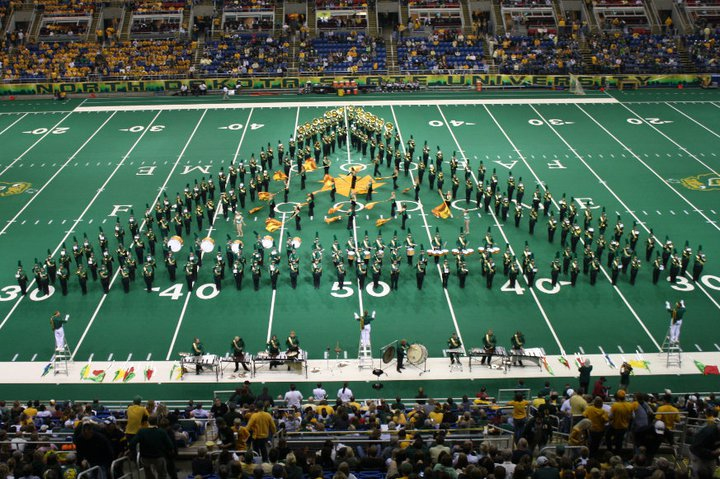
2010 GSMB performing at halftime

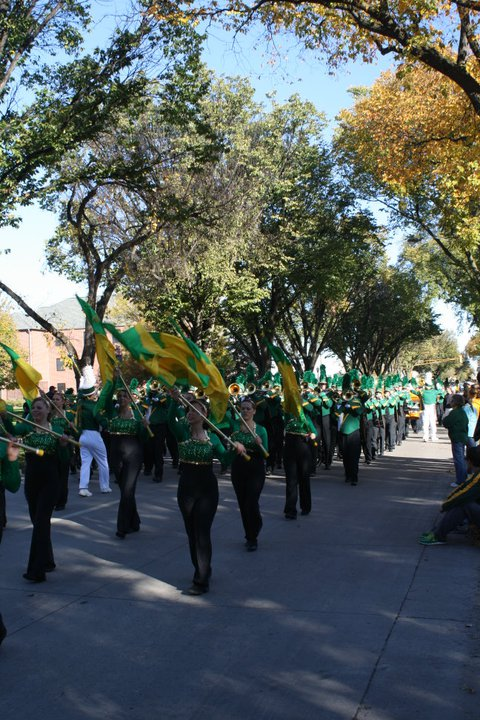
2010 Color Guard on Homecoming

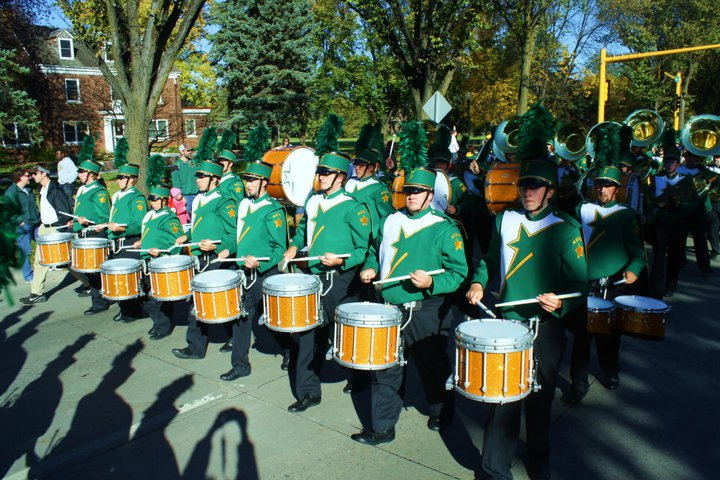
2010 GSMB Drumline on Homecoming

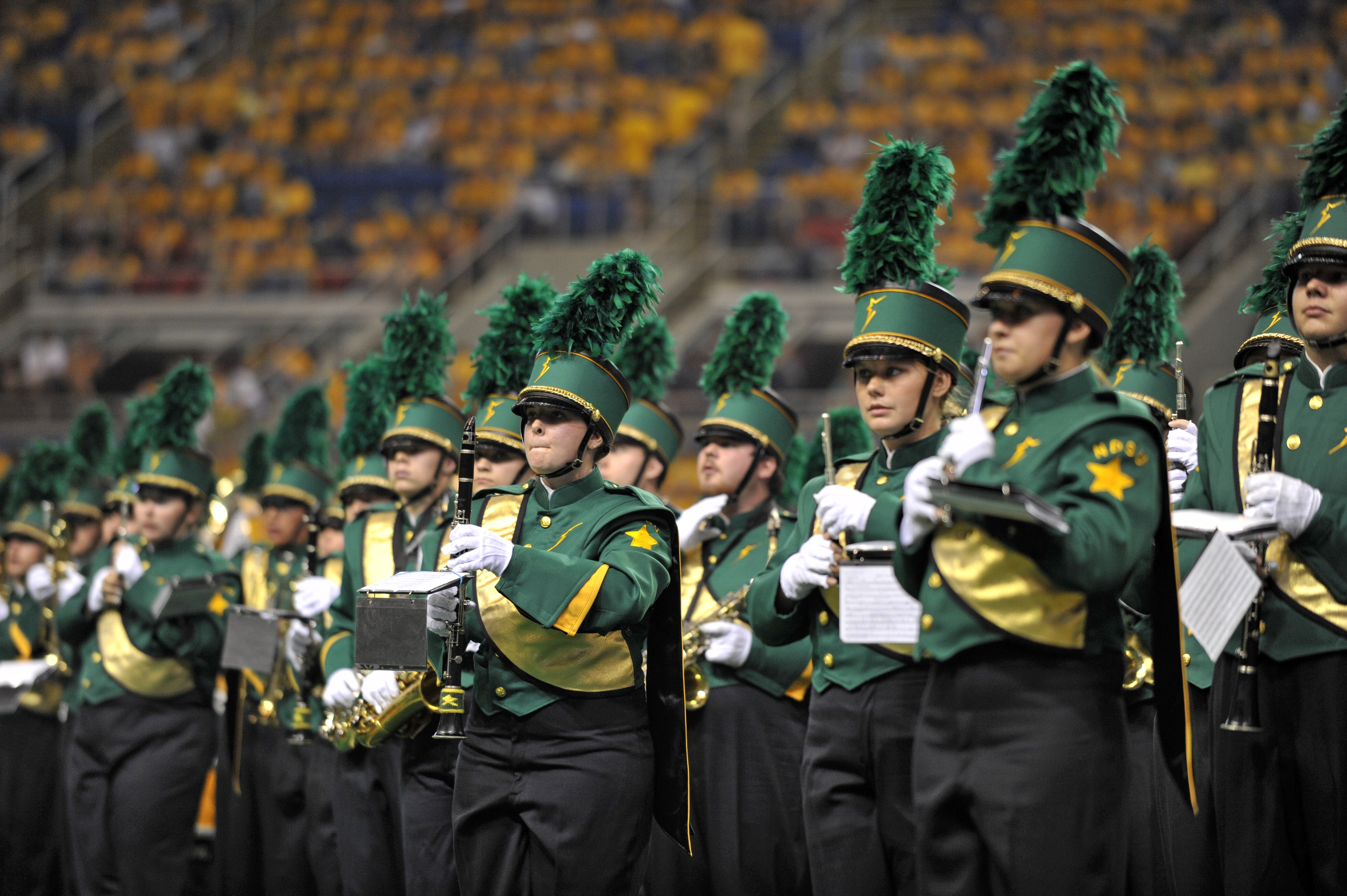
2009 GSMB performing in the Fargodome

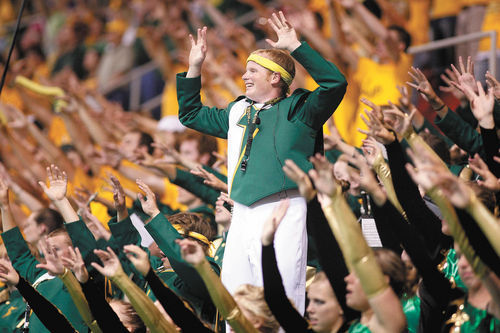
Drum Major Dan Hinman with the crowd in 2008

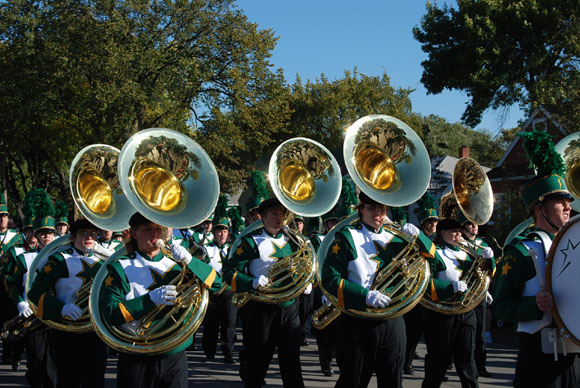
Sousaphones marching in the 2008 Homecoming Parade

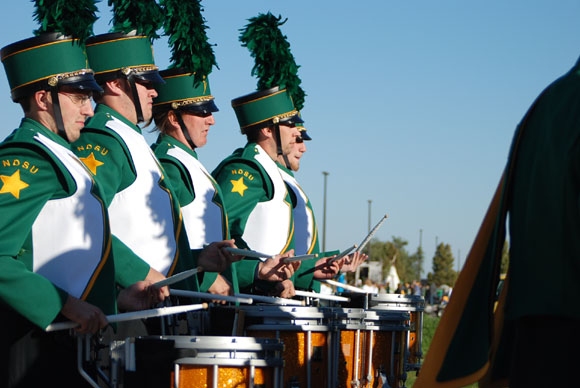
2008 Snares marching in the Homecoming Parade

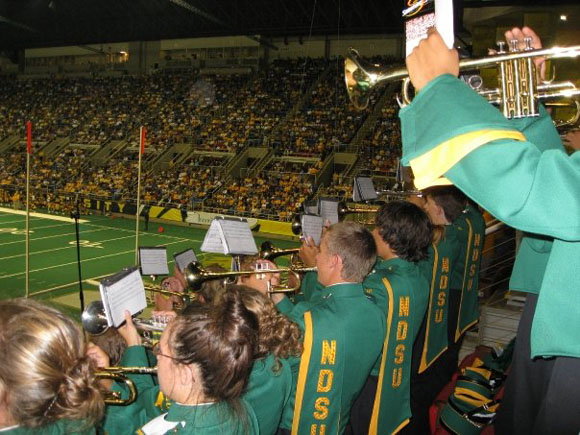
2008 GSMB performing in the stands at the Fargodome

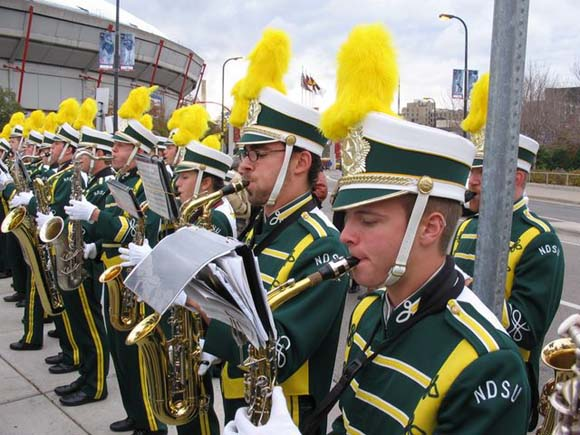
NDSU at 2006 Minnesota football game

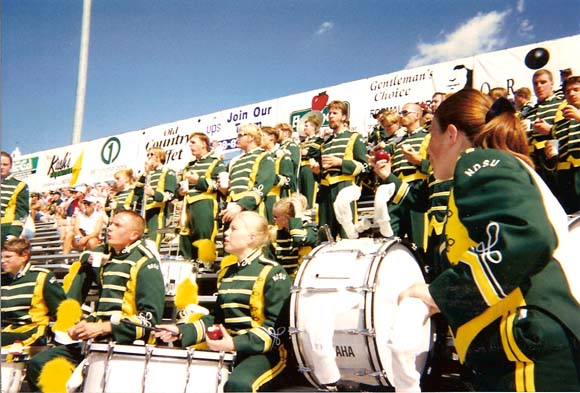
NDSU at UNO football game in the 90s

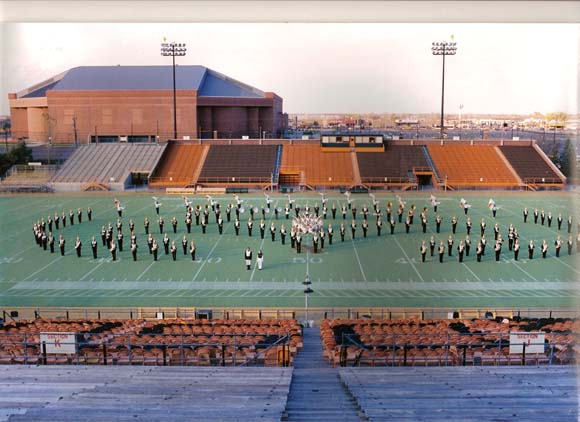
GSMB on Dacotah Field with the Fargodome in the Background
