= In Heaven There Is No Beer =

Polka song

"Im Himmel gibt's kein Bier"

Song
- Language: German
- English title: "In Heaven There is No Beer"
- Published: 1956
- Genre: Drinking song
- Composer: Ralph Maria Siegel
- Lyricist: Ernst Neubach

"In Heaven There is No Beer" is a polka song about the existential pleasures of beer drinking. The title of the song implies a reason for drinking beer while you are still alive. The song in German is "Im Himmel gibt's kein Bier", in Spanish, "En El Cielo No Hay Cerveza". It was originally composed as a movie score for the film Die Fischerin vom Bodensee, 1956, by Ernst Neubach and Ralph Maria Siegel. The English lyrics are credited to Art Walunas.

The song was the inspiration for the title of the 1984 film and 1985 Sundance Film Festival winner, In Heaven There Is No Beer?, which also featured the song "Who Stole the Kishka?"

A version of the song by the Amherst, Massachusetts, band Clean Living became a hit in 1972 (US Billboard #49, Cash Box #34; Canada #51, New Zealand #16).

The song is often played by college marching bands, most notably the Iowa Hawkeye Marching Band where it is known as the Hawkeye Victory Polka, and also Western Thunder Marching Band at the University of Wyoming, where it is called "The Beer Song." Students will chant "Beer Song" at home games until the band plays the song. The song is also played by North Dakota State University's Gold Star Marching Band following a Bison win in football games.
