= Walt Solek =

American polka musician

Walter Solek
- Born: September 28, 1910
- Died: April 1, 2005 (aged 94)
- Other name: Clown Prince of Polka
- Occupation: musician
- Known for: English-language polka lyrics
- Spouse: Marilyn
- Children: Joe, Tom, Anita

Walter Solek or Walt Solek (September 28, 1910 – April 1, 2005) was a Polish-American lyricist, musician, performer, and radio show host who introduced English-language lyrics into polka music in the United States. Solek was known as the "Clown Prince of Polka".

Solek was honored by the International Polka Association, the Polka Hall of Fame in Chicago, he is a Meriden Hall of Fame member, and "the first sailor in 1940 who could sing Anchors Aweigh in Polish". He hosted the Polka Show on WMMW radio for 28 years starting in 1947, and had a 75-year music career.

== Early career ==
Solek's first break was with the Krakowska Orchestra organized by his brother Henry, with which he recorded on the RCA Victor label. In 1939 he organized his own polka band before being called up for military service in 1940 to serve in the United States Navy. After World War II, his song "Julida Polka" was one of his earliest hits on Columbia Records.

"The hit vaulted him right to the top of the polka world." The band was booked into dance halls all over the eastern states, billed as the "Polish Spike Jones". His success continued with other hits including "Coal Miners Polka," "Pierogi Polka," "Green Parrot," and "They’re Always In The Way." The polka business fell on hard times in the 1950s and his band made the switch to cutting records with English lyrics. During this period he released the hit song "Who Stole The Keeshka". He spent 35 years in the music business recording with Columbia Records, Harmonia, Dana, Reprise, Starr, and Rex Records.

== Popularity ==
"When asked about the greatest places he ever appeared, he replied that the band drew their biggest crowds at Lakeside and Lakewood Ballrooms in Barnesville, Pennsylvania numbering over 3,000,000 polka lovers." The emergence of Rock and Roll music provided tough competition, and Solek suggested disc jockeys who run polka programs play more tunes with English lyrics. He was a DJ at WMMW in Meriden, Connecticut starting in 1947.

He was known for his exuberant performances and unusual outfits, and he was not bothered by criticism deriding the polka music form. "He was a musician, a showman, an actor, and an entertainer." When he was home, Walt lived with his wife, Marilyn, and son, Joe, the drummer in his orchestra, son Tom and daughter Anita.

Solek's popularity was helped by his ability to effectively mix comedy and polka together. His song "Who Stole the Kishka?" (originally spelled Keeshka) has been a popular party tune since it was recorded in the 1950s with English lyrics. The song was also a hit for the Matys Brothers who recorded it in 1963, and has been performed regularly by other bands and remains a cult classic. His 1981 recording of "Ta-ra-ra Boom-de-ay" or "We Don't Have Any Money (but We Have a Lot of Fun)" was also popular.

His motto was "Bringing people together through music!". He played polka music during a time when polka was considered un-cool, competing with Elvis Presley and The Beatles, but "he knew how to have a good time and he also knew how to make people laugh and forget their worries for a while."

Solek was inducted into the International Polka Association Hall of Fame in 1974. He was a parishioner of St. Stanislaus Church.

== Death ==
He died on April 1, 2005, at the age of 94.

== Songs ==
- "Almighty Dollar Polka"
- "Bartender Polka"
- "Blondie Polka"
- "Coal Miners Polka"
- "Drunkers Lament"
- "Girl From Chicago Polka"
- "Green Parrot"
- "Happy Weekend Polka"
- "Have Another, Brother Waltz"
- "I Don't Want To Go Home Polka"
- "In A Dark Cellar Waltz"
- "Iron Casket Oberek"
- "Jolly Farmer Polka"
- "Julianna Polka"
- "Mama Told Me Polka"
- "Na Debowym Moscie" (on the Oak Bridge)
- "Oh Mama Mama Polka"
- "Peddler Polka"
- "Pierogi Polka"
- "Poor Old Man Oberek"
- "Stealing Chickens Polka"
- "They're Always In The Way"
- "Under The Star Polka"
- "Where Can She Be? Waltz"
- "Wedding Dress Polka"
- "Whoop Dee Doo"
- "Who Stole the Kishka?"
- "Young Bachelor Polka"
