= Dana Records =

- Founded: 1945
- Status: Defunct
- Genre: Polish, polka, pop
- Country of origin: United States
- Location: New York City

Dana Records was an American record label for Polish and polka music. Founded by Walter Dana in New York 1945, it was a significant player in the United States' recorded music market for a few years mid-century, its most successful year being 1952.

== History ==
From its start, the label was about Polish music but focused on the polka genre. "The polka, to me, has a very powerful dance rhythm. It makes people feel happy, and I like to see people happy," Walter Dana said. Dana transformed the Eastern European polka by increasing the tempo, and adding trumpet and saxophone sections to the traditional instrumentation set. This was the label's way of appealing to both traditional ethnic audiences and broadening its appeal to new listeners.

In 1948 the label had a huge success with Helen Polka, causing pick up from distributors, and giving the label financial stability to enter into the pop and Latin American markets. Fall of 1948, the label significantly expanded its catalog when it acquired Syrena Records' catalog from Wlodziemierz Falencki, who shipped large numbers of Syrena masters from Poland due to expectations of a war.

All of the label's releases had been in the 78 rpm format until 1949, when they issued their first LP record. As major labels started losing interest in ethnic music, the label was still able to add several top bands to its roster. Walt Solek, previously signed to Columbia and Victor, made a huge hit with "Who Stole the Kishka?" which appealed to Polish-American audiences and the general public.

1952 can be seen as the label's biggest year. A poll by Billboard ranked it third for income among all record labels, above labels such as Capitol and Decca. Then, Coral Records took up distributing the label in the Chicago area. Dana felt its brand was generally well-enough recognized that they dropped the Broadway imprint and began also using the Dana label for pop releases.

In 1954, Walter Dana sold Dana Records to Jerry Blaine, which brought a complete overhaul of the label's distribution. However, Dana remained president of the label for a time after the sale. The fast-tempo of the east-coast polka style did not connect well with mid-western audiences. To gain a share of that geographical market, Dana connected with Alvin Sajewski to help the label get Chicago talent. Recording sessions took place in Chicago, but Walter Dana continued to supervise the sessions, often re-arranging the music to fit the abilities and talent of the musicians in the studio. Dana's sales percentage of 78 rpm records was stronger than the industry's average. It was not until 1957 that sales of 45 rpm discs equaled that of the 78s. Dana started pressing the 78 rpm discs in vinyl, similar to the 45's, but switched back to selling the 78 rpm format in shellac because of dealers' demands.

In July 1959, Jerry Blaine's company moved its headquarters to a new building on West 47th Street in New York, along with its now sister companies Jubilee and Josie. After Walter Dana quit the company for "overextension," Dana Records was operated as a division of Fiesta Recorsd. In 1961, Dana Records' Frank Wojnarowski's Matka had a million-selling record. Wojnarowski had been with the label since the early days of the company and helped popularize the east-coast polka sound which appealed to their target audience. However, Matka was more of a hit among the Polish-American audience, making its gold record certification unusual. By 1988, Dana Records moved their offices to Miami Beach, Florida.

Dana used unusual marketing techniques, common in other smaller labels, including partnering with Manischewitz Wine Company, naming one of their songs "Wine Polka," and supplying DJs with bottles.

== Influence ==
The label became the top Polish label in America. Many polka songs were recorded by the label prior to their publication. It was Dana's power that made deals with publishing companies giving rights of refusal to songs. Dana was instrumental in popularizing the "big band," also called "east-coast" sound, of American polka music and of musicians who developed the sound and "dominated" the 1940s polka market. Jimmy Sturr has stated the label's output was a significant influence, and that there's not one Dana record he doesn't have."

Dana's output was by no means limited to polka and pop music. Dana also ranged from the "serious" music of Chór Dana, Staś Jaworski, and the Syrena catalog to the comedy skits of Marisha Data.

== Artists ==
- Steve Adamczyk
- Ray Bloch
- John Bomba
- Chór Dana
- Larry Clinton
- Marisha Data
- Sam Donahue
- Ray Henry
- Staś Jaworski
- Regina Kujawa
- Steve Maksymowicz
- Johnny Pecon
- The Polkateers
- Walt Solek
- Gene Wisniewski
- Bernie Witkowski
- Frank Wojnarowski
- Eddie Zima

== Bibliography ==
- Greene, Victor (1992). A Passion for Polka: Old-Time Ethnic Music in America. University of California Press. ISBN 0-520-07584-6.
