= Władysław Daniłowski =

Polish–American pianist, composer and singer

- Born: Władysław Daniłowski; April 26, 1902; Warsaw, Poland
- Died: March 4, 2000 (aged 97); Miami Beach, United States
- Citizenship: Polish, American
- Education: Warsaw Conservatory; University of Warsaw
- Occupations: composer, diplomat
- Years active: 1928–1960
- Employer: Dana Records
- Known for: Chór Dana
- Spouse: Niusia Nobisowna
- Children: Gustav

Władysław Daniłowski (also known by his pseudonyms Władysław Dan and Walter Dana, April 26, 1902 – March 4, 2000) was a Polish and American pianist, composer and singer. A pioneer of jazz and tango in Poland, in the United States he is best known as a promoter of polka music. He wrote the score for the first Polish sound film.

== Life and career ==
Born April 26, 1902, in Warsaw, then in the Russian-held Congress Poland, to a renowned Polish writer and revolutionary Gustaw Daniłowski. In 1919 he joined the Polish Army and served with distinction during the Polish-Bolshevist War. Following demobilisation he started studies at the Warsaw Conservatory. He studied piano under tutelage of Henryk Melcer-Szczawiński and theory of music in the class of Piotr Rytel. In 1926 he also graduated from the law faculty of the University of Warsaw.

In late 1920s Daniłowski spent two years working for the Polish embassy in Paris, where he fell in love with jazz and tango, two styles of music gaining increasing popularity in Europe at that time. Upon his return to Poland he started composing for the Qui Pro Quo cabaret. Numerous songs written for the star of the cabaret, Hanka Ordonówna, gained him much fame in Warsaw and then in the entire country. Also in 1928 he founded a Chór Dana (Dan's Choir), modelled after The Revelers. In 1929 he also formed an Argentinian Choir V. Dana which helped popularise tango in Poland, to the extent that already by the start of the 1930s it started to be considered a part of Warsaw's folklore.

His music gained him much fame in 1930s Poland and he became one of the most popular composers of the time. His songs were sung by many of the most notable vocalists of the epoch, including Adam Aston, Mieczysław Fogg, Zofia Terné and Mira Zimińska-Sygietyńska, to name but a few. In 1930 he also wrote the score for the first Polish sound film, the Moralność Pani Dulskiej. He later wrote scores for numerous other films, including Dziesięciu z Pawiaka (1931), Dvanáct křesel (1933), Wacuś (1935) and Dodek na froncie (1936). The lyrics for his songs were written by some of the most renowned Polish authors of the time, including Julian Tuwim, Marian Hemar, Konrad Tom and Jerzy Jurandot. Until 1939 he was also the head of the Popular Music Department of the Polish Radio, at the same time he continued a successful diplomatic career for the Polish Ministry of Foreign Affairs.

Following the outbreak of World War II Daniłowski moved to Italy and then in 1940 to the United States. There he re-activated his Dana Choir under a new name (Dana Ensemble) and adopted a new pseudonym – Walter Dana. He worked as a speaker for numerous Polish-language radio stations and signed contracts with Harmonia and RCA Victor record companies. In the 1940s he also founded his own label, Dana Records. In hid capacity of record company executive, promoter, and publisher, he was largely responsible for the "big-band" sound of polka music that became pre-eminent in the America. Jimmy Sturr states that "He started what is known today as polka music, it's as simple as that," In 1958 he moved to Miami Beach. Later in his life he transitioned to a composer of classical music. He died March 4, 2000, and was buried in the Southern Memorial Park.

== Works ==
- "Longing for You" – A song written in 1951 and sung by artists such as Vic Damone, Theresa Brewer, Ethel Smith, Sammy Kaye, Billy Cotton.
- Who Stole the Kishka?
- Wiem (Po co serce łudzić) on YouTube with Chór Dana
- Co nam zostało z tych lat (What's left to us from those years?) on YouTube performed by Chór Wiehlera, lyricist Julian Tuwim under pseudonym "Oldlen."

== Honors and awards ==
- Polish Gold Cross of Merit from President Ignacy Mościcki
- Royal Diamond Pin with Crown from Italy's Queen.
- Member of the Polka Hall of Fame.
