= On Bison =

Fight song of North Dakota State University

On Bison is a fight song of North Dakota State University in Fargo, North Dakota.

== Lyrics ==
On Bison carry the fight
State is backing you
Green and yellow colors bright
To them, we will be true
STATE BISON!
Fight them right back to their goal
A victory for our name
On you Bison
FIGHT YOU BISON!!
Stampede and win this game!
