= Marisha Data =

Polish-American singer and comedian

Marisha Data performing as Aggie Klepaczka on a Dana Records 78rpm phonograph record

Marisha Data (died October 12, 1972) was a Polish-American comedian, singer, and composer. She was a successful performer for both English and Polish audiences. Her career encompassed numerous genres, ranging from serious opera to polka to vaudeville. Her comic performances were often in the character of Aggie Klepaczka.

== Biography ==
She was an early performer on television, performing to pleasant reviews on WBKB in Chicago. In 1948 she was performing Il Trovatore while touring with the Chicago Opera Artists Association, in the role of Azucena. Here her voice was reviewed as “big, warm, dramatic”. The next year she was with the “Grand Opera Company of New York” performing in the opera Taras Bulba. The opera itself received a scathing review, but Data was again praised as someone who could “make a poor aria sound like a fairly good one”.

Signed to Capitol, in 1950 she was releasing material in English on their regular pop series, and in Polish for the ethnic series. She then signed to Dana Records in 1952, and in quick secession a recording session took place in Chicago and several sides, performed In Polish, were released. Capitol Records released material by Data as part of their 1957 “Capitol of the World” campaign.

In addition to her singing, she was a radio announcer, most commonly associated with WHFC, Chicago. One of her U.S. War Bond drives netted in excess of 1 million dollars. She was also a character actor, specializing in comic personalities. In the character of "Aggie Klepaczka" she performed comic skits in both Polish and English, over a period that lasted from the early 1950s until the 1960s.

Marisha Data died on October 12, 1972.

== Legacy ==
In 1974 she became, posthumously, the first woman to be inducted into the Polka Music Hall of Fame.

Data remained popular among Polish and polka audiences long after her death. Richie Drongoski in 1992 included her name in his song with lyrical content similar to Rock and Roll Heaven but switched to Polka. Similarly, Lenny Gomulka, in Polish via litania form, canonizes Data among polka luminaries in his song ‘’Where Were You Back Then Polka’’.
