= The Yellow and The Green =

"The Yellow and The Green'" is the Alma Mater of North Dakota State University in Fargo, North Dakota. "The Yellow and The Green" was written by a young North Dakota Agricultural College (now known as North Dakota State University) faculty member, Archibald E. Minard, in 1907. Minard later took the lyrics to Dr. Clarence S. Putnam, a fellow NDAC professor, to develop a musical setting for the lyrics. Minard hoped that the song would become the official song of the state of North Dakota. Instead, that designation went to another song for which Putnam composed the music, the "North Dakota Hymn".

On February 24, 2016, Dean Bresciani, the president of NDSU, asked the academic community to remove all but the first stanza and to create a committee to study the song and find an appropriate compromise. This was due to a complaint about cultural and ethnic references in the third stanza.

== Lyrics ==
Lyrics composed in 1908

Ho! a cheer for Green and Yellow,
Up with Yellow and the Green;
They’re the shades that deck our prairies
Far and wide with glorious sheen,
Fields of waving green in springtime,
Golden yellow in the fall—
How the great high-arching heaven
Looks and laughs upon it all!

Here in autumn throng the nations,
Just to gather in the spoil,
Throng on freight-cars from the cities,
Some to feast and some to toil,
Then the yellow grain flows eastward
And the yellow gold flows back;
Barren cities boast their plenty
And the prairies know no lack.

Hushed upon the boundless prairies
Is the bison’s thund’ring tread,
And the red man passes with him
On his spoilers’ bounty fed.
But the Norse, the Celt and Saxon
With their herd increase, and find
Mid these fields of green and yellow
Plenty e’en for all mankind.

Ho! a cheer for Green and Yellow,
Up with Yellow and the Green;
They’re the shades that deck our prairies
Far and wide with glorious sheen,
Fields of waving green in springtime,
Golden yellow in the fall—
How the great high-arching heaven
Looks and laughs upon it all!
