= North Dakota State University =

Public university in Fargo, North Dakota, US

- North Dakota State University of Agriculture and Applied Sciences
- Former name: North Dakota Agricultural College (1890–1960)
- Type: Public land-grant research university
- Established: 1890; 136 years ago
- Parent institution: North Dakota University System
- Accreditation: HLC
- Endowment: $528 million (2025)
- President: Marshall Stewart
- Provost: Shari Veil
- Students: 11,952 (fall 2024)
- Location: Fargo, North Dakota, United States; 46°53′30″N 96°48′00″W
- Campus: Urban – Fargo Campus: 258 acres (1.04 km^{2})
- Colors: Green and yellow
- Nickname: Bison ("Thundering Herd")
- Sporting affiliations: NCAA Division I Summit League; Mountain West Conference
- Mascot: Thundar
- Website: ndsu.edu

North Dakota State University (NDSU, formally North Dakota State University of Agriculture and Applied Sciences) is a public land-grant research university in Fargo, North Dakota, United States. It was founded as North Dakota Agricultural College in 1890 as the state's land-grant university. It is classified among "R1-Doctoral Universities – Very high research activity".

NDSU is part of the North Dakota University System. The university also operates North Dakota's agricultural research extension centers distributed across the state on 18,488 acres (74.82 km^{2}). In 2015, NDSU's annual economic impact on the state and region was estimated to be $1.3 billion by the NDUS Systemwide Economic Study by the School of Economics at North Dakota State University. As of 2024, it was also North Dakota's fourth-largest employer.

== History ==
=== 19th century ===
The bill founding North Dakota Agricultural College (NDAC) was signed on March 8, 1890, one year after North Dakota became a state and seven years after initial plans to start an agricultural college in northern Dakota Territory. NDAC was established as North Dakota's land-grant institution.

On October 15, 1890, Horace E. Stockbridge became the first NDAC president and the board of trustees was formed. Classes were initially held in six classrooms rented from Fargo College. The first class of students was admitted on September 8, 1891. College Hall (Old Main) was completed in 1892 and was the first building on campus.

=== 20th century ===
In 1908, the school's alma mater "The Yellow and The Green" was written and a year later the school's official colors, Yellow and Green, were selected. In 2015 a change was made where only the first verse of the alma mater is recognized by the university, due to ethnic references in the third stanza.

NDAC continued to grow and was renamed North Dakota State University on November 8, 1960, after a statewide referendum. The name change reflected the institution's increasing field of study breadth.

A 36-acre (15 ha) area including 12 historic buildings was listed on the National Register of Historic Places as North Dakota State University District in 1986.

=== 21st century ===
Around the start of the 21st century, NDSU began a phase of growth.

NDSU surpassed 10,000 students for the first time in 2000, and by 2009, its enrollment was 14,189. Enrollment in 2018 stood at 13,650.

Research, athletic programs, and campus facilities benefited from increases in student enrollment. Between 2000 and 2007, NDSU added a number of undergraduate programs and 31 graduate programs. Several buildings have been built or expanded and remodeled over the past seven years, including the Wallman Wellness Center, Memorial Union, and the College of Business.

In 2004, all athletic programs moved to Division I.

In 2023, President David Cook outlined plans to merge two of the seven colleges into five in an attempt to save $7.6 million. This also resulted in the elimination of some majors with high program costs and low enrollment. There are plans to create new majors to meet future workforce needs.

Enrollment has fallen from a high of 14,747 in 2014 to 11,952 in 2023. It was stagnant at 11,952 for the years 2023-2025. Enrollment fell once again in 2026 to 11,609, which bring enrollment back down to the 2003 level

== Campuses ==
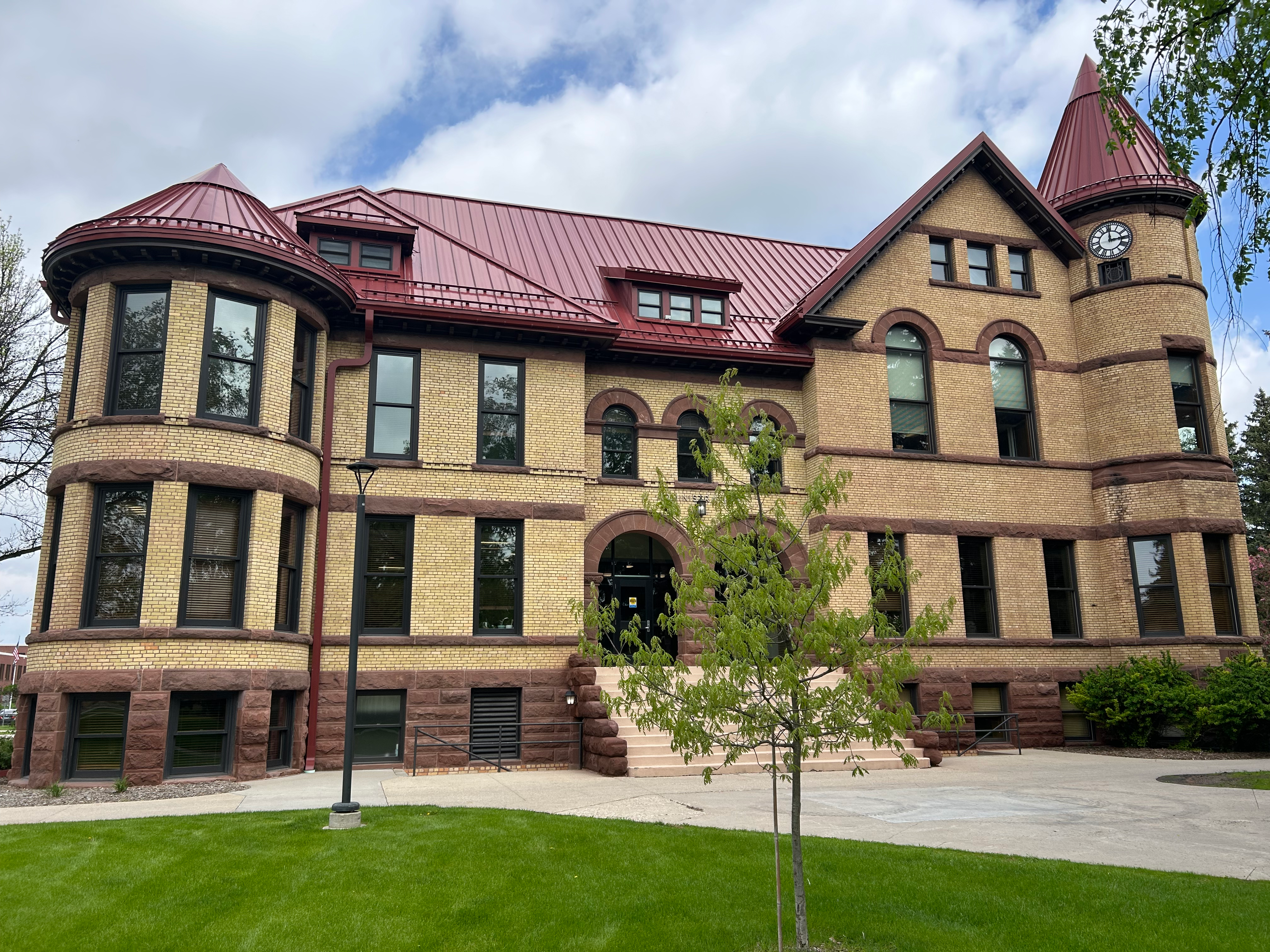
Old Main at NDSU.

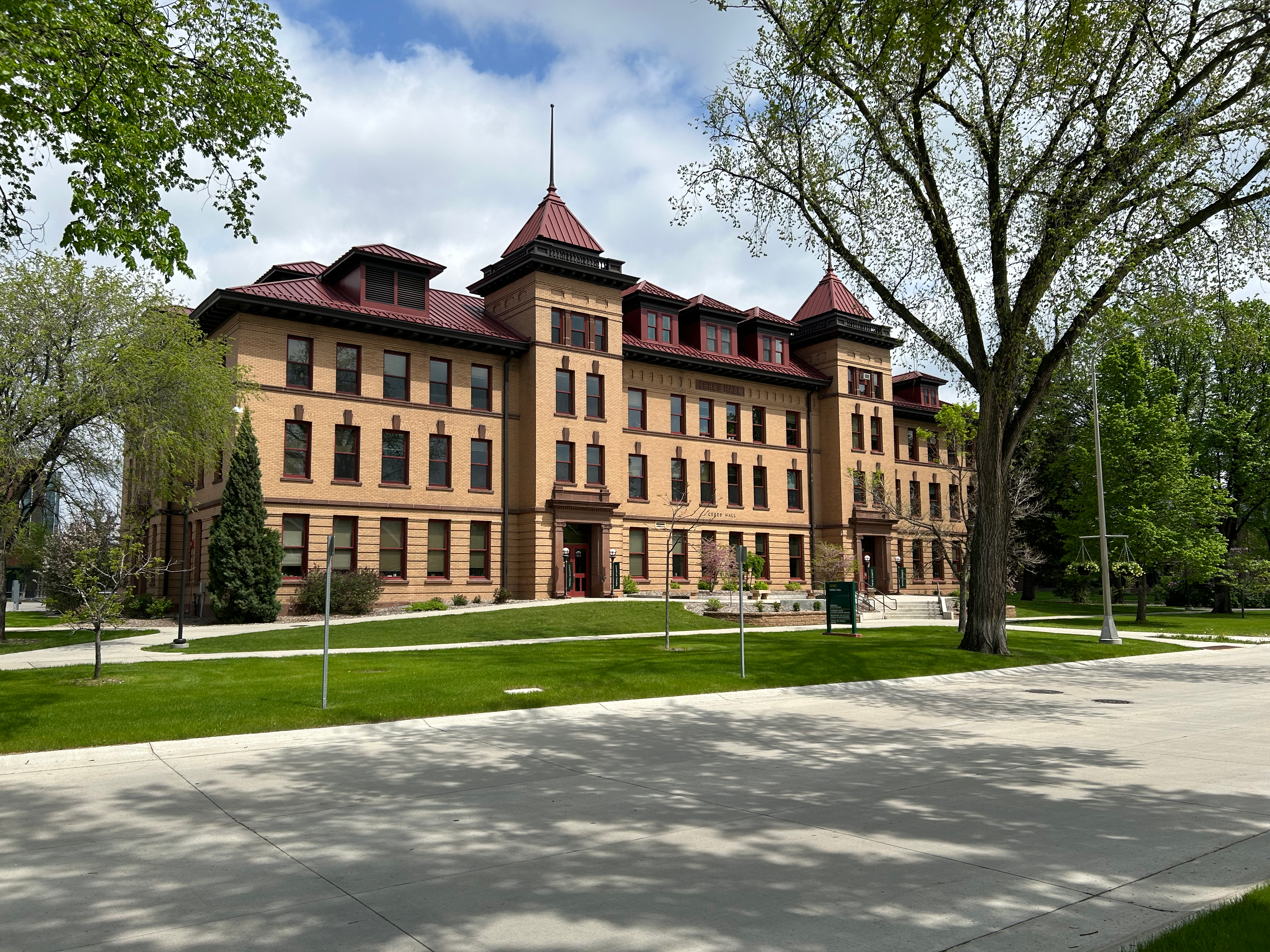
Ceres Hall on the southern area of campus.

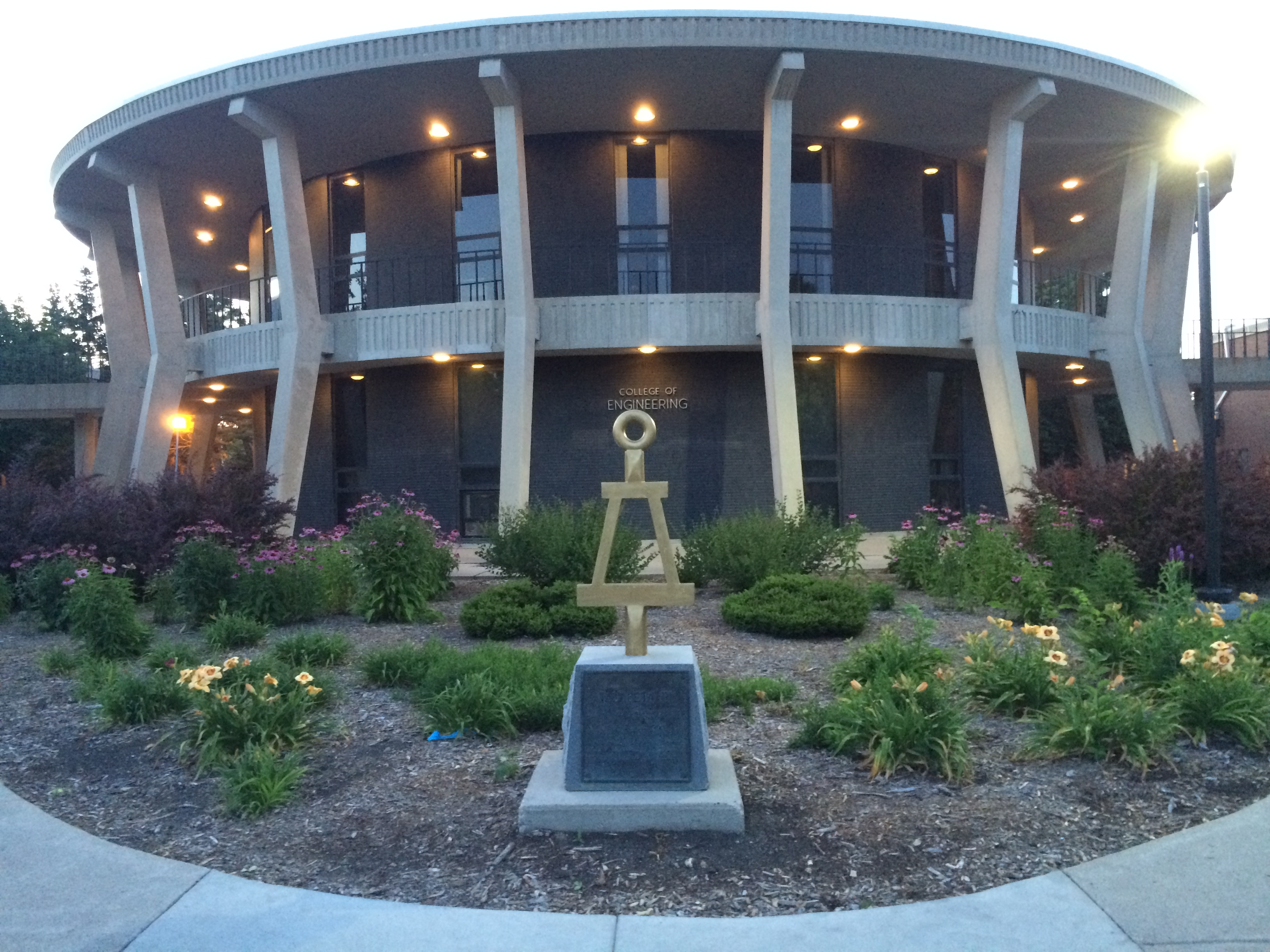
Entrance to College of Engineering (demolished).

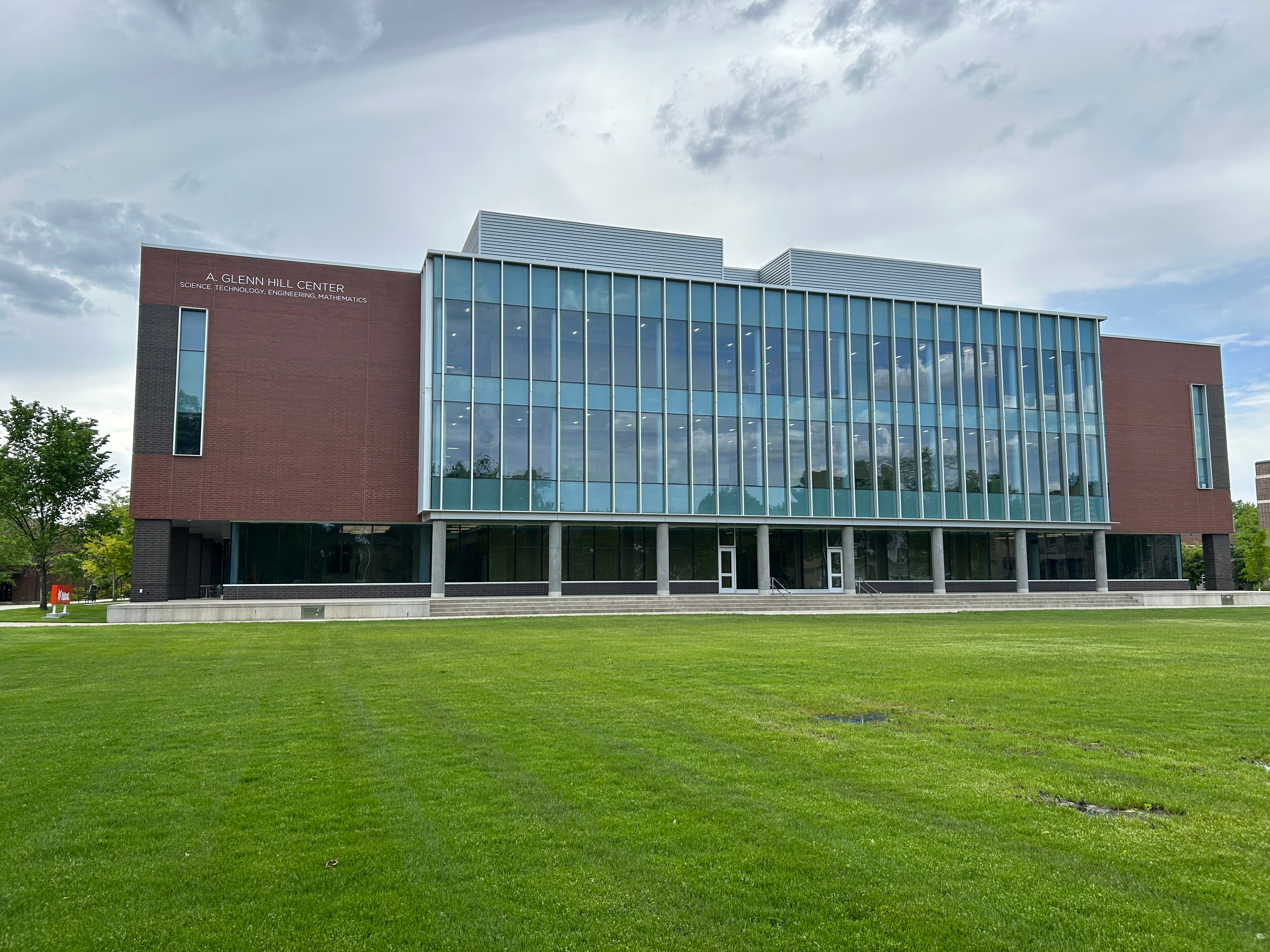
The Ag Glenn Hill Center at NDSU.

The Wallman Wellness Center from the South.

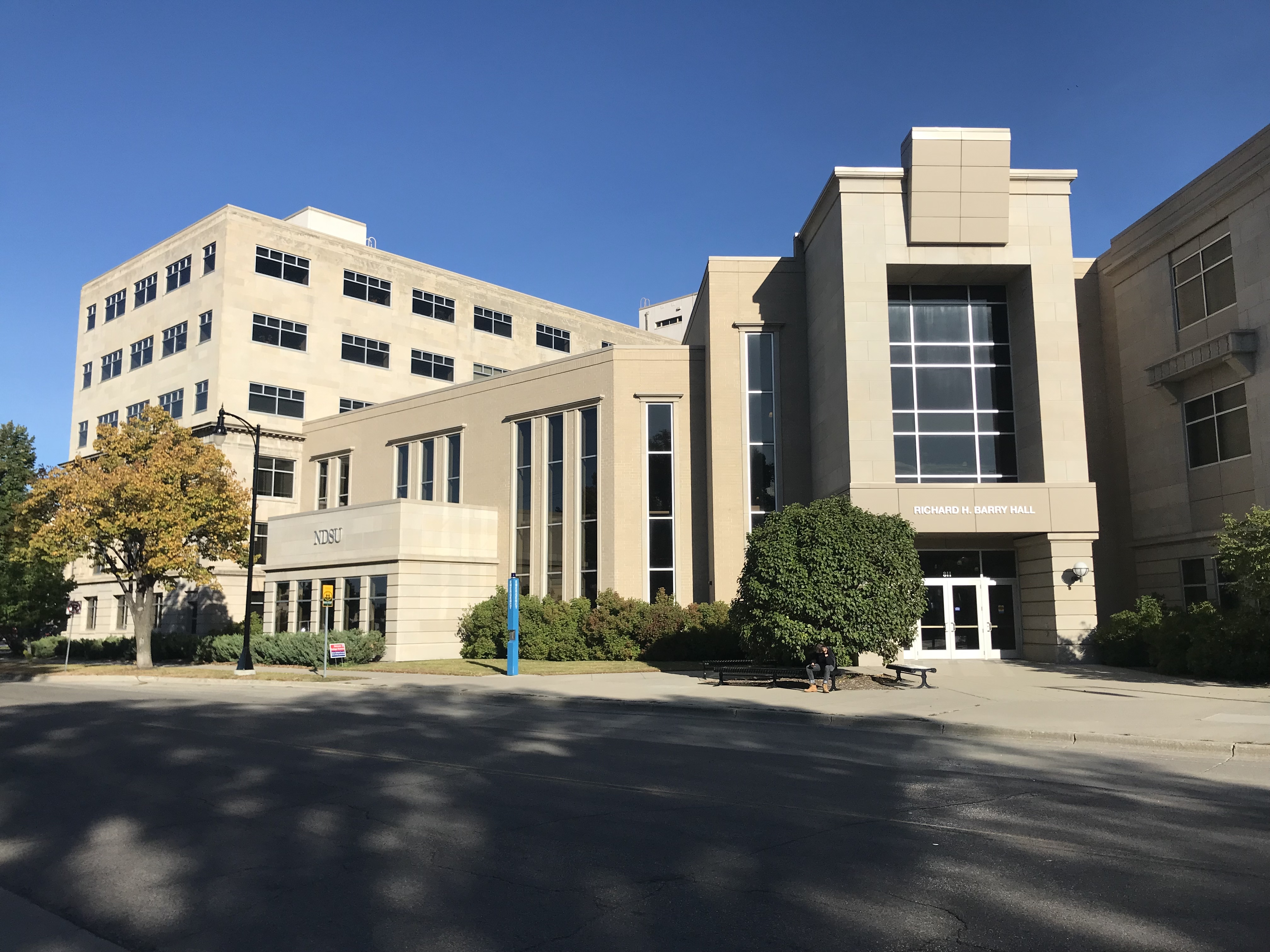
Richard H. Barry Hall in downtown Fargo.

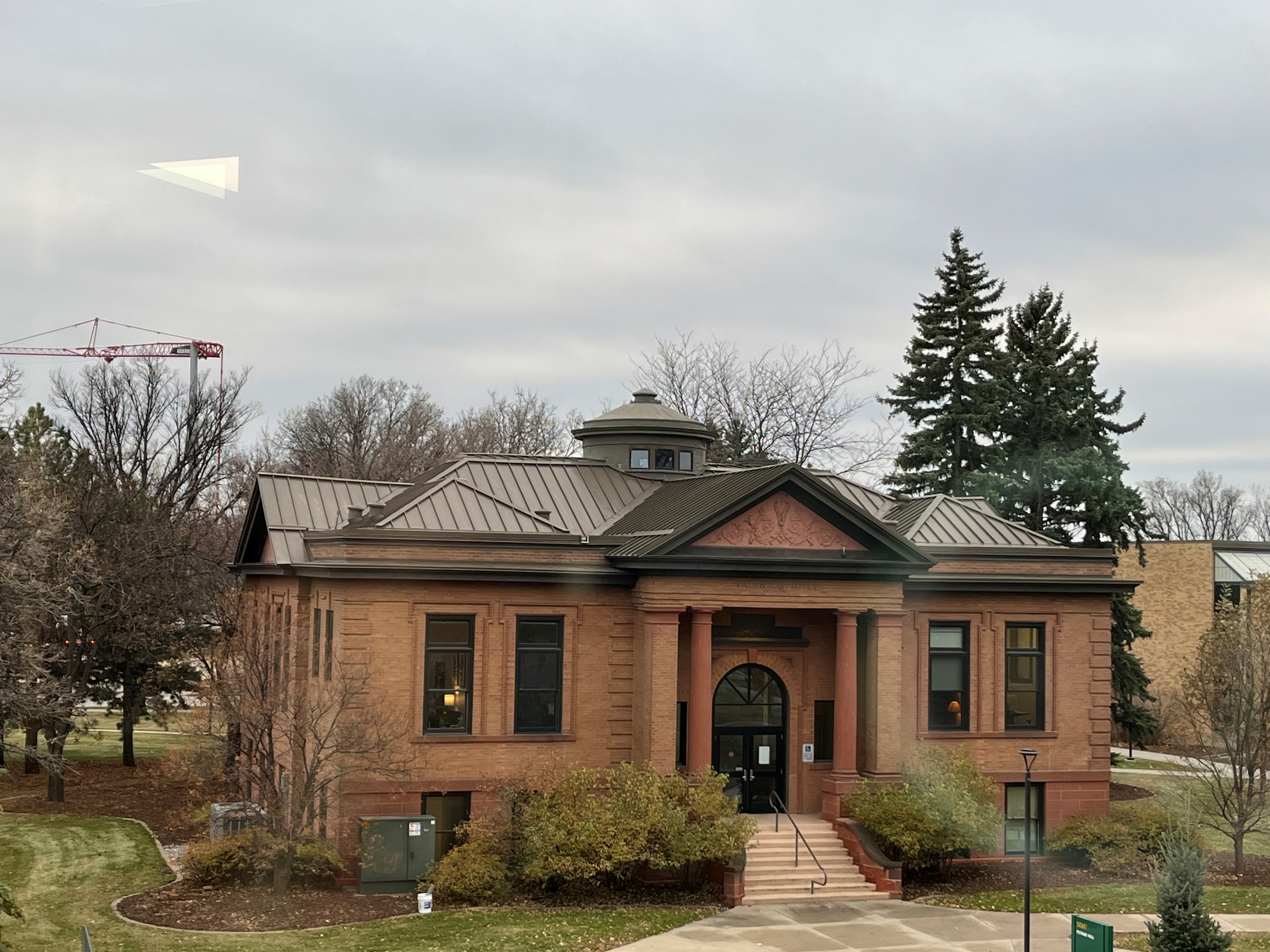
Putnam Hall from the north.

North Dakota State University is primarily in Fargo, North Dakota. It has several campuses, including the main campus, NDSU downtown, and several agricultural research extension centers.

=== Main campus ===
The main campus sits on 258 acres (1.04 km^{2}) and has over 100 buildings. Its appearance is maintained by the university's extensive agricultural programs. The main campus boundaries are 19th Avenue N. to the north, University Drive to the east, 18th St. N. to the west, and 12th Avenue N. to the south.

Located in the historic Minard–South Engineering quad is the Babbling Brook. The area has trickling waterfalls, fish and flowers, an amphitheater seating area, and "buffalo-rubbed" rocks. This area offers a space for outdoor classes and small performances.

==== Southern area ====
The southern area of the campus has many of NDSU's historic buildings.

==== Central area ====
The central area consists of the Shepperd Arena, many academic buildings, and the Quentin Burdick Building. The Engineering Complex was torn down in 2024 as part of a large construction project to modernize and boost the engineering department, the Richard Offerdahl '65 Engineering complex. It is expected to be completed in fall 2026.

The Memorial Union is also in the central campus and serves students' social needs. It has several large rooms for presentations and functions. Several skyways connect the Union to other buildings on campus such as the Quentin Burdick Building.

In 2014, NDSU began construction on the Science, Technology, Engineering, and Mathematics (STEM) building. It has been completed and renamed the A. Glenn Hill Center.

==== North area ====
Just north of the central area of campus is a large section of academic buildings, residence halls, and dining centers. This area is punctuated by four identical residential high-rises surrounded by grassy quads, as well as two sand-volleyball courts and a basketball court. Between the high-rises a dining center serves their 1,000+ residents. Tunnels connect to the towers to ease travel in bad weather. To the east, another dining center serves other residence halls and their 1,000+ residents. In 2019, Catherine Cater hall opened as a coed dormitory.

==== West area ====
This area of campus is home to the NDSU Wallman Wellness Center, which houses the Wellness Center department, Student Health Service, and Disability Services. The Wellness Center, built in 2001, expanded in 2007 and added an aquatic addition in 2016, boasting a lap pool, a relaxing pool, and a wet classroom. Mathew Living Learning Center (MLLC) East and West are coed upper-division dormitories.

==== Athletic area ====
Further north is an area of campus that consists of many athletic facilities including the Scheels Center, Fargodome, Newman Outdoor Field, and others.

In 2022, NDSU opened a $54 million practice facility for the football program, the Nodak Insurance Company Football Performance Complex. It has facilities for other sports, such as golf, soccer, baseball, and track & field.

The Sanford Health Athletic Complex (SHAC) is home to the Scheels Center, the Nodak Insurance Basketball Performance Center, and offices for athletic departments. The SHAC cost $50 million in 2014 as a renovation to the Bison Sports Arena and was completed in 2016. Wrestling and men's and women's basketball are held here and the complex also contains the NDSU athletics hall of fame. Adjacent to the SHAC are the Shelly Ellig Indoor Track and Field Facility and Dacotah Field. The Shelly Ellig facility was completed in 2012 and features an eight-lane track as well as pole-vaulting and throwing equipment. Dacotah field was built in 1938. For winters it has a climate-controlled bubble to facilitate practice.

==== Research and Technology Park ====
The Research and Technology Park is a 55 acres (0.22 km^{2}) site of research offices and laboratories northwest of the main campus. It consists of firms and that research and develop nano technologies, RFID, polymers and coatings, high performance computing, and others. The Research and Technology Park is a 501c(3) nonprofit corporation governed by a board of directors.

The Technology Incubator opened in 2007. The 49,757 square feet (4,622.6 m^{2}) facility is in the NDSU Research and Technology Park. It was developed to assist startup entities and complement the Research and Technology Park. They support various kinds of startups, including ones in biotech, healthcare, and general tech.

=== NDSU Downtown ===
NDSU operates several buildings in downtown Fargo. About 4,000 students, faculty, and staff use the NDSU Downtown facilities each year.

The project started in 2004 with the purchase and renovation of the former Northern School Supply building, at NP Avenue and 8th Street North downtown. The structure, now known as Renaissance Hall, houses NDSU's visual arts department and architecture department, and used to house the office of Tri-College University, a partnership between NDSU, Concordia College, and Minnesota State University Moorhead. Tri-College University was replaced by the Metro College Alliance in 2025.

In 2006, the NDSU Development Foundation purchased the Pioneer Mutual Life Insurance building and Lincoln Mutual Life & Casualty Insurance building along 2nd Avenue North between 8th and 10th Streets, also downtown. The refurbished Pioneer building is now Richard H. Barry Hall. It is home to the NDSU College of Business and Department of Agribusiness and Applied Economics. According to the college, the downtown location and addition of the North Dakota Trade Office have increased interaction with local businesses and allowed the college to expand its offerings, such as a Certificate in Entrepreneurship in partnership with the University of North Dakota, and add three new centers: The Center for Professional Selling and Sales Technology, Fraud Education and Research Institute and the Center for Leadership Practice.

Klai Hall houses the landscape architecture program.

=== Agricultural research extension centers ===
NDSU has many research extension centers across the state encompassing over 18,488 acres (74.82 km^{2}). Major NDSU research extension centers are near Carrington, Casselton, Dickinson, Fargo, Hettinger, Langdon, Minot, Streeter, and Williston.

== Academics ==
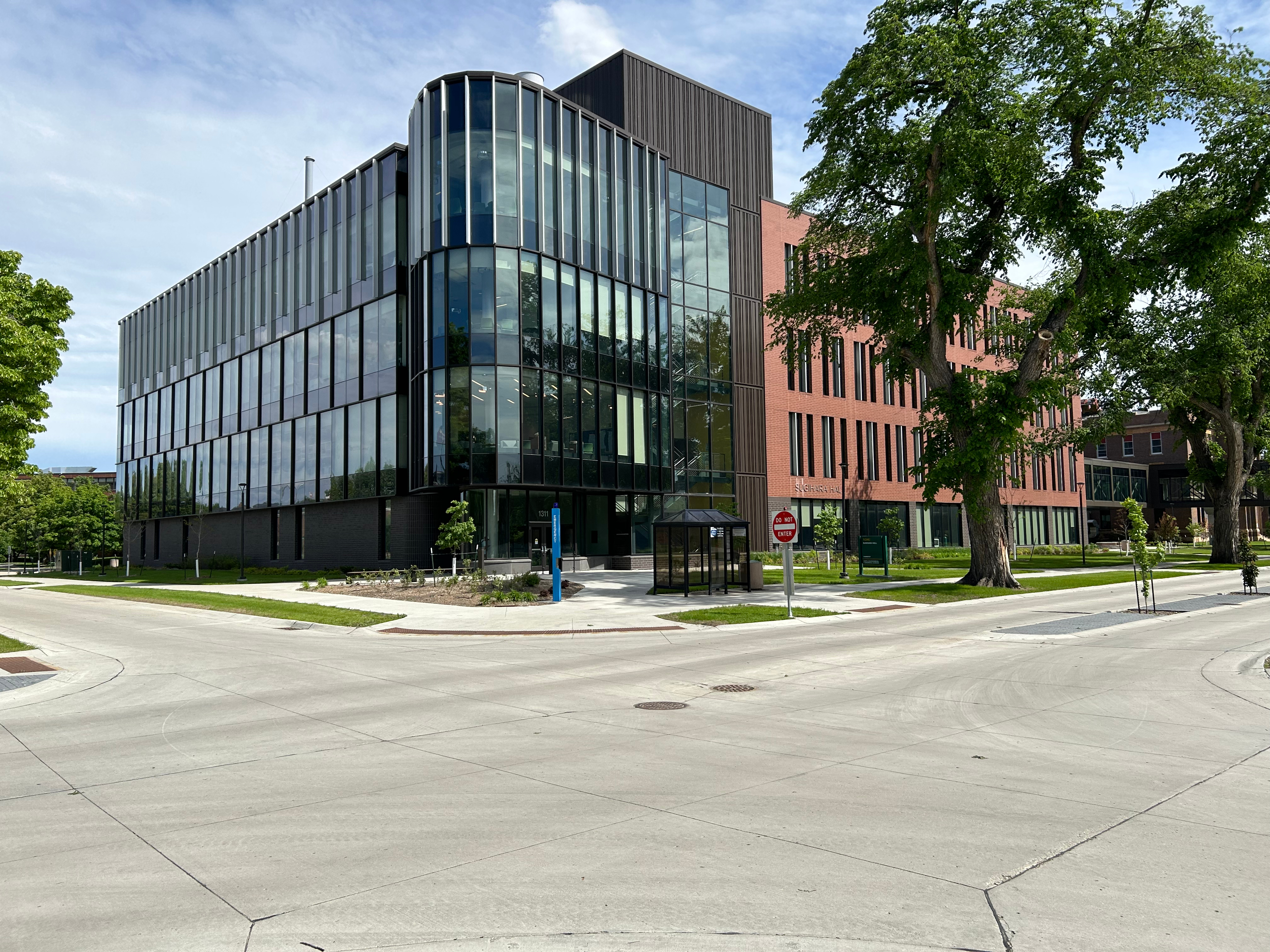
Sugihara Hall at NDSU. Offices and departments include Chemistry & and Earth Sciences.

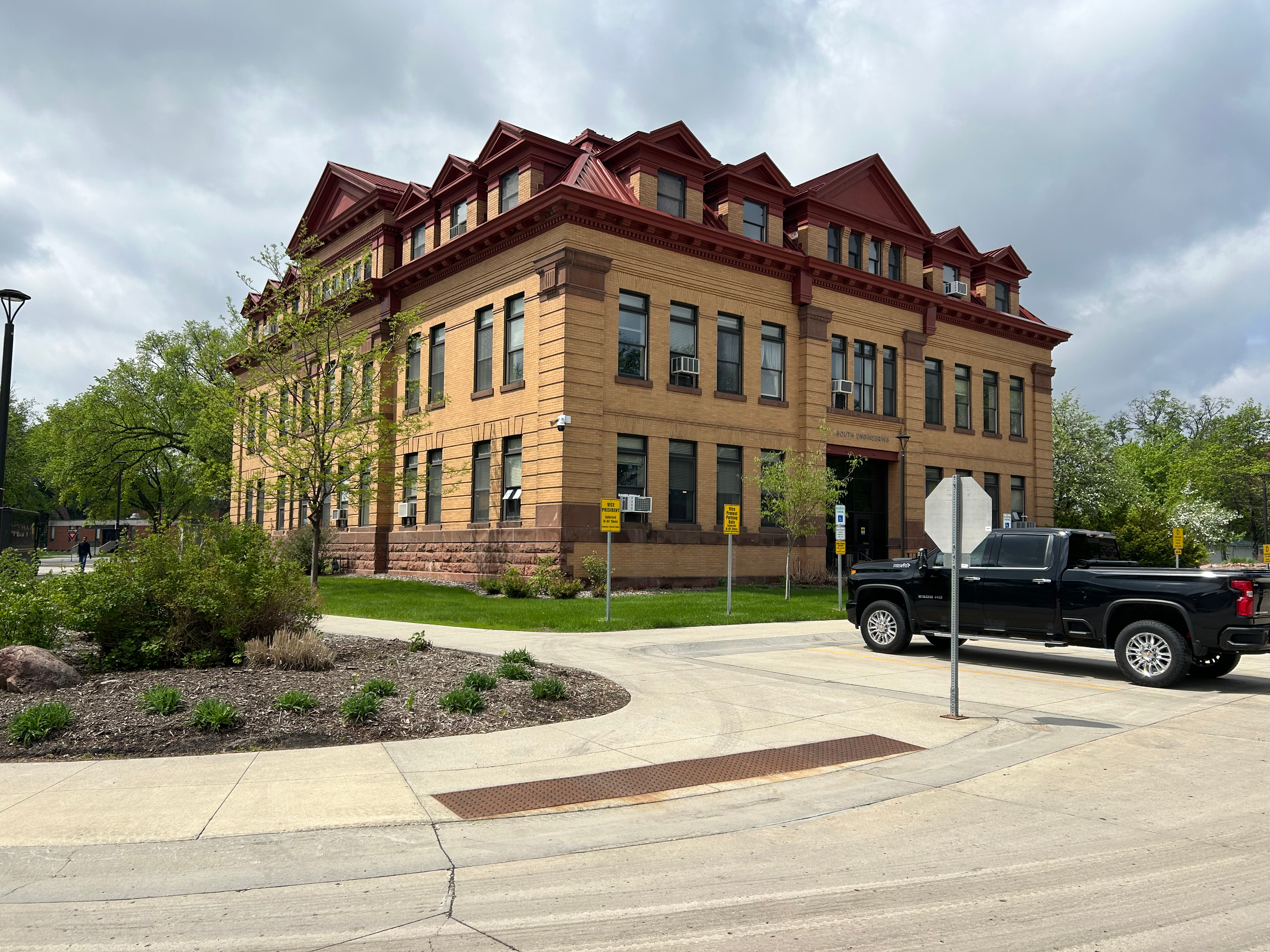
South Engineering Building on a spring afternoon.

North Dakota State University is divided into the following colleges:

- Arts and Sciences
- Engineering
- Health Professions and Human Sciences
- Business
- Agriculture, Food Systems & Natural Resources

NDSU offers a major known as University Studies that allows a student to study in nearly any area that interests them. To enhance learning among its students, NDSU offers online classes, online academic portals, or technology enhanced classrooms.

NDSU uses a semester system—Fall and Spring, with two summer sessions. As of 2022, most students are full-time. Students are 49% male identifying and 51% female identifying.

=== Admissions ===
As of 2022, 91.6% of applicants were admitted to NDSU, with admitted students having an average GPA of 3.47. Admission is test-optional, NDSU requiring neither ACT nor SAT test scores for admission. Among those applicants submitting scores, the average SAT score was 1170 and average ACT score was 24.

=== Rankings ===
Academic rankings

National
- Forbes: 275
- U.S. News & World Report: 231
- Washington Monthly: 147
- WSJ/College Pulse: 401–500

Global
- U.S. News & World Report: 1344

U.S. News & World Report ranked NDSU as tied at #231 for the 2025 best colleges and national universities. The university's engineering programs ranked 165 out of 212 engineering programs offering a doctoral degree.

=== Libraries ===
Total collections at the NDSU libraries include holdings of approximately 1 million physical items in addition to access to extensive electronic resources. There is a main library, an archival Heritage Collection, and various libraries devoted to specialty fields like architecture, business, health sciences, regional studies, and university archives.

== Research ==
NDSU is classified among "R1-Doctoral Universities – Very High Research Activity". The university is a major component of the Red River Valley Research Corridor. According to the NSF Higher Education and Research Development (HERD) survey, NDSU ranked in the top 100 research universities for agricultural sciences and social sciences in 2017. According to the National Science Foundation, NDSU is the largest research institution in the state of North Dakota. NDSU's annual research expenditures exceed $150 million. Major fields of research at NDSU include nanotechnology, genomics, agriculture, chemistry, and polymers and coatings. NDSU also has a 55-acre (220×10^{3} m^{2}) Research and Technology Park on the north side of the main campus.

== Athletics ==
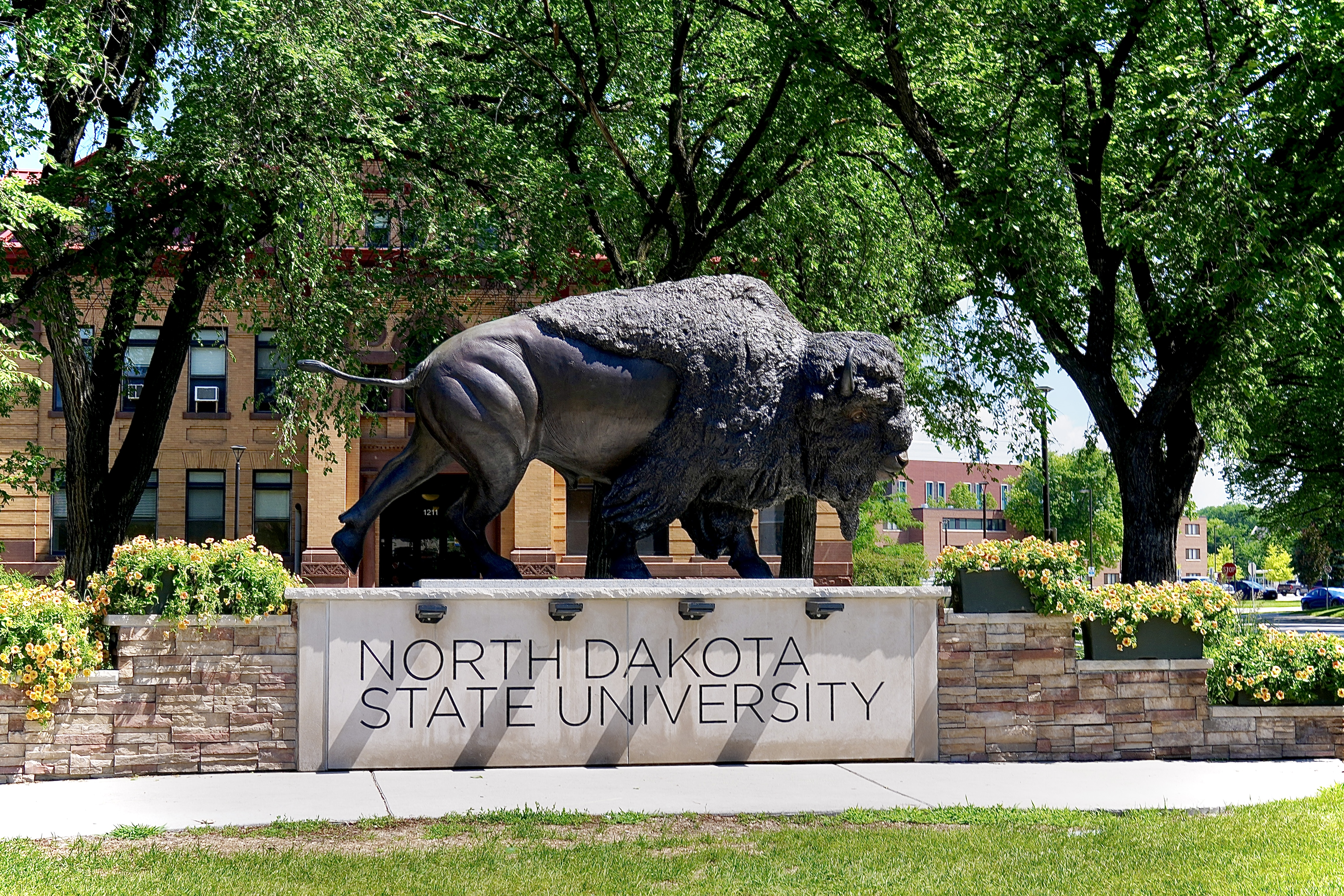
NDSU's sports teams are known as the North Dakota State Bison

NDSU's sports teams are known as the North Dakota State Bison, or simply The Bison (pronounced "biZon"). They are also known as "The Thundering Herd". NDSU's athletic symbol is a caricature of the American bison.

North Dakota State's intercollegiate sports teams participate in NCAA Division I in all sports. NDSU was a charter member of the Division II North Central Conference (NCC), and made the move to Division I sports in the fall of 2004. NDSU spent the next two years as an independent in Division I in all sports other than football, in which it was a member of the Great West Football Conference. The school was accepted into the Summit League on August 31, 2006, and began play in that conference on July 1, 2007. The football team left the Great West Football Conference and joined the Missouri Valley Football Conference on March 7, 2007. They became a full member of the conference during the 2008 season. NDSU joined the Big 12 Conference in wrestling in 2015. Their football team left the Missouri Valley Football Conference in the FCS to join the Mountain West Conference in the FBS in 2026.

=== Football ===
In the 2015 season, NDSU defeated Jacksonville State for a record fifth consecutive NCAA Division I FCS national championship. No other football team in the modern history of the NCAA has accomplished this feat. In the 2016 season, NDSU was defeated by James Madison, 27–17, who eventually went on to win the championship. This ended the Bisons' reign of five consecutive championships. The following season the Bison went on to win the FCS National Championship again for the sixth time in seven years, by beating James Madison, 17–13. In 2018, the Bison completed an undefeated season going 15–0 and defeating the Eastern Washington Eagles, 38–24, and winning their 7th FCS championship in 8 years. After defeating James Madison in 2019 for a third straight title, the Bison lost in the 2020-21 FCS quarterfinals in the COVID-impacted spring season to eventual champion Sam Houston State before reclaiming the title in 2021 with a decisive 38–10 victory over Montana State. After a three year championship drought, the Bison claimed their 10th FCS national title with a thrilling 35-32 win over Montana State on January 6, 2025. This gave NDSU its 18th national championship in Football when combining them with their division 2 accolades, tying them with Yale for most national championships in NCAA football. North Dakota State University has the most NCAA FCS football championships, as of 2025.

On September 17, 2016, the Bison upset the No. 13 Iowa Hawkeyes, 23–21. It was the Bison's sixth-straight win against a team in the NCAA Division I Football Bowl Subdivision. This was the third and most recent time an FCS team defeated a top 15 ranked FBS school.

They left the Missouri Valley Football Conference in the FCS to join the Mountain West Conference in the NCAA Division I Football Bowl Subdivision in 2026.

=== Basketball ===
The women's basketball team won five NCAA National Championships during the 1990s – 1991, 1993 through 1996. In January 2006, the NCAA recognized NDSU's four consecutive Division II Women's Basketball Championships (1993–1996) as one of the "25 Most Defining Moments in NCAA History."

On March 10, 2009, North Dakota State gained an automatic invitation to the NCAA basketball tournament in its first year of eligibility for Division I postseason play, by defeating Oakland 66–64 in the Summit League Tournament Championship game. The #14 seeded Bison lost to #3 Kansas in the 1st Round in a game played in Minneapolis, MN.

NDSU also made the 2015 NCAA basketball tournament, with the #15 seeded Bison falling 86–76 to #2 seeded Gonzaga in the Round of 64. (Gonzaga went on to the Elite Eight, before losing to Duke, the eventual Tournament Champion.) The Bison last played in the NCAA Tournament in 2019, winning a First Four game against North Carolina Central by a 78–74 score. This advanced the Bison to the opening round bracket where they took on #1 seed Duke, eventually falling 85–62. The 2020 men's team went 25-8 during the season, won the Summit League tournament title, defeating in-state rival North Dakota in the championship game but were not able to compete in the NCAA Tournament, which was canceled due to the COVID-19 pandemic.

=== Other sports ===
North Dakota State's Bison dance team won back to back National Championships. They took 1st place at UDA nationals in 2012 and 2013 in the pom category in Orlando, Florida.

Amy Olson (née Anderson), a member of the women's golf team, set the NCAA record for most career match victories (20).

== Student life ==
Undergraduate demographics as of 2024-25
Race and ethnicity	Total
White	81%
Black	6%
Hispanic	4%
Asian	4%
Indigenous American	3%
Pacific Islander	1%
Unknown	1%
Economic diversity
Low-income (Note: The percentage of students who received an income-based federal Pell grant intended for low-income students.)	26%
Affluent (Note: The percentage of students who are a part of the American middle class at the bare minimum.)	74%

Residence Dining Center

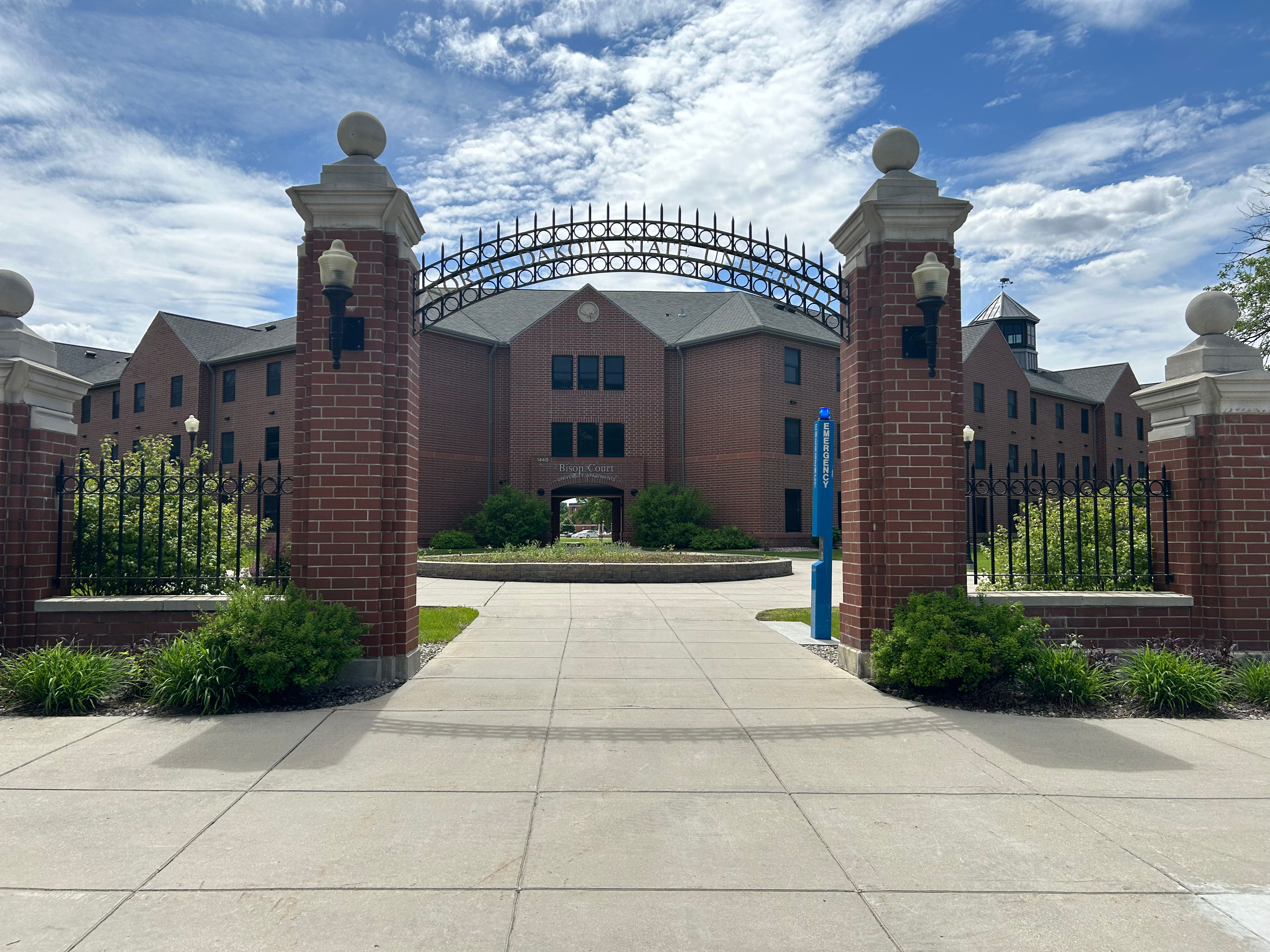
Entrance to Bison Court, one of the University Apartments

=== Campus media ===
Thunder Radio, an NDSU radio station, operates on KNDS-LP 96.3 FM. The Bison Information Network, founded in 2008, is a student-run TV station. It focuses on student and athletic news and is broadcast on YouTube weekly.

==== Publications ====
The Spectrum is NDSU's student newspaper. It has been in print since 1896.

Bison Illustrated is a magazine covering North Dakota State Bison athletics.

NDSU magazine is a magazine for alumni and friends of North Dakota State University. Story ideas and information for NDSU magazine come from a variety of sources. The inaugural issue was October 2000.

Northern Eclecta is a literary journal produced by students in NDSU's Literary Publications class. It accepts creative writing, photographs, and artwork from NDSU students and community students in grades 7–12.

=== Performing arts ===
The Division of Performing Arts offers four performance facilities:

- Festival Concert Hall – An acoustically tuned 1,000-seat hall, opened in 1982. FCH is the concert home for all NDSU music major ensembles, such as the Gold Star Concert Band and the NDSU Concert Choir, and the Fargo-Moorhead Symphony and Fargo-Moorhead Opera.
- Beckwith Recital Hall – A smaller setting with a seating capacity of 200. It is used as a classroom for art and music as well as faculty, student and small group recitals.
- Askanase Auditorium – A 380-seat proscenium theater. Theatre NDSU uses the theater for most of its plays.
- Walsh Studio Theatre – A flexible studio-laboratory black box theater. It is in Askanase Hall.

NDSU's Gold Star Marching Band performs for Bison football games at Gate City Bank Field in the Fargodome.

=== Residence life ===
The Department of Residence Life operates 13 residence halls and four apartment complexes on campus. NDSU requires that all first-year students live in an on-campus residence hall.

=== The Memorial Union ===
Construction of the Memorial Union was completed in 1953, and the grand opening held during Homecoming weekend that year. The Memorial Union initially had a ballroom and dining center. In 2005, the building underwent a $22 million expansion and remodeling. Today, the Memorial Union has three floors. The main floor is home to the NDSU Bookstore, a Caribou Coffee branch, US Bank branch, and various offices. A ballroom and several conference rooms comprise much of the second floor, and the basement is home to a dining center, food court, and various recreation facilities, including a bowling alley, billiards, foosball, e-sports gaming lab. The Memorial Union opened a Chick-fil-a on campus in 2025, and the renovation of the Dining Center will be completed in 2029.

=== Greek life ===
Greek life has been a part of the NDSU campus since 1904 when the first social fraternity was formed offering membership to men in all fields of study. The first women's social fraternity was formed on campus in 1908.

As of 2024, approximately 638 members made up about 7.1% of the campus population. At NDSU, about 9% of male students are in a fraternity and about 5% of females in a sorority. NDSU has 15 national fraternities and sororities, 12 of which are open to students in any field and two that restrict membership to students in specific professional disciplines and/or areas of career interest.
