= Marisha Chamberlain =

American writer

- Born: January 6, 1952 (age 74)
- Occupation: Writer

Marisha Anne Chamberlain (born January 6, 1952) is an American writer. Her most recent work, the libretto for Mortals & Angels, a collaboration with American composer Carol Barnett, premiered at Carnegie Hall in 2016, a companion piece to their widely produced collaborative piece, The World Beloved: A Bluegrass Mass. Her stage plays, both original works and adaptations are widely produced. Her debut novel, The Rose Variations, was published by Soho Press in 2009. Her play, Scheherazade, won the Dramatists Guild/CBS National Award, and in her screenplay version, played on public television across the country, and was screened at the British Film Institute Festival in the category of Best of American Public Television.

== Bibliography ==
=== Libretti ===
- Mortals & Angels: A Bluegrass Te Deum with composer Carol Barnett, forthcoming from Boosey & Hawkes, 2016.
- The World Beloved: A Bluegrass Mass, published by Boosey & Hawkes, 2008.
- The World Beloved: A Bluegrass Mass CD, released on the Clarion Label, 2008

=== Plays ===
- Hope for Breakfast (original full-length play), Playscripts Inc.
- The Canterville Ghost (stage adaptation), Playscripts Inc., 2004
- Rebecca of Sunnybrook Farm (stage adaptation), Playscripts Inc., 2004
- Young Jane Eyre (stage adaptation), Playscripts Inc., 2004
- Evergreen (original full-length play), Playscripts Inc., 2004
- Little Women (stage adaptation), Playscripts Inc., 2003
- Scheherazade (original full-length play), Dramatists Play Service, 1985
- Scheherazade (play, German translation) Litag Theaterverlag, Bremen, Germany, 1991

=== Fiction and poetry ===
- The Rose Variations (novel), Soho Press, 2009, ISBN 1569475385
- Powers (poetry, Minnesota voices project), 1981, ISBN 0898230500
