= Who Stole the Kishka? =

Song by Walter Dana & Walter Solek

Song
- Genre: Polka
- Composer: Walter Dana
- Lyricist: Walt Solek

Audio sample
- file; help

Who Stole the Kishka?, originally spelled "Who Stole the Keeshka?", is a polka song written by Walter Dana (music) and Walter Solek (lyrics). It has been recorded and performed by various bands. The version by The Matys Brothers reached number 7 on Canada's CHUM Charts. One popular version was familiar to American radio audiences from a 1963 recording by the Grammy Award–winning polka artist Frankie Yankovic. It is a homage to kiszka, also known as kaszanka.

According to an obituary for Walt Solek, who wrote and recorded the song, "Keeshka always gets the crowd going at a Polkaholics show as it has since it was recorded in the 1950s with English lyrics!"

The song ends with the kishka being found by "Yasou", who in the last verse is called "Yasha", as in "Yasha brought it back".
