= The Matys Brothers =

The Matys Brothers were an American lounge act made up of four singing comedians. All four were born and raised in Chester, in the Philadelphia area. The quartet's first record, "Muskrat Ramble," that was released on the Essex Records label, became a big hit in 1954, and by 1956 the group was part of Bill Haley's talent and booking stable and recording for Decca Records. The members of the band were Emil on saxophone, John on bass and violin, Gene on drums, and Walt on accordion.

== History ==
On August 28, 1957, the Matys Brothers appeared on American Bandstand performing "Muskrat Ramble" and "Crazy Street." "Muskrat Ramble" was a 1954 chart entry in Cashbox and Variety.

In 1958, the Matys Brothers made two records for Haley's Clymax record label, one of which, "Crazy Street," co written by Haley, later was considered a rockabilly classic. On this song and the three others recorded for Clymax, the Matys Brothers were backed by members of Bill Haley's band, The Comets (several of their recordings were also written by members of Haley's group). Later, the Matys Brothers grew to rely on their own instrumentation (Walt: the accordion, John: the bass and fiddle, Emil: the sax, and Gene: the drums). Gene and Emil could play any instrument (you put in their hands) and began recording polka music for the Sunnyside and Select labels during the late 1950s and early 1960s. "Rummy Polka" was a hit for them in 1959, and the Matys Brothers scored their biggest hit in 1963, "Who Stole the Keeshka?"

In the 1960s and 1970s, the brothers, John, Walt, Emil and Gene, toured the west coast. They appeared in the 1960s at The Showboat in Las Vegas, The Holiday Hotel downtown Reno, Nevada, and The Commercial Hotel in Elko, Nevada.

Some of the brothers struggled, at times, to maintain normal family life due to the late hours and the demanding travel, that was a part of their profession. Emil has a daughter, Terri, who was born during his first marriage to Mertis. After a divorce, he then married the band's singer Maria Carmen and they have one son, Marc. Gene had two children with his first wife, Wanda, they were Tom and Diane, that ended in divorce. He then married Pearl and had two sons, including Gene Jr. After his second marriage, Gene married Donna and had two children Ross and Tanna. Emil lived in Elko, Nevada and died on May 5, 2008; Gene died October 12, 1993 in Elko.

Emil was not only remembered for his years of entertaining with the Matys Brothers, but also for the time and efforts he spent voluntarily while working with high school musicians, during the last several years of his life in Elko.

== Discography ==
- "Cut the Meatballs in Half" Vinyl single
- "Drunk Last Night" 7-inch Vinyl single
- "Rummy Polka" Sunnyside Records, 7inch Vinyl single
- "Kazoo Polka" Sunnyside Records, 7-inch Vinyl singe
- "Crazy Street" Coral-61941 Vinyl single
- "I Want to See the Sunshine in Your Smile" 7-inch Vinyl single
- "My Truly Truly Fair" 5.90 4.90
- "That's a Plenty" Sound-106 Vinyl single
- "Who Stole the Keeshka?" Select-719 Vinyl single
- "With Friends Like You" Fayette-1627 Vinyl single
- Crazy Street Bear Family BCD 15971 MCA 11119 (CD compilation)
- Rock Me Daddy Collector CLCD 4475 (CD compilation)
