= Audrey Hepburn on screen and stage =

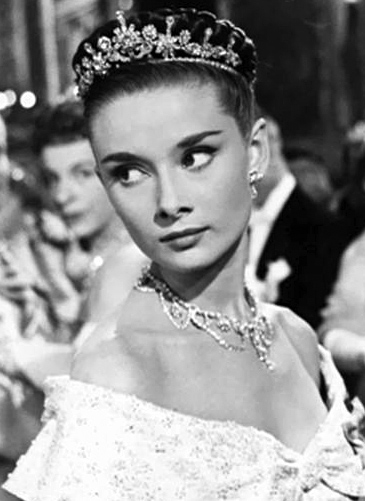
Hepburn as Princess Ann in Roman Holiday (1953)

Audrey Hepburn (1929–1993) was a British actress who had an extensive career in film, television, and on the stage. Considered by some to be one of the most beautiful women of all time, she was ranked as the third greatest screen legend in American cinema by the American Film Institute. Hepburn is also remembered as both a film and style icon. Her debut was as a flight stewardess in the 1948 Dutch film Dutch in Seven Lessons. Hepburn then performed on the British stage as a chorus girl in the musicals High Button Shoes (1948), and Sauce Tartare (1949). Two years later, she made her Broadway debut as the title character in the play Gigi. Hepburn's Hollywood debut as a runaway princess in William Wyler's Roman Holiday (1953), opposite Gregory Peck, made her a star. For her performance, she received the Academy Award for Best Actress, the BAFTA Award for Best British Actress, and the Golden Globe Award for Best Actress in a Motion Picture – Drama. In 1954, she played a chauffeur's daughter caught in a love triangle in Billy Wilder's romantic comedy Sabrina, opposite Humphrey Bogart and William Holden. In the same year, Hepburn garnered the Tony Award for Best Actress in a Play for portraying the titular water nymph in the play Ondine.

Her next role was as Natasha Rostova in the 1956 film adaptation of Leo Tolstoy's War and Peace. In 1957, Hepburn starred with Fred Astaire in the musical film Funny Face, and with Gary Cooper and Maurice Chevalier in Billy Wilder's Love in the Afternoon. Two years later, she appeared in the romantic adventure film Green Mansions, and played a nun in The Nun's Story. In 1961, Hepburn played café society girl Holly Golightly in the romantic comedy Breakfast at Tiffany's, and as a teacher accused of lesbianism in Wyler's drama The Children's Hour, opposite Shirley MacLaine. Two years later, she appeared opposite Cary Grant in the romantic mystery film Charade. Hepburn followed this by starring in the romantic comedy Paris When It Sizzles, opposite William Holden, and as Cockney flower girl Eliza Doolittle in the musical film My Fair Lady (both in 1964). In 1967, she played a blind woman menaced by drug dealers in her own home in the suspense thriller Wait Until Dark, which earned her a Best Actress Oscar nomination. Nine years later, Hepburn played Maid Marian opposite Sean Connery as Robin Hood in Robin and Marian.

Her final film appearance was a cameo as an angel in Steven Spielberg's Always (1989). Hepburn's final screen role was as the host of the television documentary series Gardens of the World with Audrey Hepburn (1993), for which she posthumously received the Primetime Emmy Award for Outstanding Individual Achievement – Informational Programming. In recognition of her career, Hepburn earned the Special Award from BAFTA, the Golden Globe Cecil B. DeMille Award, the Screen Actors Guild Life Achievement Award, and the Special Tony Award.

== Film ==
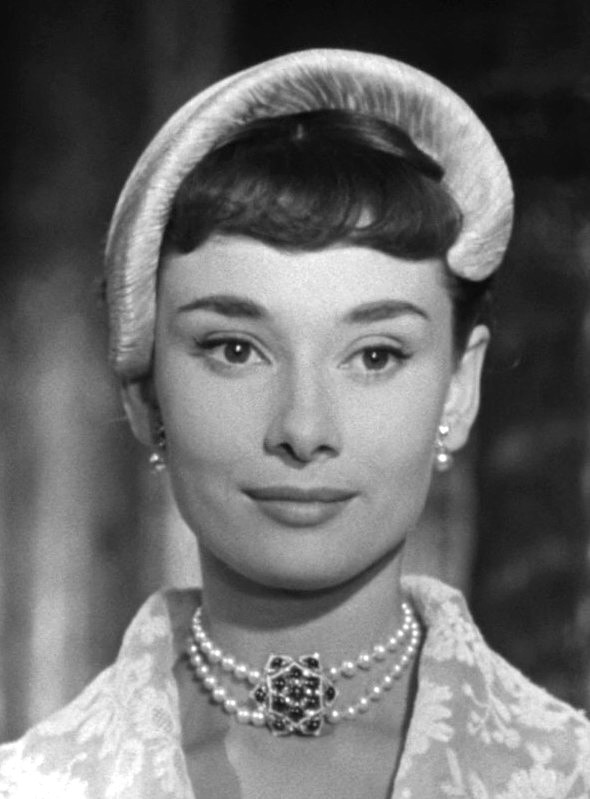
In Roman Holiday (1953)

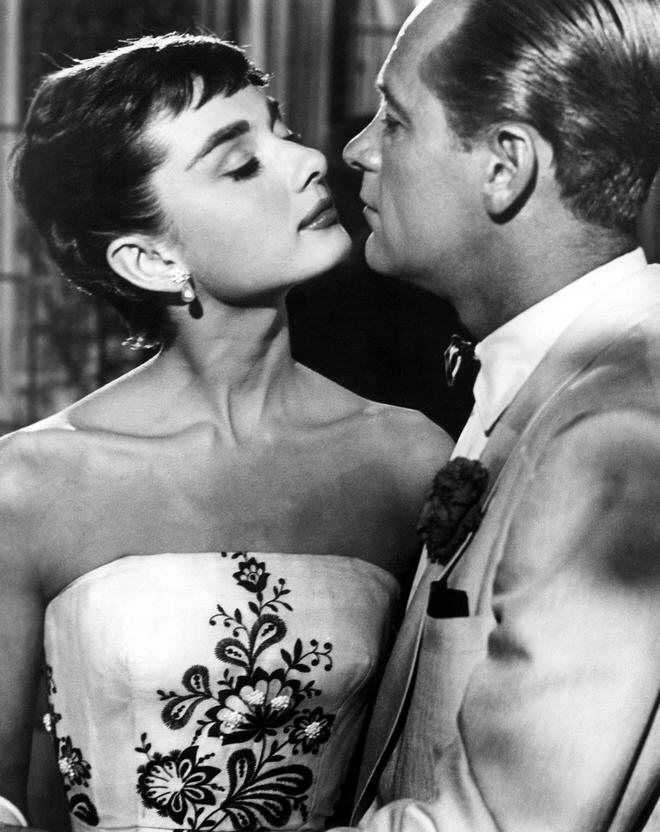
With William Holden in Sabrina (1954)

Year	Title	Role	Notes	Ref(s)
1948	Dutch in Seven Lessons	Stewardess	Dutch: Nederlands in Zeven Lessen	
1951	One Wild Oat	Hotel receptionist	Uncredited	
1951	Laughter in Paradise	Cigarette girl		
1951	The Lavender Hill Mob	Chiquita		
1951	Young Wives' Tale	Eve Lester		
1952	Secret People	Nora Brentano		
1952	Monte Carlo Baby	Linda Farrell; Melissa Farrell (French version)	Simultaneously filmed in both English and French; French: Nous irons à Monte-Carlo	
1953	Roman Holiday	Princess Ann		
1954	Sabrina	Sabrina Fairchild	UK: Sabrina Fair	
1956	War and Peace	Natasha Rostova		
1957	Funny Face	Jo Stockton		
1957	Love in the Afternoon	Ariane Chavasse		
1959	Green Mansions	Rima		
1959	The Nun's Story	Sister Luke		
1960	The Unforgiven	Rachel Zachary		
1961	Breakfast at Tiffany's	Holly Golightly		
1961	The Children's Hour	Karen Wright		
1963	Charade	Regina Lampert		
1964	Paris When It Sizzles	Gabrielle Simpson		
1964	My Fair Lady	Eliza Doolittle		
1965	Rapture	Agnes Larbaud	Originally going to play Agnes Larbaud opposite Yul Brynner, but the role was eventually given to Patricia Gozzi	
1966	How to Steal a Million	Nicole Bonnet		
1967	Two for the Road	Joanna Wallace		
1967	Wait Until Dark	Susy Hendrix		
1976	Robin and Marian	Maid Marian		
1979	Bloodline	Elizabeth Roffe		
1981	They All Laughed	Angela Niotes		
1989	Always	Hap		

== Television ==
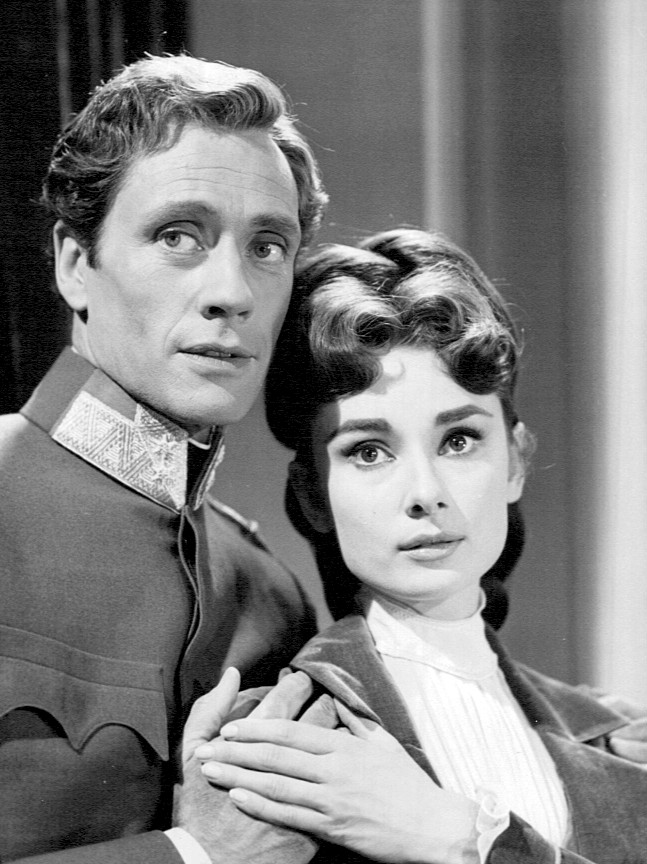
With Mel Ferrer in the teleplay Mayerling (1957)

Year	Title	Role	Notes	Ref(s)
1950	Saturday Night Revue	Unknown	3 episodes	
1951	Sunday Night Theatre	Celia	Episode: "The Silent Village"	
1952	Toast of the Town	Lady Jane Grey	Episode: "Nine Days a Queen"	
1952	CBS Television Workshop	Virginia Forsythe	Episode: "Rainy Day at Paradise Junction"	
1957	Producers' Showcase	Mary Vetsera	Episode: "Mayerling"	
1970	A World of Love	Herself	UNICEF special	
1987	Love Among Thieves	Caroline DuLac	Television film	
1988	American Masters	Herself	Episode: "Directed by William Wyler"; Documentary	
1988	Gregory Peck: His Own Man	Herself	Documentary	
1993	Gardens of the World with Audrey Hepburn	Herself	Documentary series	

== Stage ==
Year(s)	Title	Role	Theatre	Notes	Ref(s)
1948–1949	High Button Shoes	Chorus girl	London Hippodrome		
1949	Sauce Tartare	Chorus girl	Cambridge Theatre		
1950	Sauce Piquante	Featured player	Cambridge Theatre		
1951–1952	Gigi	Gigi	Fulton Theatre	24 November 1951 – 31 May 1952	
1954	Ondine	Ondine	46th Street Theatre	18 February 1954 – 3 July 1954	

== See also ==
- List of EGOT winners
- List of Presidential Medal of Freedom recipients

== Bibliography ==
- Fearn-Banks, Kathleen (4 August 2009). The A to Z of African-American Television. Lanham, Maryland: Scarecrow Press. ISBN 978-0-8108-6348-4. OCLC 699319372.
- Gitlin, Martin (30 December 2008). Audrey Hepburn: A Biography. Westport, Connecticut: ABC-CLIO. ISBN 978-0-313-35945-3. OCLC 298456360. Archived from the original on 6 August 2023.
- Molyneaux, Gerard (1 January 1995). Gregory Peck: A Bio-bibliography. Westport, Connecticut: Greenwood Publishing Group. ISBN 978-0-313-28668-1. OCLC 246712846.
- Spoto, Donald (9 October 2007). Enchantment: The Life of Audrey Hepburn. Random House. ISBN 978-0-09-948704-3.
- Woodward, Ian (31 May 2012). Audrey Hepburn: Fair Lady of the Screen. Ebury Publishing. ISBN 978-1-4481-3293-5.
