= List of awards and honours received by Audrey Hepburn =

List of Audrey Hepburn's awards
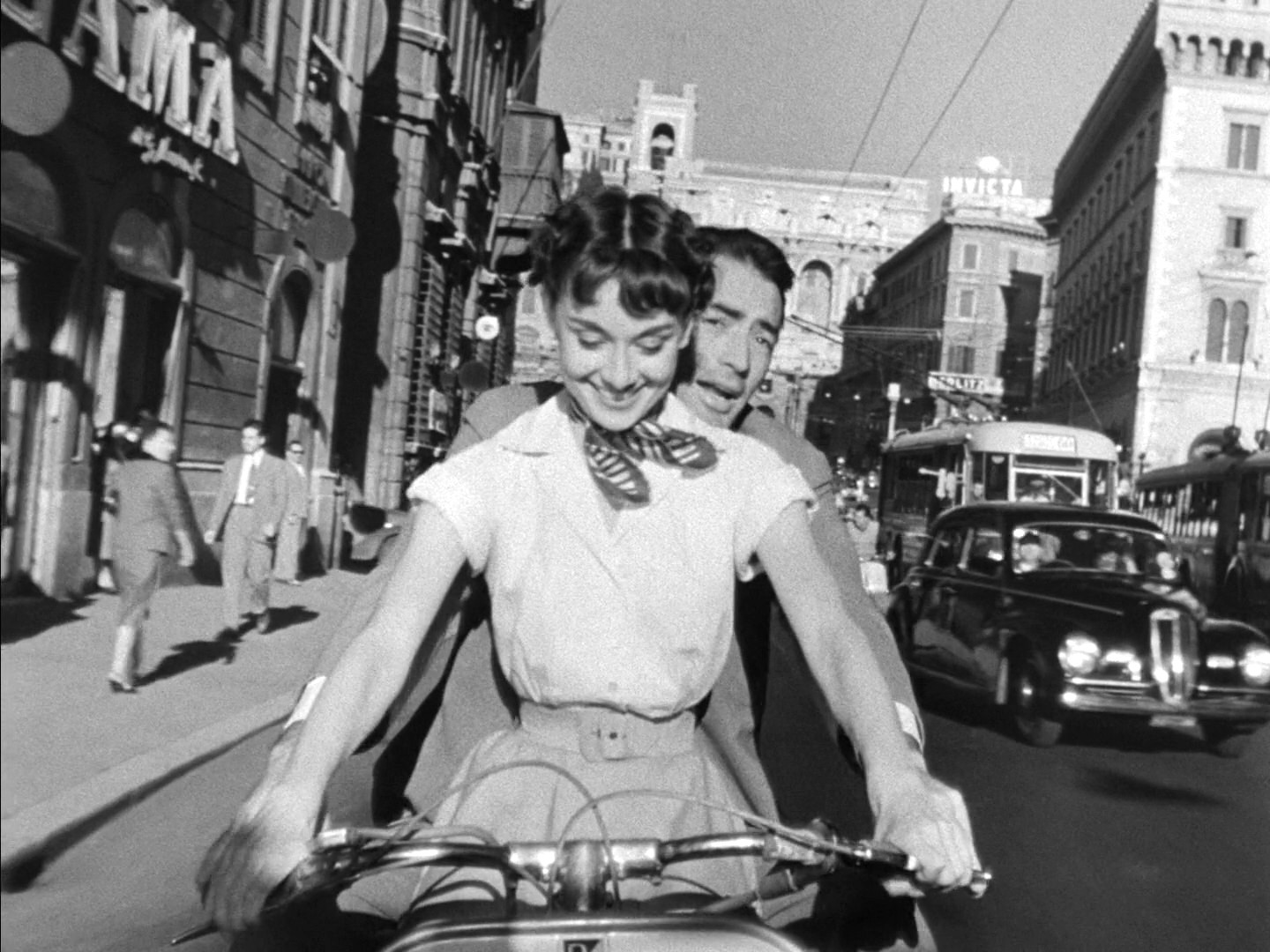
- Hepburn as Princess Ann in Roman Holiday (1953), her first major starring role and one of her most critically acclaimed
Award	Wins	Nominations
Academy Awards	1	5
BAFTA Awards	3	5
Emmy Awards, Primetime	1	1
Golden Globes	2	10
Grammy Awards	1	1
Tony Awards	1	1

Audrey Hepburn received numerous awards and honors during her career. Hepburn won, or was nominated for, awards for her work in motion pictures, television, spoken-word recording, on stage, and humanitarian work. She was five-times nominated for an Academy Award, and she was awarded the 1953 Academy Award for Best Actress for her performance in Roman Holiday and the Jean Hersholt Humanitarian Award in 1993, post-humously, for her humanitarian work. She won a record three BAFTA Awards for Best British Actress in a Leading Role, from five nominations, and she received a Lifetime Achievement Award in 1992. Hepburn received 10 Golden Globe nominations, winning two, and she was the recipient of the Cecil B. DeMille Award in 1990. She also won the 1954 Tony Award for Best Performance by a Leading Actress in a Play in Ondine, and she received a Special Tony Award in 1968.

Post-humously, Hepburn also received a number of awards and honors, including a Primetime Emmy Award for her television series Gardens of the World with Audrey Hepburn, while her contributions to a spoken-word recording titled Audrey Hepburn's Enchanted Tales earned her a Grammy Award. Hepburn stands as one of few entertainers who have won Academy, Emmy, Grammy, and Tony Awards. She has been honored on United States postage stamps, and she has a star on the Hollywood Walk of Fame. The American Film Institute has repeatedly recognized her talent, placing Hepburn third on its list of the top 100 female stars of all time and placing several of the films she starred in on its 100 best... lists.

== E.G.O.T. ==
=== Academy Awards ===
The Academy Awards, popularly known as the Oscars, are presented annually by the American Academy of Motion Picture Arts and Sciences (AMPAS) to recognize excellence of professionals in the film industry. Hepburn was nominated for five competitive awards, winning once. In addition, she was the recipient of the Jean Hersholt Humanitarian Award posthumously. Hepburn's son Sean H. Ferrer accepted the award on her behalf.

Year	Category	Nominated work	Result	Ref.
1954	Best Actress	Roman Holiday	Won	
1955	Best Actress	Sabrina	Nominated	
1960	Best Actress	The Nun's Story	Nominated	
1962	Best Actress	Breakfast at Tiffany's	Nominated	
1968	Best Actress	Wait Until Dark	Nominated	
1993	Jean Hersholt Humanitarian Award		Honored	

=== Emmy Awards ===
The Primetime Emmy Awards, presented by the Academy of Television Arts & Sciences (ATAS), honor American prime time television entertainment. Hepburn was the recipient of one Emmy Award posthumously.

Year	Category	Nominated work	Result	Ref.
1993	Outstanding Individual Achievement – Informational Programming	Gardens of the World with Audrey Hepburn (episode: "Flower Gardens")	Won	

=== Grammy Awards ===
The Grammy Awards are presented annually by the National Academy of Recording Arts and Sciences of the United States for outstanding achievements in the music industry. Hepburn won one Grammy Award posthumously.

Year	Category	Nominated work	Result	Ref.
1994	Best Spoken Word Album for Children	Audrey Hepburn's Enchanted Tales	Won	

=== Tony Awards ===
The Antoinette Perry Awards for Excellence in Theatre, more commonly known as the Tony Awards, recognize achievement in live American theatre, and are presented by the American Theatre Wing and The Broadway League. Hepburn won one competitive Tony Award, and was the recipient of the Special Tony Award in 1968.

Year	Category	Nominated work	Result	Ref.
1954	Best Actress in a Play	Ondine	Won	
Non-competitive awards
1968	Special Tony Award		Recipient	

== Major associations ==
=== BAFTA Awards ===
The BAFTA Awards, presented by the British Academy of Film and Television Arts (BAFTA), is an annual awards show to celebrate excellence in film, television, television craft, video games, and forms of animation. Hepburn was nominated five times for a competitive award, winning three. In addition, she was the recipient of a Lifetime Achievement Award in 1992.

Year	Category	Nominated work	Result	Ref.
1954	Best British Actress	Roman Holiday	Won	
1955	Best British Actress	Sabrina	Nominated	
1957	Best British Actress	War and Peace	Nominated	
1960	Best British Actress	The Nun's Story	Won	
1965	Best British Actress	Charade	Won	
Non-competitive awards
1992	BAFTA Special Award		Recipient	

=== Golden Globe Awards ===
The Golden Globes are presented annually by the Hollywood Foreign Press Association (HFPA) to recognize outstanding achievements in the entertainment industry, both domestic and foreign, and to focus wide public attention upon the best in motion pictures and television. Hepburn was a 10-time nominee, winning twice. In addition, she received the Cecil B. DeMille Award in 1990.

Year	Category	Nominated work	Result	Ref.
1954	Best Actress in a Motion Picture – Drama	Roman Holiday	Won	
1955	Henrietta Award for World Film Favorite – Female		Won	
1957	Best Actress in a Motion Picture – Drama	War and Peace	Nominated	
1958	Best Actress in a Motion Picture – Musical or Comedy	Love in the Afternoon	Nominated	
1960	Best Actress in a Motion Picture – Drama	The Nun's Story	Nominated	
1962	Best Actress in a Motion Picture – Musical or Comedy	Breakfast at Tiffany's	Nominated	
1964	Best Actress in a Motion Picture – Musical or Comedy	Charade	Nominated	
1965	Best Actress in a Motion Picture – Musical or Comedy	My Fair Lady	Nominated	
1968	Best Actress in a Motion Picture – Musical or Comedy	Two for the Road	Nominated	
1968	Best Actress in a Motion Picture – Drama	Wait Until Dark	Nominated	
Non-competitive awards
1990	Cecil B. DeMille Award		Recipient	

=== New York Film Critics Circle Awards ===
The New York Film Critics' Circle Awards are given annually to honor excellence in cinema worldwide by an organization of film reviewers from New York City-based publications. Hepburn won two of her five competitive nominations.

Year	Category	Nominated work	Result	Ref.
1953	Best Actress	Roman Holiday	Won	
1954	Best Actress	Sabrina	Nominated	
1956	Best Actress	War and Peace	Nominated	
1959	Best Actress	The Nun's Story	Won	
1964	Best Actress	My Fair Lady	Nominated	

=== Screen Actors Guild Awards ===
The Screen Actors Guild Awards, presented by the Screen Actors Guild (SAG), recognize outstanding performances by its members. Hepburn was the recipient of a posthumous Life Achievement Award.

Year	Category	Nominated work	Result	Ref.
1993	Life Achievement Award		Won	

=== Other arts recognition ===
In recognition of her work in the performing arts, besides those awards aforementioned, Hepburn received several other honors. In 1959, she won the Silver Shell for Best Actress at the San Sebastian International Film Festival for her work in The Nun's Story. In 1987, she was awarded the Commander of the National French Order of Arts and Letters (French: Commandeur de L'Ordre des Arts et des Lettres), and was a Gala Film Tribute honoree. In 1991, she received the American Academy of Achievement's Golden Plate Award, an honorary Bambi Award, and was an Honoree at both the Film Society of Lincoln Center's Gala Tribute and the USA Film Festival's Master Screen. Then, in 1992, Hepburn was awarded The George Eastman Award, given by George Eastman House for distinguished contribution to the art of film. She was posthumously awarded the 1996 Women in Film's Crystal Award for her efforts in expanding the role of women within the entertainment industry.

== Humanitarian recognition ==
In recognition of her humanitarian work, Hepburn received the following honors:
1976

- Variety Club of New York's Humanitarian Award

1988

- UNICEF's International Danny Kaye Award for Children

1989

- Institute for Human Understanding's International Humanitarian Award

1990

- UNICEF's seventh annual ball honored Hepburn

1991

- Washington UNICEF Council's Children's Champion Award
- Certificate of Merit for UNICEF Ambassadorship
- Variety Clubs International's Humanitarian Award
- UNICEF's Sidaci per L'infanzia" (Mayors for Children) Award
- Children's Institute International's Champion of Children Award
- Sigma Theta Tau International Audrey Hepburn Award named after Hepburn, given to individuals in recognition for their international work on behalf of children

1992

- Honorary Chair and Speaker at Alan Shawn Feinstein World Hunger Awards held at Brown University
- Presidential Medal of Freedom

1993

- The Pearl S. Buck Foundation's Women's Award

2000

- Women's International Center's Living Legacy Award for "stunning contributions to humanity and enduring legacies given to humankind"

2002

- Bronze sculpture entitled "The Spirit of Audrey", by sculptor John Kennedy, installed at the public plaza at UNICEF headquarters in New York

2006

- Sustainable Style Foundation inaugurated the Style & Substance Award in honour of Audrey Hepburn to recognize high-profile individuals who work to improve the quality of life for children around the world (the award was given to Hepburn posthumously and received by the Audrey Hepburn Children's Fund)

== Style recognition ==
- Hepburn was the second of only four people to wear the Tiffany Diamond
- Hepburn was a member of the International Best Dressed List, and was elevated into its Hall of Fame in 1961
- Included in People's "50 Most Beautiful People in the World" in 1990
- Received the Council of Fashion Designers of America's Lifetime of Style Award in 1992

== Other honours ==
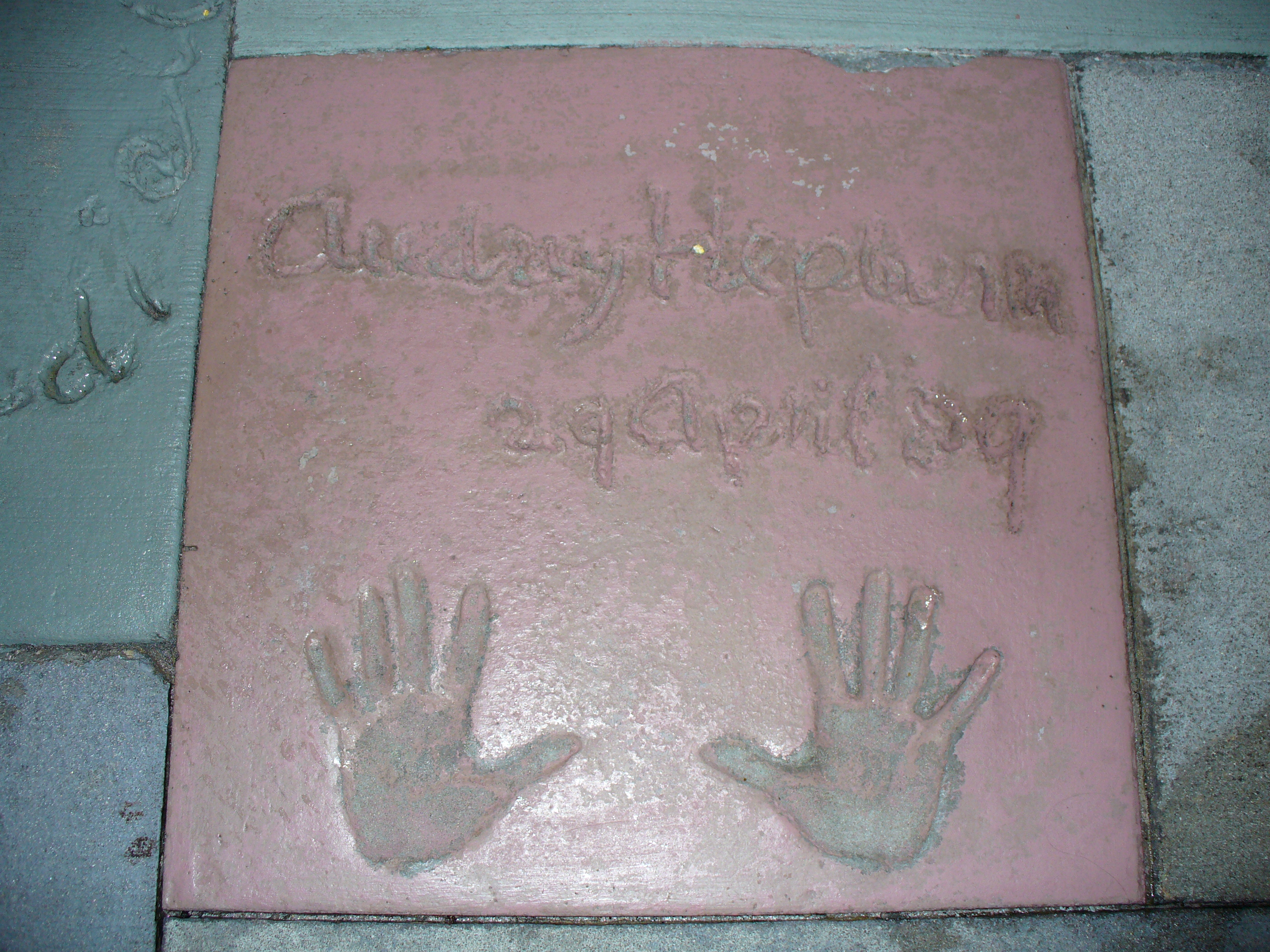
Hepburn's handprints in front of The Great Movie Ride at Walt Disney World's Disney's Hollywood Studios theme park.

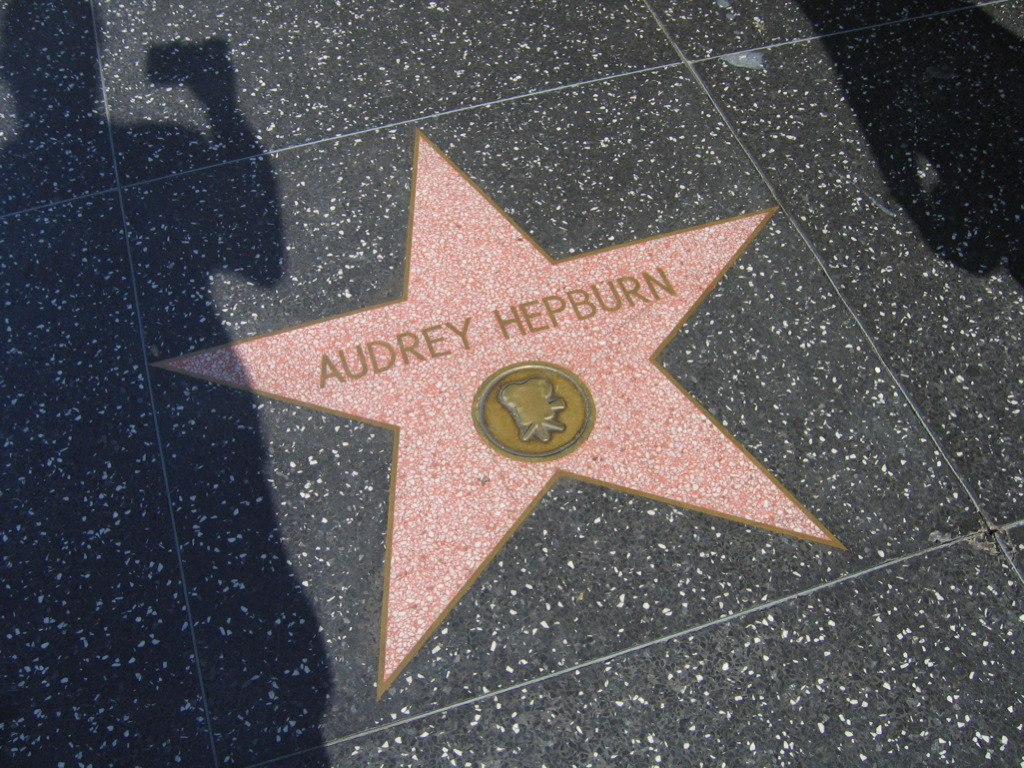
Hepburn's star on the Hollywood Walk of Fame

- She has a star on the Hollywood Walk of Fame, at 1652 Vine Street.
- She received "The Key to the City" in five American cities: Chicago and Indianapolis in 1990; Fort Worth, Texas, in 1991; and San Francisco and Providence, Rhode Island, in 1992.
- In 1987, she was made a Commander of the Order of Arts and Letters from France
- In 1990, she was honored with a new hybrid tulip in her name, as a tribute to the actress's career and to her long-time work on behalf of UNICEF, according to the Netherlands Flowerbulb Information Center. An official dedication ceremony took place at her family's former mansion Huis Doorn in Doorn, Netherlands.
- In 1991, she was honored with a rose in her name. The rose was bred by Jerry F. Twomey at Leucadia, California.
- In 1991, she received the Golden Plate Award of the American Academy of Achievement. Her Golden Plate was presented by Awards Council member Ralph Lauren.
- "Audrey Hepburn Day" was proclaimed on 28 February 1991 by the mayor of Fort Worth, Texas, and on 10 April 1992 by the mayor of Providence, Rhode Island.
- In 2003, the United States Postal Service issued a stamp illustrated by Michael J. Deas honouring her as a Hollywood legend and humanitarian. It has a drawing of her which is based on a publicity photo from the movie Sabrina. Hepburn is one of the few non-Americans to be so honoured.
- In 2008, Canada Post issued a series of pre-paid postcards based on the work of Yousuf Karsh, one of which was a portrait of Hepburn.
- In Arnhem, there is a square named after Audrey Hepburn.
- KLM named a McDonnell Douglas MD-11 PH-KCE, Audrey Hepburn, in her honour.
