= Audrey Hepburn =

British actress (1929–1993)

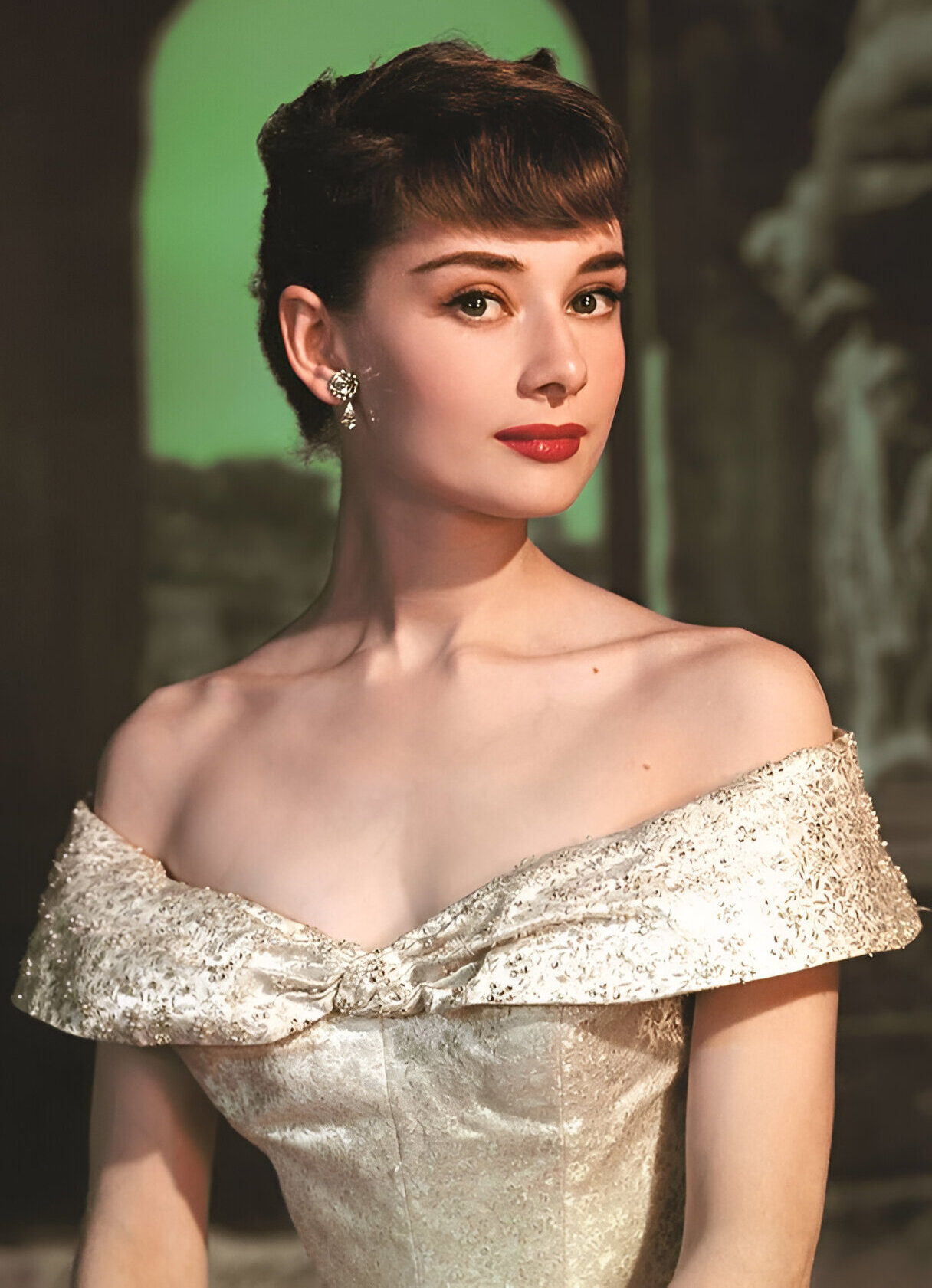
- Hepburn in 1953
- Born: Audrey Kathleen Ruston; 4 May 1929; Ixelles, Brussels, Belgium
- Died: 20 January 1993 (aged 63); Tolochenaz, Vaud, Switzerland
- Resting place: Tolochenaz Cemetery
- Occupations: Actress; humanitarian
- Years active: 1948–1993
- Notable work: Full list
- Spouses: Mel Ferrer (m. 1954; div. 1968) Andrea Dotti (m. 1969; div. 1982)
- Partner: Robert Wolders (1980–1993; her death)
- Children: 2, including Sean Hepburn Ferrer
- Mother: Ella van Heemstra
- Relatives: Aarnoud van Heemstra (grandfather); Emma Ferrer (granddaughter)
- Awards: Full list

Goodwill Ambassador for UNICEF
- In office 1988–1993

Audrey Kathleen Hepburn (née Ruston; 4 May 1929 – 20 January 1993) was a British (Note: When asked about her background, Hepburn identified as half-Dutch, for her mother was a Dutch noblewoman. Furthermore, she spent a significant part of her formative years in the Netherlands and spoke Dutch fluently. She solely held British nationality since at the time of her birth Dutch women were not permitted to pass on their nationality to their children; Dutch law did not change in this regard until 1985. Her ancestry is covered in the "Early life" section.) actress and humanitarian. Recognised as a film and fashion icon, she was ranked by the American Film Institute as the third-greatest female screen legend from the Golden Age of Hollywood. She was inducted into the International Best Dressed Hall of Fame and is one of only a few entertainers who have won competitive Academy, Emmy, Grammy and Tony Awards.

Born into an aristocratic family in Ixelles, Brussels, Hepburn spent parts of her childhood in Belgium, the United Kingdom and the Netherlands. She attended boarding school in Kent from 1936 to 1939. Hepburn returned to the Netherlands at the outbreak of the Second World War. She studied ballet at the Arnhem Conservatory during the war. By 1944, Hepburn was performing ballet to raise money to support the resistance. She studied with Sonia Gaskell in Amsterdam from 1945 to 1948 and then with Marie Rambert in London.

Hepburn began performing as a chorus girl in West End musicals and later made minor appearances in several films. She rose to stardom in the romantic comedy Roman Holiday (1953) alongside Gregory Peck, for which she became the first actress to win an Academy Award, a Golden Globe Award and a BAFTA Award for the same performance. The same year, Hepburn won a Tony Award for Best Leading Actress in a Play for her performance in Ondine. She went on to star in a number of successful films, such as Sabrina (1954), with Humphrey Bogart and William Holden; Funny Face (1957), a musical with Fred Astaire in which she sang her own parts; the drama The Nun's Story (1959); the romantic comedy Breakfast at Tiffany's (1961); the thriller-romance Charade (1963), opposite Cary Grant; and the musical My Fair Lady (1964).

In 1967, Hepburn starred in the thriller Wait Until Dark, receiving Academy Award, Golden Globe, and BAFTA nominations. After that role, she only occasionally appeared in films, one being Robin and Marian (1976) with Sean Connery. Her last recorded performances were in Always (1989), an American romantic fantasy film directed and produced by Steven Spielberg, and the 1990 documentary television series Gardens of the World with Audrey Hepburn, for which she won a Primetime Emmy Award for Outstanding Individual Achievement – Informational Programming. Hepburn won three BAFTA Awards for Best British Actress in a Leading Role and BAFTA's Lifetime Achievement Award. She also won two Golden Globes and the Cecil B. DeMille Award. She was also the recipient of a Screen Actors Guild Life Achievement Award and the Special Tony Award. In 1994, Hepburn's contributions to a spoken-word recording titled Audrey Hepburn's Enchanted Tales earned her a posthumous Grammy Award for Best Spoken Word Album for Children.

Later in life, Hepburn devoted much of her time to charity. She contributed to UNICEF from 1954 onwards. Between 1988 and 1992, she worked in some of the poorest communities of Africa, South America, and Asia. In December 1992, Hepburn received the US Presidential Medal of Freedom in recognition of her work as a UNICEF Goodwill Ambassador. One month later, Hepburn died of appendix cancer at her home in Tolochenaz, Switzerland.

== Early life ==
=== 1929–1938: Family and early childhood ===
Audrey Kathleen Ruston (later, Hepburn-Ruston) was born at number 48 Rue Keyenveld in Ixelles, Brussels, Belgium. She was known to her family as Adriaantje. Raised Protestant, she remained one throughout her life.

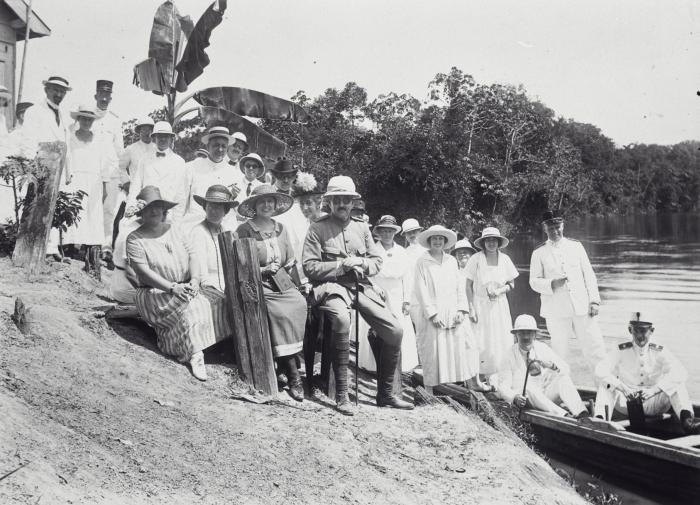
Hepburn's grandfather Aarnoud van Heemstra was the governor of Dutch Guiana.

Hepburn's mother, Baroness Ella van Heemstra (1900–1984), was a Dutch noblewoman. She was the daughter of Baron Aarnoud van Heemstra (1871–1957), who had served as the mayor of Arnhem from 1910 to 1920 and as the governor of Dutch Guiana from 1921 to 1928, and Baroness Elbrig Willemine Henriette van Asbeck (1873–1939), a granddaughter of Count Dirk van Hogendorp (1797–1845). At the age of 19, she married Jonkheer Hendrik Gustaaf Adolf Quarles van Ufford, an oil executive based in Batavia, Dutch East Indies, where the couple subsequently lived. Before divorcing in 1925, they had two sons, Jonkheer Arnoud Robert Alexander "Alex" Quarles van Ufford (1920–1979) and Jonkheer Ian Edgar Bruce Quarles van Ufford (1924–2010).

Hepburn's father, Joseph Victor Anthony Ruston (1889–1980), was a British subject born in Auschitz, Kingdom of Bohemia, Austro-Hungarian Empire. He was the son of Victor John George Ruston, who was of British and German-Austrian background, and Anna Juliana Franziska Karolina Wels, who was of German-Austrian origin and was born in Kovarce, Kingdom of Hungary. He was an Honorary British Consul in Semarang, Dutch East Indies, from 1923 to 1924. Joseph was married to Cornelia Bisschop, a Dutch heiress, prior to his marriage to Ella. He later changed his surname to the more "aristocratic" double-barrelled Hepburn-Ruston, perhaps at Ella's insistence, due to mistakenly believing himself descended from James Hepburn, 4th Earl of Bothwell. (Note: Spoto writes that Hepburn's maternal great-grandmother's maiden name was Kathleen Hepburn.)

Ella and Joseph married in Batavia in 1926. Joseph was working for a trading company at the time. Soon after the marriage, the couple moved to Europe, where he began working for a loan company; reportedly, tin merchants MacLaine, Watson, and Company in London. After a year in London, they moved to Brussels, where he had been assigned to open a branch office. After three years spent travelling between Brussels, Arnhem, The Hague and London, the family settled in the suburban Brussels municipality of Linkebeek in 1932. Hepburn's early childhood was sheltered and privileged. Due to Joseph's job, the family travelled back and forth among three countries, enhancing her multinational background. (Note: Walker writes that it is unclear for what kind of company Joseph worked; he was listed as a "financial adviser" in a Dutch business directory, and the family often travelled among the three countries.)

In the mid-1930s, Ella and Joseph recruited and collected donations for the British Union of Fascists (BUF). Ella met Adolf Hitler and wrote favourable articles about him for the BUF. Joseph left the family abruptly in 1935 after a "scene" in Brussels. He subsequently moved to London, where he became more deeply involved in Fascist activity and never visited Hepburn abroad. The same year, Ella moved to her family's estate in Arnhem with Hepburn and sent Alex and Ian to The Hague to live with relatives. Joseph wanted Hepburn to be educated in the United Kingdom, so in 1937, she was sent to live in Kent, where she, known as Audrey Ruston or "Little Audrey", was educated at a small private school in the village of Elham. Ella and Joseph officially divorced the next year. Later in her life, Hepburn often spoke of the effect on a child of being "dumped" as "children need two parents"; she stated that Joseph's departure was "the most traumatic event of my life". In the 1960s, Hepburn renewed contact with Joseph after locating him in Dublin, Ireland, through the Red Cross; although he remained emotionally detached, she supported him financially until his death.

=== 1939–1945: Experiences during World War II ===
After Britain declared war on Germany in September 1939, Hepburn's mother moved her daughter back to Arnhem in the hope that, as during the First World War, the Netherlands would remain neutral and be spared a German attack. While there, Hepburn attended the Arnhem Conservatory from 1939 to 1945. She had begun taking ballet lessons during her last years at boarding school, and continued training in Arnhem under the tutelage of Winja Marova, becoming her "star pupil". After the Germans invaded the Netherlands in 1940, Hepburn used the name Edda van Heemstra, because an "English-sounding" name was considered dangerous during the German occupation. Her family was profoundly affected by the occupation, with Hepburn later stating that "had we known that we were going to be occupied for five years, we might have all shot ourselves. We thought it might be over next week… six months… next year… that's how we got through".

In 1942, her uncle, Otto van Limburg Stirum (husband of her mother's older sister, Miesje), was executed in retaliation for an act of sabotage by the resistance movement; while he had not been involved in the act, he was targeted due to his family's prominence in Dutch society. These family events were the turning point in the attitude of Hepburn's mother, who had flirted with Nazism up to this point. Hepburn's half-brother Ian was deported to Berlin to work in a German labour camp, and her other half-brother Alex went into hiding to avoid the same fate.

"We saw young men put against the wall and shot, and they'd close the street and then open it, and you could pass by again... Don't discount anything awful you hear or read about the Nazis. It's worse than you could ever imagine."

— Hepburn on the Nazi occupation of the Netherlands

After her uncle's death, Hepburn, Ella, and Miesje left Arnhem to live with her grandfather, Baron Aarnoud van Heemstra, in nearby Velp. Around that time Hepburn gave silent dance performances that reportedly raised money for the Dutch resistance effort. It was long believed that she participated in the Dutch resistance itself, but in 2016 the Airborne Museum 'Hartenstein' reported that after extensive research it had not found any evidence of such activities. A 2019 book by Robert Matzen provided evidence, based on Hepburn's personal statements, that she had supported the resistance by giving "underground concerts" to raise money, delivering the underground newspaper, and taking messages and food to downed Allied flyers hiding in the woodlands north of Velp. She also volunteered at a hospital that was the center of resistance activities in Velp, and, according to Hepburn, her family temporarily hid a British paratrooper in their home during the Battle of Arnhem. Matzen also claims that Hepburn carried messages for the Dutch Resistance, including to downed British paratroopers.

In addition to other traumatic events, she witnessed the transportation of Dutch Jews to concentration camps, later stating that "more than once I was at the station seeing trainloads of Jews being transported, seeing all these faces over the top of the wagon. I remember, very sharply, one little boy standing with his parents on the platform, very pale, very blond, wearing a coat that was much too big for him, and he stepped on the train. I was a child observing a child."

After the Allied landing on D-Day, living conditions grew worse, and Arnhem was subsequently heavily damaged during Operation Market Garden. During the 1944–1945 Dutch famine, the Germans hindered or reduced the already limited food and fuel supplies available to civilians in retaliation for Dutch railway strikes intended to disrupt the occupation. Like others, Hepburn's family resorted to making flour out of tulip bulbs to bake cakes and biscuits, a source of starchy carbohydrates; Dutch doctors provided recipes for using tulip bulbs throughout the famine. Suffering from the effects of malnutrition, after the war ended Hepburn became gravely ill with jaundice, anaemia, oedema, and a respiratory infection. In October 1945, a letter from Ella asking for help was received by Micky Burn, a former lover and British Army officer with whom she had corresponded while he was a prisoner of war in Colditz Castle. He sent back thousands of cigarettes, which she was able to sell on the black market and thus buy the penicillin which saved Hepburn's life. The Van Heemstra family's financial situation changed significantly through the occupation, during which time many of their properties (including their principal estate in Arnhem) were damaged or destroyed.

== Entertainment career ==
=== 1945–1952: Ballet studies and early acting roles ===
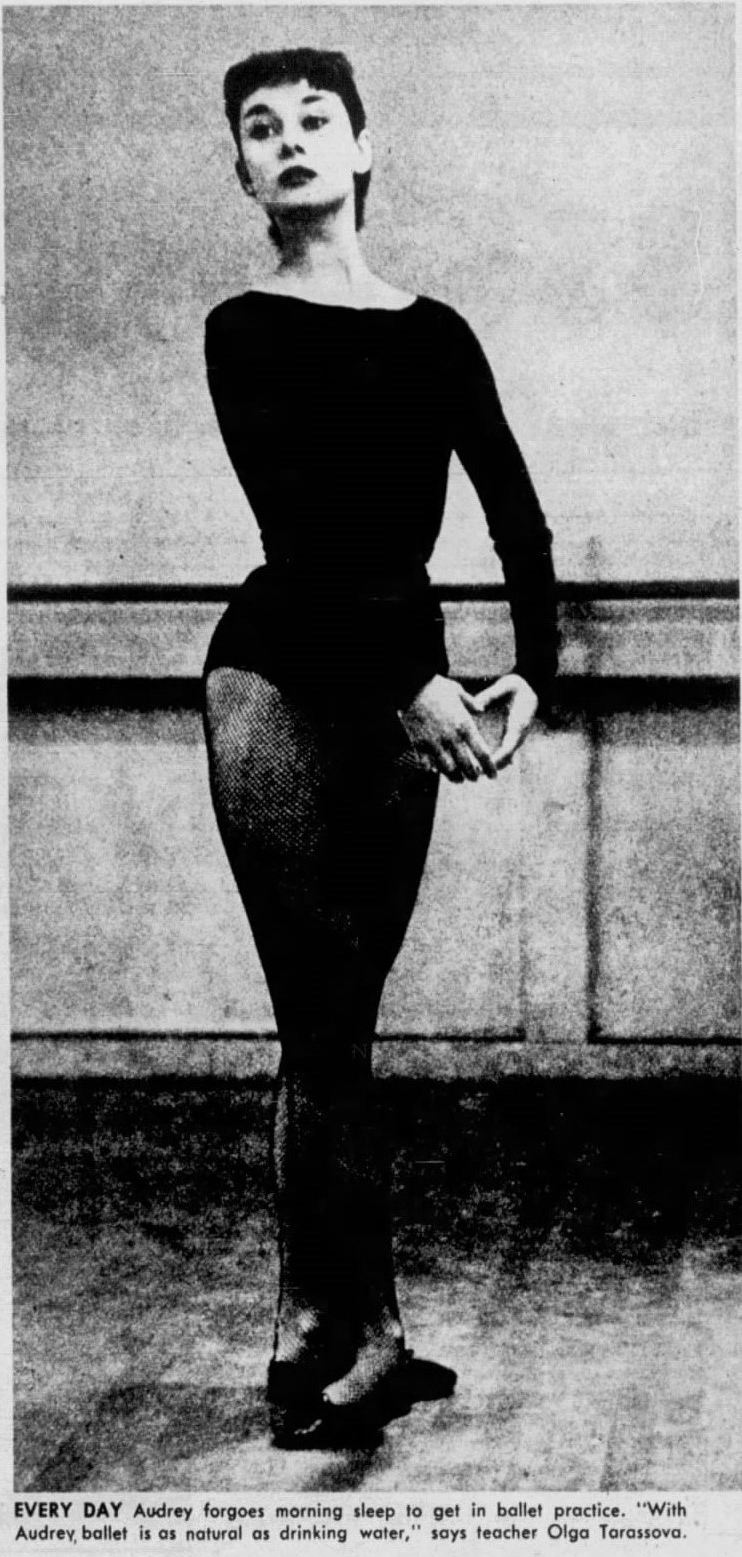
Newspaper clipping, 9 March 1952

After the war ended in 1945, Hepburn moved with her mother and siblings to Amsterdam, where she began ballet training under Sonia Gaskell, a leading figure in Dutch ballet, and Russian teacher Olga Tarasova. Due to the loss of the family fortune, Ella had to support them by working as a cook and housekeeper for a wealthy family. Hepburn made her film debut playing an air stewardess in Dutch in Seven Lessons (1948), an educational travel film made by Charles van der Linden and Henry Josephson.

Later that year, Hepburn moved to London after accepting a ballet scholarship with Ballet Rambert, which was then based in Notting Hill. (Note: She had been offered the scholarship already in 1945, but had had to decline it due to "some uncertainty regarding her national status".) She supported herself with part-time work as a model, and dropped "Ruston" from her surname. After she was told by Rambert that despite her talent, her height and weak constitution (the after-effect of wartime malnutrition) would make the status of prima ballerina unattainable, she decided to concentrate on acting. While Ella worked in menial jobs to support them, Hepburn appeared as a chorus girl in the West End musical theatre revues High Button Shoes (1948) at the London Hippodrome, and Cecil Landeau's Sauce Tartare (1949) and Sauce Piquante (1950) at the Cambridge Theatre. Also, in 1950, she worked as a dancer in an exceptionally "ambitious" revue, Summer Nights, at Ciro's London, a prominent nightclub.

During her theatrical work, she took elocution lessons with actor Felix Aylmer to develop her voice. After being spotted by the Ealing Studios casting director, Margaret Harper-Nelson, while performing in Sauce Piquante, Hepburn was registered as a freelance actress with the Associated British Picture Corporation (ABPC). She appeared in the BBC Television play The Silent Village, and in minor roles in the films One Wild Oat, Laughter in Paradise, Young Wives' Tale, and The Lavender Hill Mob (all 1951). She was cast in her first major supporting role in Thorold Dickinson's Secret People (1952), as a prodigious ballerina, performing all of her own dancing sequences.

Hepburn then took a small role in a bilingual film, Monte Carlo Baby (French: Nous Irons à Monte Carlo, 1952), which was filmed in Monte Carlo. Coincidentally, French novelist Colette was at the Hôtel de Paris in Monte Carlo during the filming, and decided to cast Hepburn in the title role in the Broadway play Gigi. Hepburn went into rehearsals having never spoken on stage, and required private coaching. When Gigi opened at the Fulton Theatre on 24 November 1951, she received praise for her performance, despite criticism that the stage version was inferior to the French film adaptation. Life called her a "hit", while The New York Times stated that "her quality is so winning and so right that she is the success of the evening". Hepburn also received a Theatre World Award for the role. The play ran for 219 performances, closing on 31 May 1952, before going on tour, which began 13 October 1952 in Pittsburgh and visited Cleveland, Chicago, Detroit, Washington, D. C., and Los Angeles, before closing on 16 May 1953 in San Francisco.

=== 1953–1960: Roman Holiday and stardom ===
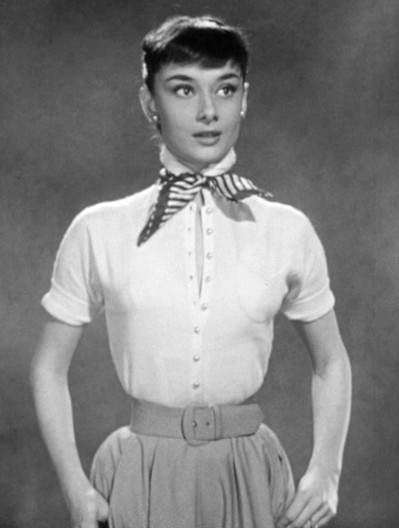
Hepburn in a screen test for Roman Holiday (1953) which was also used as promotional material for the film

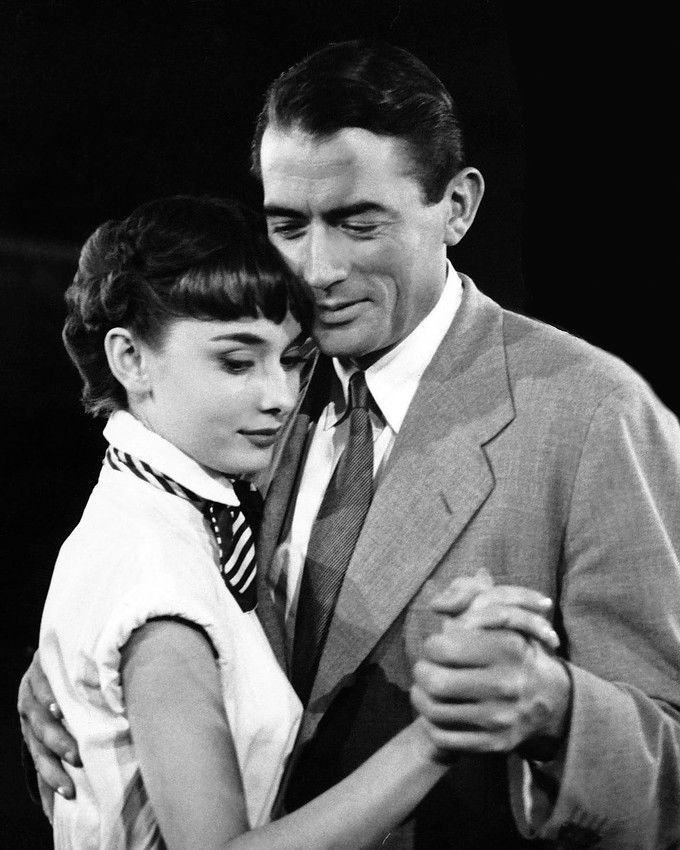
Hepburn and Gregory Peck in a promotional still for Roman Holiday (1953)

Hepburn had her first starring role in Roman Holiday (1953), playing Princess Ann, a European princess who escapes the reins of royalty and has a wild night out with an American newsman (Gregory Peck). On 18 September 1951, shortly after Secret People was finished but before its premiere, Thorold Dickinson made a screen test with the young starlet and sent it to director William Wyler, who was in Rome preparing Roman Holiday. Wyler wrote a glowing note of thanks to Dickinson, saying that "as a result of the test, a number of the producers at Paramount have expressed interest in casting her." The producers of the film had initially wanted Elizabeth Taylor for the role, but Wyler was so impressed by Hepburn's screen test that he cast her instead. Wyler later commented, "She had everything I was looking for: charm, innocence, and talent. She also was very funny. She was absolutely enchanting, and we said, 'That's the girl!'" Originally, the film was to have had only Gregory Peck's name above its title, with "Introducing Audrey Hepburn" beneath in smaller font. Peck suggested Wyler elevate her to equal billing so her name appears before the title, and in type as large as his: "You've got to change that because she'll be a big star, and I'll look like a big jerk."

The film was a box-office success, and Hepburn gained critical acclaim for her portrayal, unexpectedly winning the Academy Award for Best Actress, the BAFTA Award for Best British Actress in a Leading Role, and the Golden Globe Award for Best Actress in a Motion Picture – Drama. In his review in The New York Times, A. H. Weiler wrote: "Although she is not precisely a newcomer to films, Audrey Hepburn, the British actress who is being starred for the first time as Princess Ann, is a slender, elfin, and wistful beauty, alternately regal and childlike in her profound appreciation of newly-found, simple pleasures and love. Although she bravely smiles her acknowledgement of the end of that affair, she remains a pitifully lonely figure facing a stuffy future."

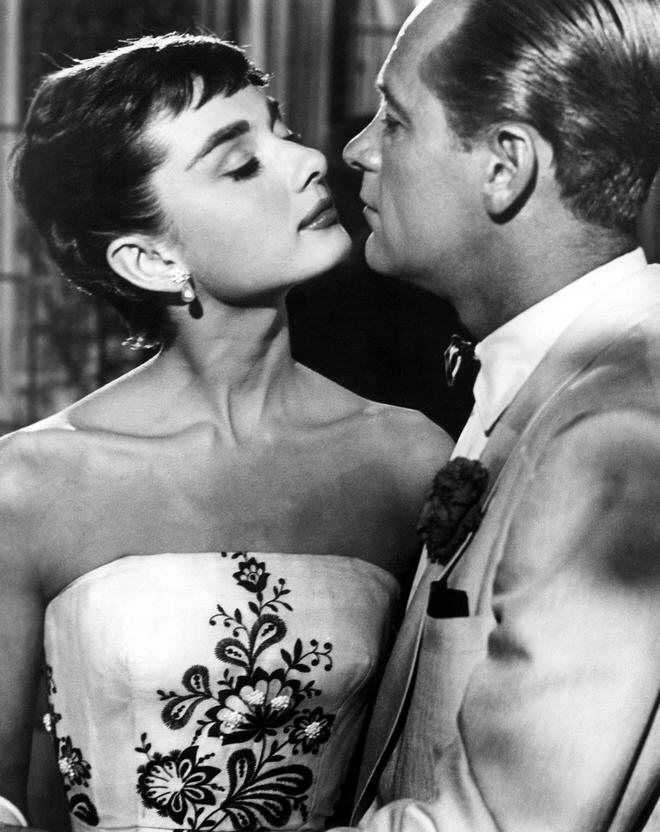
Hepburn with co-star William Holden in the film Sabrina (1954)

Hepburn was signed to a seven-picture contract with Paramount, with 12 months in between films to allow her time for stage work. She was featured on 7 September 1953 cover of Time magazine, and also became known for her personal style. Following her success in Roman Holiday, Hepburn starred in Billy Wilder's romantic Cinderella-story comedy Sabrina (1954), in which wealthy brothers (Humphrey Bogart and William Holden) compete for the affections of their chauffeur's innocent daughter (Hepburn). For her performance, she was nominated for the Academy Award for Best Actress and won the BAFTA Award for Best Actress in a Leading Role. Bosley Crowther of The New York Times stated that she was "a young lady of extraordinary range of sensitive and moving expressions within such a frail and slender frame. She is even more luminous as the daughter and pet of the servants' hall than she was as a princess last year, and no more than that can be said."

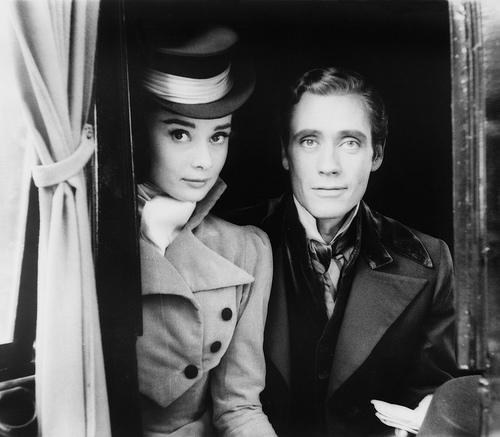
Mel Ferrer and Hepburn in War and Peace (1956)

Hepburn also returned to the stage in 1954, playing a water nymph who falls in love with a human in Jean Giraudoux's fantasy play Ondine at the 46th Street Theatre on Broadway. Ondine opened on February 18, 1954, and closed on July 3, 1954, after 157 performances. A critic for The New York Times commented that "somehow, Miss Hepburn is able to translate [its intangibles] into the language of the theatre without artfulness or precociousness. She gives a pulsing performance that is all grace and enchantment, disciplined by an instinct for the realities of the stage". Her performance won her the Tony Award for Best Actress in a Play three days after she won the Academy Award for Roman Holiday, making her one of three actresses to receive the Academy and Tony Awards for Best Actress in the same year (the other two are Shirley Booth and Ellen Burstyn). During the production, Hepburn and her co-star Mel Ferrer began a relationship, and were married on September 25, 1954 in Switzerland.

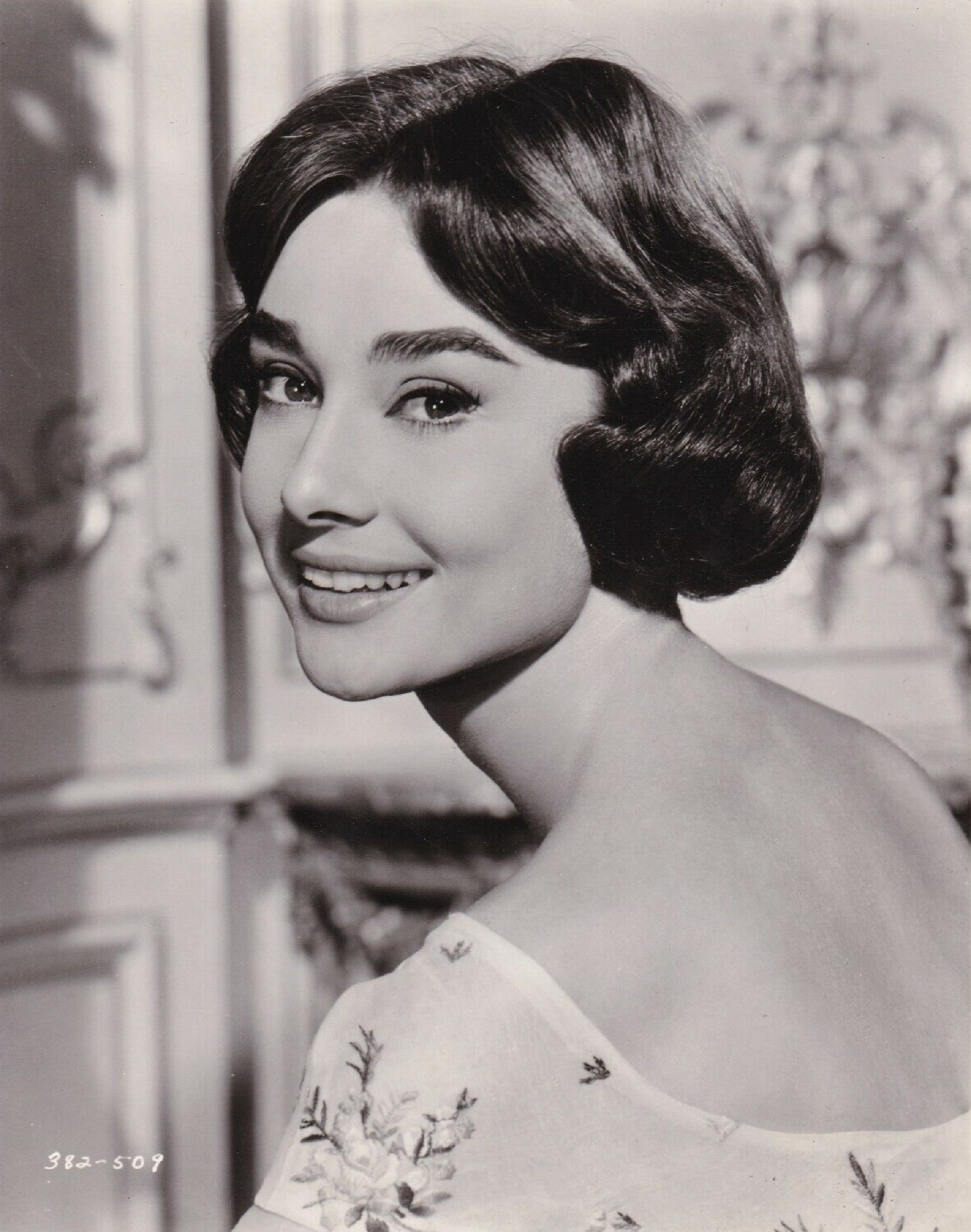
Publicity photo for Love in the Afternoon (1957)

Although she appeared in no new film releases in 1955, Hepburn received the Golden Globe for World Film Favorite that year. Having become one of Hollywood's most popular box-office attractions, she starred in a series of successful films during the remainder of the decade, including her BAFTA- and Golden Globe-nominated role as Natasha Rostova in War and Peace (1956), an adaptation of the Tolstoy novel set during the Napoleonic wars, starring Henry Fonda and her husband Mel Ferrer. She exhibited her dancing abilities in her debut musical film, Funny Face (1957), wherein Fred Astaire, a fashion photographer, discovers a beatnik bookshop clerk (Hepburn) who, lured by a free trip to Paris, becomes a beautiful model. Hepburn starred in another romantic comedy, Love in the Afternoon (also 1957), alongside Gary Cooper and Maurice Chevalier.

Hepburn played Sister Luke in The Nun's Story (1959), which focuses on the character's struggle to succeed as a nun, alongside co-star Peter Finch. She received a third Academy Award nomination and won a second BAFTA Award. A review in Variety reads: "Hepburn has her most demanding film role, and she gives her finest performance", while Henry Hart in Films in Review stated that her performance "will forever silence those who have thought her less an actress than a symbol of the sophisticated child/woman. Her portrayal of Sister Luke is one of the great performances of the screen." Hepburn spent a year researching and working on the role, saying, "I gave more time, energy, and thought to this role than to any of my previous screen performances".

Following The Nun's Story, Hepburn received a lukewarm reception for starring with Anthony Perkins in the romantic adventure Green Mansions (1959), in which she played Rima, a jungle girl who falls in love with a Venezuelan traveller, and The Unforgiven (1960), her only western film, in which she appeared opposite Burt Lancaster and Lillian Gish in a story of racism against a group of Native Americans.

=== 1961–1967: Breakfast at Tiffany's and continued success ===
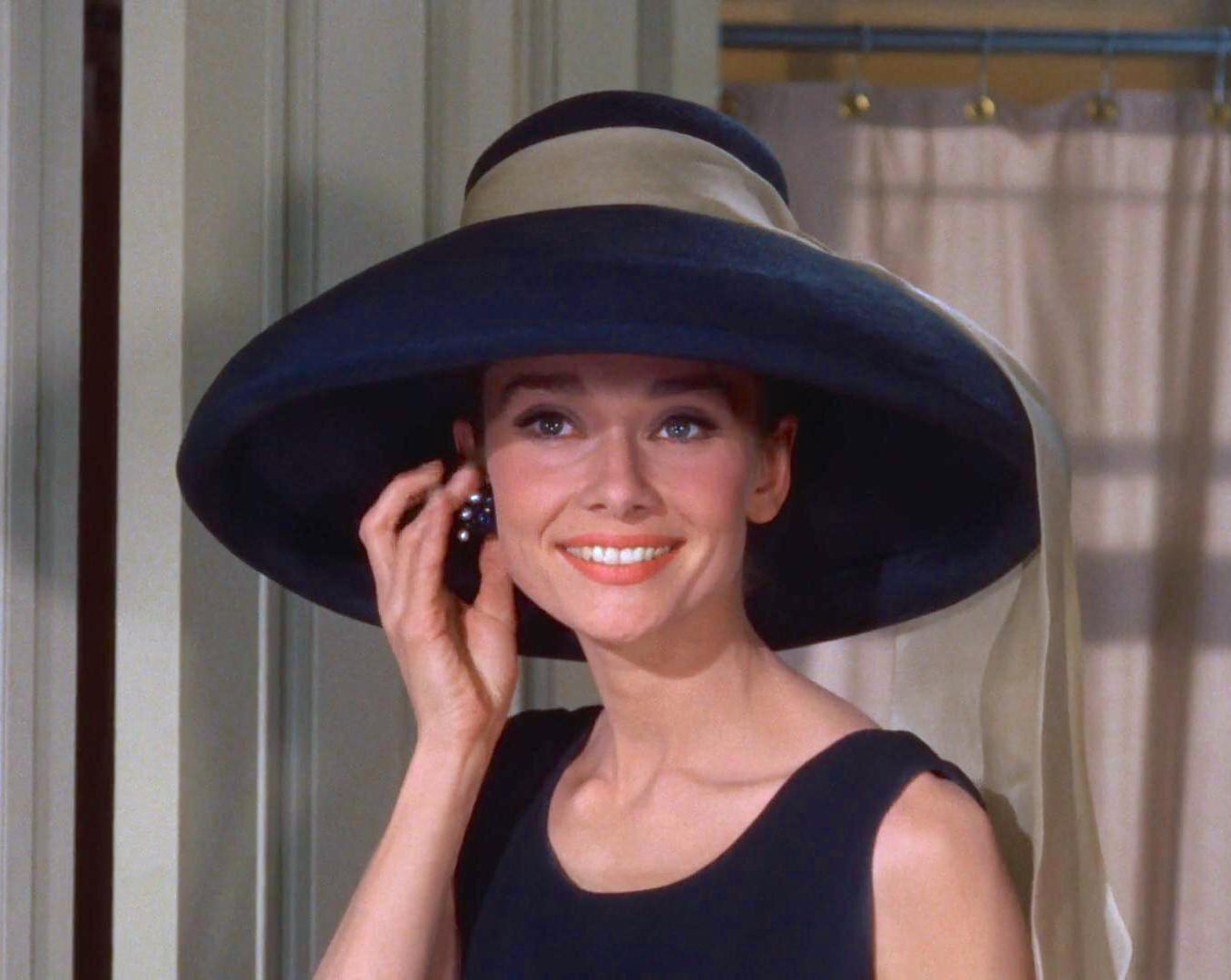
Hepburn as Holly Golightly in Breakfast at Tiffany's (1961)

Hepburn next starred as New Yorker Holly Golightly in Blake Edwards's Breakfast at Tiffany's (1961), a film loosely based on the Truman Capote novella of the same name. Capote disapproved of many changes that were made to sanitize the story for the film adaptation, and would have preferred Marilyn Monroe to have been cast in the role, although he also stated that Hepburn "did a terrific job". The character is considered one of the best-known in American cinema, and a defining role for Hepburn. The dress she wears during the opening credits has been considered an icon of the 20th century, and perhaps the most famous "little black dress" of all time. Hepburn stated that the role was "the jazziest of my career" yet admitted: "I'm an introvert. Playing the extroverted girl was the hardest thing I ever did." She was nominated for the Academy Award for Best Actress for her performance.

Hepburn also starred in William Wyler's drama The Children's Hour (1961), in which she and Shirley MacLaine play teachers whose lives are destroyed after two pupils accuse them of being lesbians. Bosley Crowther of The New York Times writes that the film "is not too well acted", with the exception of Hepburn, who "gives the impression of being sensitive and pure" of its "muted theme". Variety magazine also compliments Hepburn's "soft sensitivity, marvelous projection and emotional understatement", adding that Hepburn and MacLaine "beautifully complement each other".

Charade (full film)

Hepburn next appeared opposite Cary Grant in the comic thriller Charade (1963), playing a young widow pursued by several men who chase after the fortune stolen by her murdered husband. The 59-year-old Grant, who had previously withdrawn from the starring male lead roles in Roman Holiday and Sabrina, was sensitive about his age difference with 34-year-old Hepburn, and was uncomfortable about the romantic interplay. To satisfy his concerns, the filmmakers agreed to alter the screenplay so that Hepburn's character was pursuing him. The film turned out to be a positive experience for him; he said, "All I want for Christmas is another picture with Audrey Hepburn." She won her third BAFTA Award and received her sixth Golden Globe nomination. Bosley Crowther was less kind to her performance, stating that, "Hepburn is cheerfully committed to a mood of how-nuts-can-you-be in an obviously comforting assortment of expensive Givenchy costumes."

Although filmed in the summer of 1962 before Charade, Hepburn reunited with her Sabrina co-star William Holden in Paris When It Sizzles (1964), a screwball comedy in which she played the young assistant of a Hollywood screenwriter, who aids his writer's block by acting out his fantasies of possible plots. Its production was troubled by several problems. Holden unsuccessfully tried to rekindle a romance with the now-married Hepburn, and his alcoholism was beginning to affect his work. After principal photography began, she demanded the dismissal of cinematographer Claude Renoir after seeing what she felt were unflattering dailies. Superstitious, she also insisted on dressing room 55 because that was her lucky number and required that Hubert de Givenchy, her long-time designer, be given a credit in the film for her perfume. Dubbed "marshmallow-weight hokum" by Variety upon its release in April, the film was "uniformly panned" but critics were kinder to Hepburn's performance, describing her as "a refreshingly individual creature in an era of the exaggerated curve".

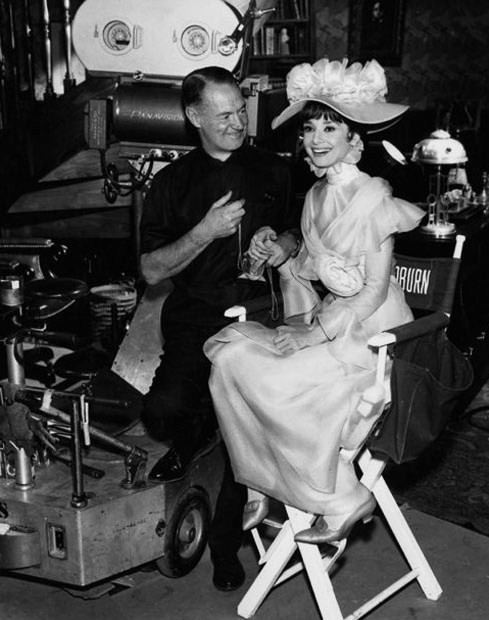
Hepburn with cinematographer Harry Stradling on the set of My Fair Lady (1964)

Hepburn's second film released in 1964 was George Cukor's film adaptation of the stage musical My Fair Lady, which premiered in October. Soundstage wrote that "not since Gone with the Wind has a motion picture created such universal excitement as My Fair Lady", although Hepburn's casting in the role of Cockney flower girl Eliza Doolittle was a source of dispute. Julie Andrews, who had originated the role on stage, was not offered the part because producer Jack L. Warner thought Hepburn was a more "bankable" proposition. Hepburn initially asked Warner to give the role to Andrews but was eventually cast. Further friction was created when, although non-singer Hepburn had sung in Funny Face and had lengthy vocal preparation for the role in My Fair Lady, her vocals were dubbed by Marni Nixon, whose voice was considered more suitable to the role. Hepburn was initially upset and walked off the set when informed. (Note: Overall, about 90 per cent of her singing was dubbed, despite being promised that most of her vocals would be used. Hepburn's voice remains in one line in "I Could Have Danced All Night", in the first verse of "Just You Wait", and in the entirety of its reprise in addition to sing-talking in parts of "The Rain in Spain" in the finished film. When asked about the dubbing of an actress with such distinctive vocal tones, Hepburn frowned and said, "You could tell, couldn't you? And there was Rex, recording all his songs as he acted ... next time —" She bit her lip to prevent her saying more. She later admitted that she would have never accepted the role knowing that Warner intended to have nearly all of her singing dubbed.)

Critics applauded Hepburn's performance. Crowther wrote that, "The happiest thing about [My Fair Lady] is that Audrey Hepburn superbly justifies the decision of Jack Warner to get her to play the title role." Gene Ringgold of Soundstage also commented that, "Audrey Hepburn is magnificent. She is Eliza for the ages", while adding, "Everyone agreed that if Julie Andrews was not to be in the film, Audrey Hepburn was the perfect choice." The reviewer in Time magazine said her "graceful, glamorous performance" was "the best of her career". Andrews won the Academy Award for Best Actress for Mary Poppins over Hepburn at the 1964 Academy Awards, and Hepburn earned Best Actress nominations for the Golden Globes and New York Film Critics Circle awards.

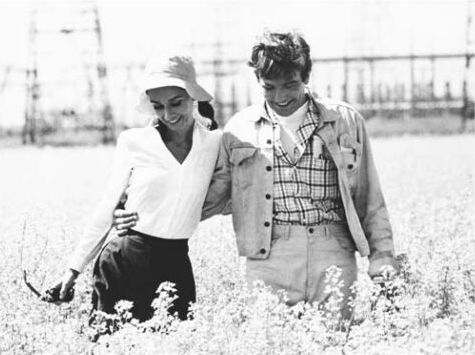
Hepburn and Albert Finney in Two for the Road (1967).

Hepburn appeared in an assortment of genres including the heist comedy How to Steal a Million (1966). Hepburn played the daughter of a famous art collector, whose collection consists entirely of forgeries that are about to be exposed as fakes. Her character plays the part of a dutiful daughter trying to help her father with the help of a man played by Peter O'Toole. The film was followed by two films in 1967. The first was Two for the Road, a non-linear and innovative British dramedy that traces the course of a couple's troubled marriage. Director Stanley Donen said that Hepburn was freer and happier than he had ever seen her, and he credited that to co-star Albert Finney. The second, Wait Until Dark, is a suspense thriller in which Hepburn demonstrated her acting range by playing a terrorized blind woman. Filmed on the brink of her divorce, it was a difficult film for her, as husband Mel Ferrer was its producer. She lost 15 pounds under the stress, but she found solace in co-star Richard Crenna and director Terence Young. Hepburn earned her fifth and final Academy Award nomination; Bosley Crowther affirmed, "Hepburn plays the poignant role, the quickness with which she changes and the skill with which she manifests terror attract sympathy and anxiety to her and give her genuine solidity in the final scenes."

=== 1968–1993: Semi-retirement and final projects ===
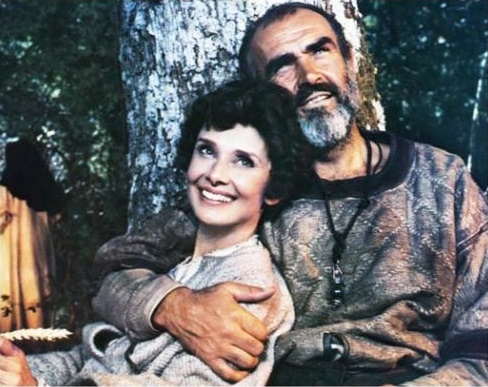
Hepburn and Sean Connery in Robin and Marian (1976)

After 1967, Hepburn chose to devote more time to her family and acted only occasionally. She attempted a comeback playing Maid Marian in the period piece Robin and Marian (1976) with Sean Connery co-starring as Robin Hood, which was moderately successful. Roger Ebert praised Hepburn's chemistry with Connery, writing, "Connery and Hepburn seem to have arrived at a tacit understanding between themselves about their characters. They glow. They really do seem in love. And they project as marvellously complex, fond, tender people; the passage of 20 years has given them grace and wisdom." Hepburn reunited with director Terence Young in the production of Bloodline (1979), sharing top-billing with Ben Gazzara, James Mason, and Romy Schneider. The film, an international intrigue amid the jet-set, was a critical and box-office failure. Hepburn's last starring role in a feature film was opposite Gazzara in the comedy They All Laughed (1981), directed by Peter Bogdanovich. The film was overshadowed by the murder of one of its stars, Dorothy Stratten, and received only a limited release. Six years later, Hepburn co-starred with Robert Wagner in a made-for-television caper film, Love Among Thieves (1987).

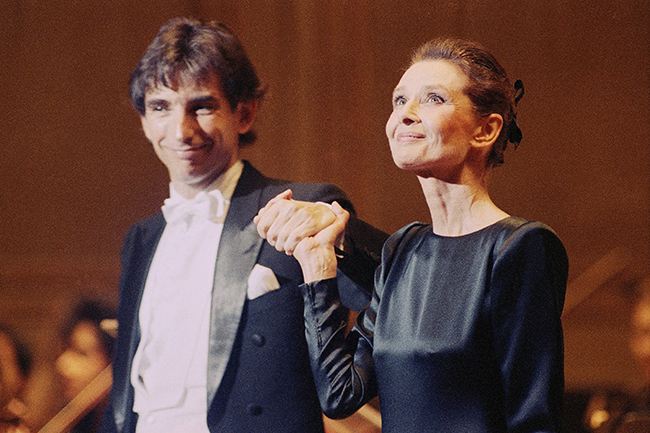
Hepburn with conductor Michael Tilson Thomas in 1990

After finishing her last motion picture role – a cameo appearance as an angel in Steven Spielberg's Always (1989) – Hepburn completed only two more entertainment-related projects, both critically acclaimed. Gardens of the World with Audrey Hepburn was a PBS documentary series, which was filmed on location in seven countries in the spring and summer of 1990. A one-hour special preceded it in March 1991, and the series itself began its national PBS premiere on 24 January 1993, the day of her funeral services in Tolochenaz. For the "Flower Gardens" episode, Hepburn was posthumously awarded the 1993 Primetime Emmy Award for Outstanding Individual Achievement – Informational Programming. The other project was a spoken word album, Audrey Hepburn's Enchanted Tales, which features readings of classic children's stories and was recorded in 1992. It earned her a posthumous Grammy Award for Best Spoken Word Album for Children.

== Humanitarian work ==
In the 1950s, Hepburn narrated two radio programmes for UNICEF, re-telling children's stories of war. In 1989, Hepburn was appointed a Goodwill Ambassador of UNICEF. On her appointment, she stated that she was grateful for receiving international aid after enduring the German occupation as a child, and wanted to show her gratitude to the organisation.

=== 1988–1992 ===
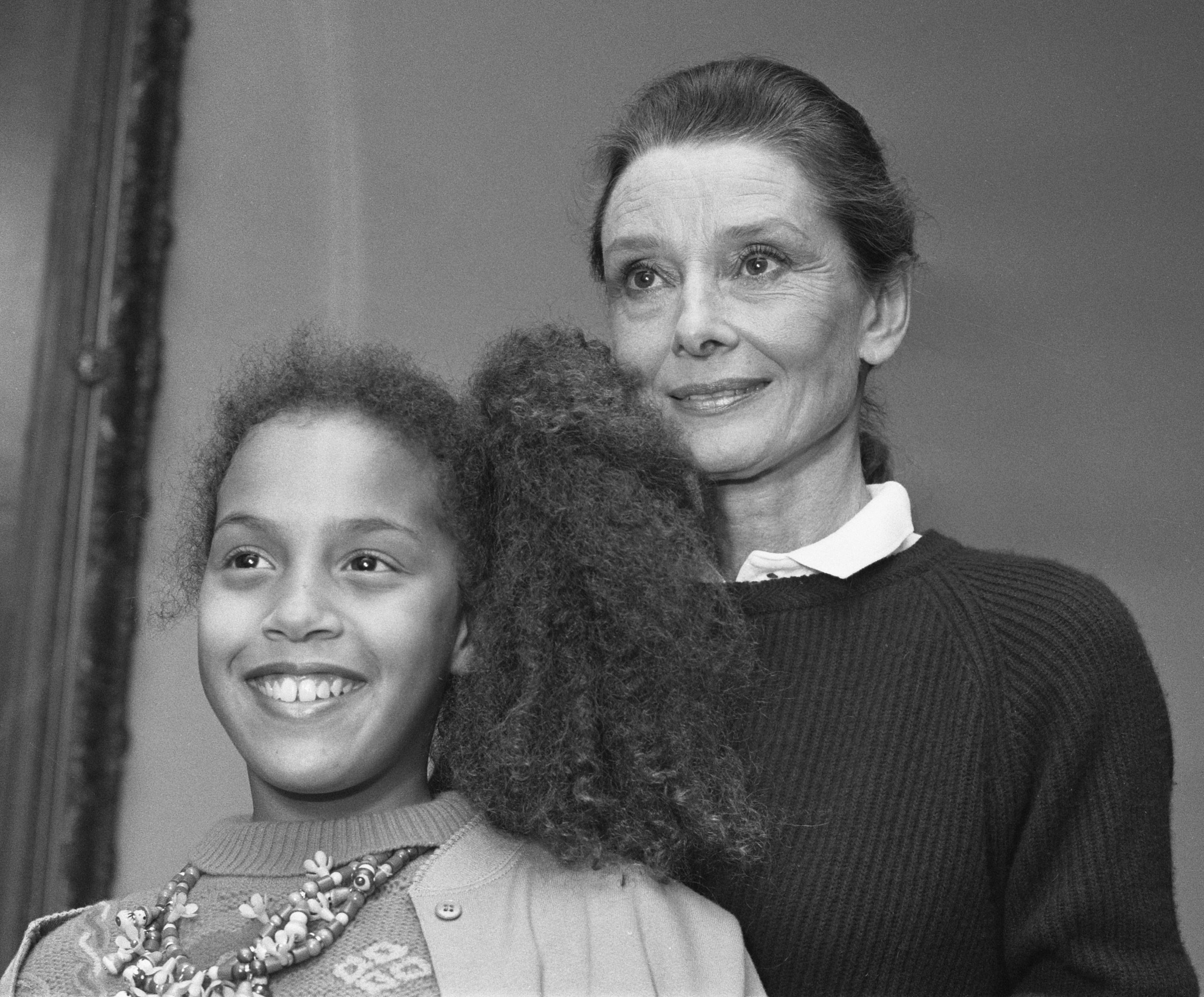
Hepburn receiving UNICEF's International Danny Kaye Award for Children in 1989.

Hepburn's first field mission for UNICEF was to Ethiopia in 1988. She visited an orphanage in Mek'ele that housed 500 starving children and had UNICEF send food. Of the trip, she said,

I have a broken heart. I feel desperate. I can't stand the idea that two million people are in imminent danger of starving to death, many of them children, [and] not because there isn't tons of food sitting in the northern port of Shoa. It can't be distributed. Last spring, Red Cross and UNICEF workers were ordered out of the northern provinces because of two simultaneous civil wars... I went into rebel country and saw mothers and their children who had walked for ten days, even three weeks, looking for food, settling onto the desert floor into makeshift camps where they may die. Horrible. That image is too much for me. The 'Third World' is a term I don't like very much, because we're all one world. I want people to know that the largest part of humanity is suffering.

In August 1988, Hepburn went to Turkey on an immunisation campaign. She called Turkey "the loveliest example" of UNICEF's capabilities. Of the trip, she said, "The army gave us their trucks, the fishmongers gave their wagons for the vaccines, and once the date was set, it took ten days to vaccinate the whole country. Not bad." In October, Hepburn went to South America. Of her experiences in Venezuela and Ecuador, Hepburn told the United States Congress, "I saw tiny mountain communities, slums, and shantytowns receive water systems for the first time by some miracle – and the miracle is UNICEF. I watched boys build their own schoolhouse with bricks and cement provided by UNICEF."

Hepburn toured Central America in February 1989, and met with leaders in Honduras, El Salvador, and Guatemala. In April, she visited Sudan with Wolders as part of a mission called "Operation Lifeline". Because of civil war, food from aid agencies had been cut off. The mission was to ferry food to southern Sudan. Hepburn said, "I saw but one glaring truth: These are not natural disasters but man-made tragedies for which there is only one man-made solution – peace." In October 1989, Hepburn and Wolders went to Bangladesh. John Isaac, a UN photographer, said, "Often the kids would have flies all over them, but she would just go hug them. I had never seen that. Other people had a certain amount of hesitation, but she would just grab them. Children would just come up to hold her hand, touch her – she was like the Pied Piper."

In October 1990, Hepburn went to Vietnam, in an effort to collaborate with the government for national UNICEF-supported immunisation and clean water programmes. In September 1992, four months before she died, Hepburn went to Somalia. Calling it "apocalyptic", she said, "I walked into a nightmare. I have seen famine in Ethiopia and Bangladesh, but I have seen nothing like this – so much worse than I could possibly have imagined. I wasn't prepared for this." Though scarred by what she had seen, Hepburn still had hope stating:

As we move into the twenty-first century, there is much to reflect upon. We look around us and see that the promises of yesterday have to come to pass. People still live in abject poverty, people are still hungry, people still struggle to survive. And among these people we see the children, always the children: their enlarged bellies, their sad eyes, their wise faces that show the suffering, all the suffering they have endured in their short years.

=== Recognition ===
United States president George H. W. Bush presented Hepburn with the Presidential Medal of Freedom in recognition of her work with UNICEF, and the Academy of Motion Picture Arts and Sciences posthumously awarded her the Jean Hersholt Humanitarian Award for her contribution to humanity. In 2002, at the United Nations Special Session on Children, UNICEF honoured Hepburn's legacy of humanitarian work by unveiling a statue, "The Spirit of Audrey", at UNICEF's New York headquarters. Her service for children is also recognised through the United States Fund for UNICEF's Audrey Hepburn Society.

== Personal life and final years ==
=== Multilingualism ===
Alongside her native English and Dutch, Hepburn also had some fluency in French (which she learned at school in Belgium), German, Italian, and Spanish. Throughout her life, Hepburn lived in many countries, including spending her childhood in Belgium, England, and the Netherlands, and her adult years in the United States, Italy, and Switzerland, and travelled extensively during her later years of life as part of her humanitarian work with UNICEF.

=== Marriages, relationships, and children ===
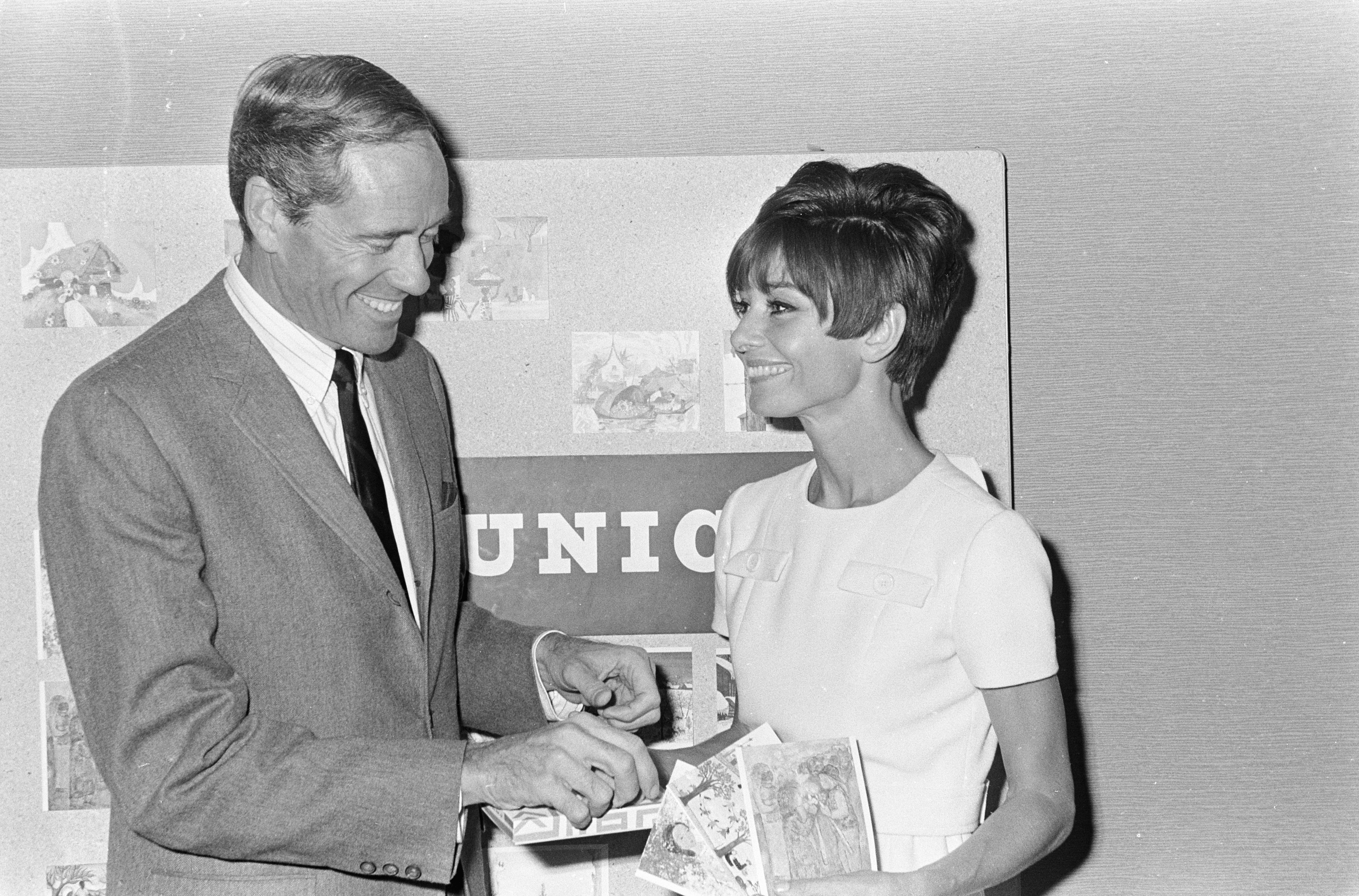
Hepburn with husband Mel Ferrer in 1966

In 1952, Hepburn became engaged to industrialist James Hanson, whom she had known since her early days in London. She called it "love at first sight", but after having her wedding dress fitted and the date set, she decided the marriage would not work because the demands of their careers would keep them apart most of the time. She issued a public statement about her decision, saying "When I get married, I want to be really married". In the early 1950s, she also dated future Hair producer Michael Butler.

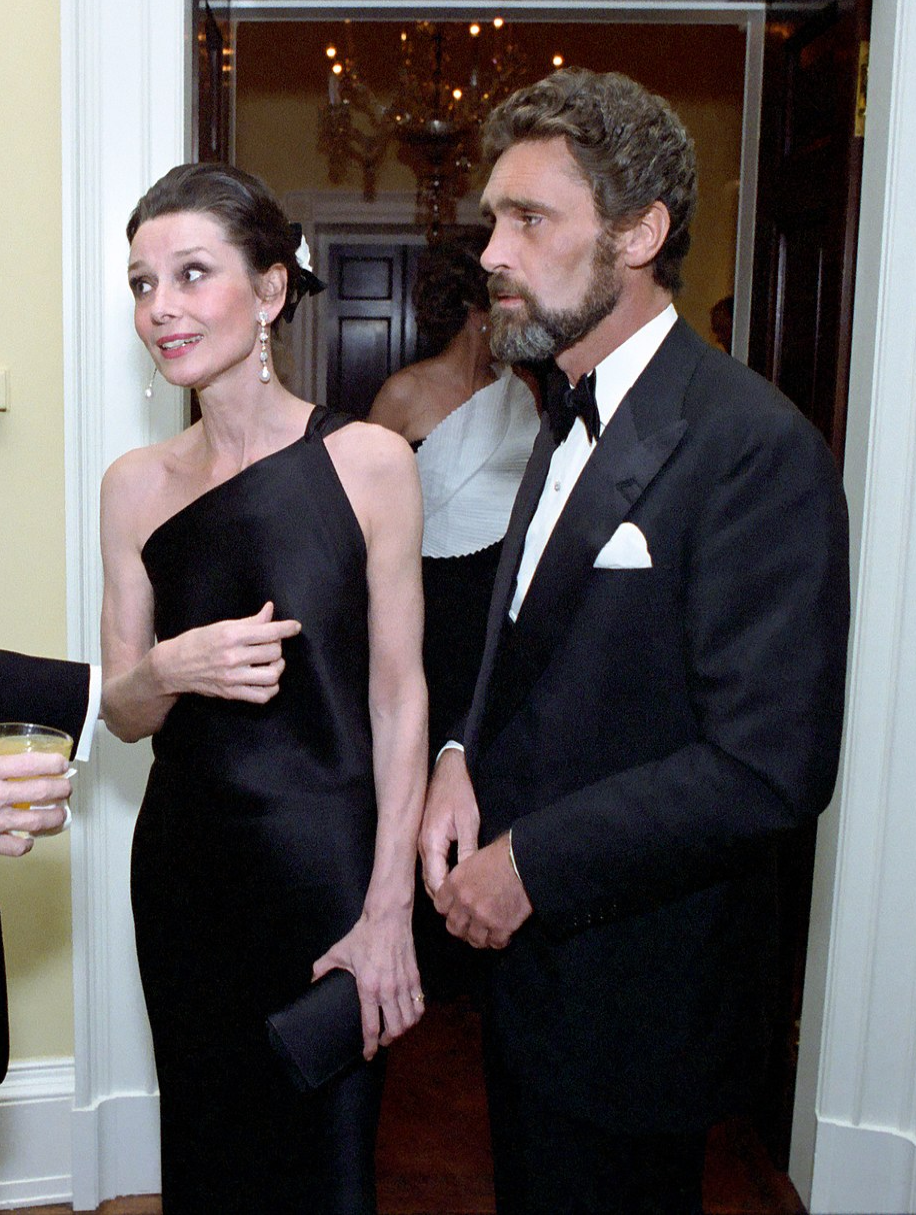
Hepburn and her partner Robert Wolders at the White House in 1981

At a cocktail party hosted by mutual friend Gregory Peck, Hepburn met American actor Mel Ferrer, and suggested that they star together in a play. The meeting led them to collaborate in Ondine, during which they began a relationship. Eight months later, on 25 September 1954, they were married in Bürgenstock, Switzerland, while preparing to star together in the film War and Peace (1956).

She and Ferrer had a son, Sean Hepburn Ferrer. Prior to Sean's birth, Hepburn had two other pregnancies that ended in miscarriages, the second one at six months. Ferrer was rumoured to be too controlling, and had been referred to by others as being her "Svengali" – an idea that Hepburn laughed off. William Holden was quoted as saying, "I think Audrey allows Mel to think he influences her." After a 14-year marriage, the couple divorced in 1968.

In 1960, Hepburn settled in Switzerland, having decided to reduce her film work and live in the country where her first son Sean was born. Looking for a house, she focused on the French-speaking part of Switzerland, the Romandie, to avoid Sean learning German in school – an echo of her traumatic wartime childhood. She bought the 21-room country estate "La Paisible" ("The Peaceful One") in the country village of Tolochenaz, Vaud. The remote estate, surrounded by high walls, suited her desire for privacy, and Hepburn was fond of cooking with the produce from its extensive vegetable gardens.

Hepburn met her second husband, Italian psychiatrist Andrea Dotti, on a Mediterranean cruise with friends in June 1968. She believed she would have more children and possibly stop working. They married on 18 January 1969, and they thereafter had a son. While pregnant with their son in 1969, Hepburn was more careful, resting for months before delivering the baby via caesarean section. Hepburn suffered a miscarriage in 1974.

Dotti and Hepburn were both unfaithful, he with younger women and she with actor Ben Gazzara during the filming of Bloodline (1979). The marriage lasted 12 years and was dissolved in 1982.

From 1980 until her death in 1993, Hepburn was in a relationship with Dutch actor Robert Wolders, the widower of actress Merle Oberon. She had met Wolders through a friend during the later years of her second marriage. In 1989, she called the nine years she had spent with him the happiest years of her life, and stated that she considered them married, just not officially.

She has five grandchildren as of 2026.

=== Illness and death ===
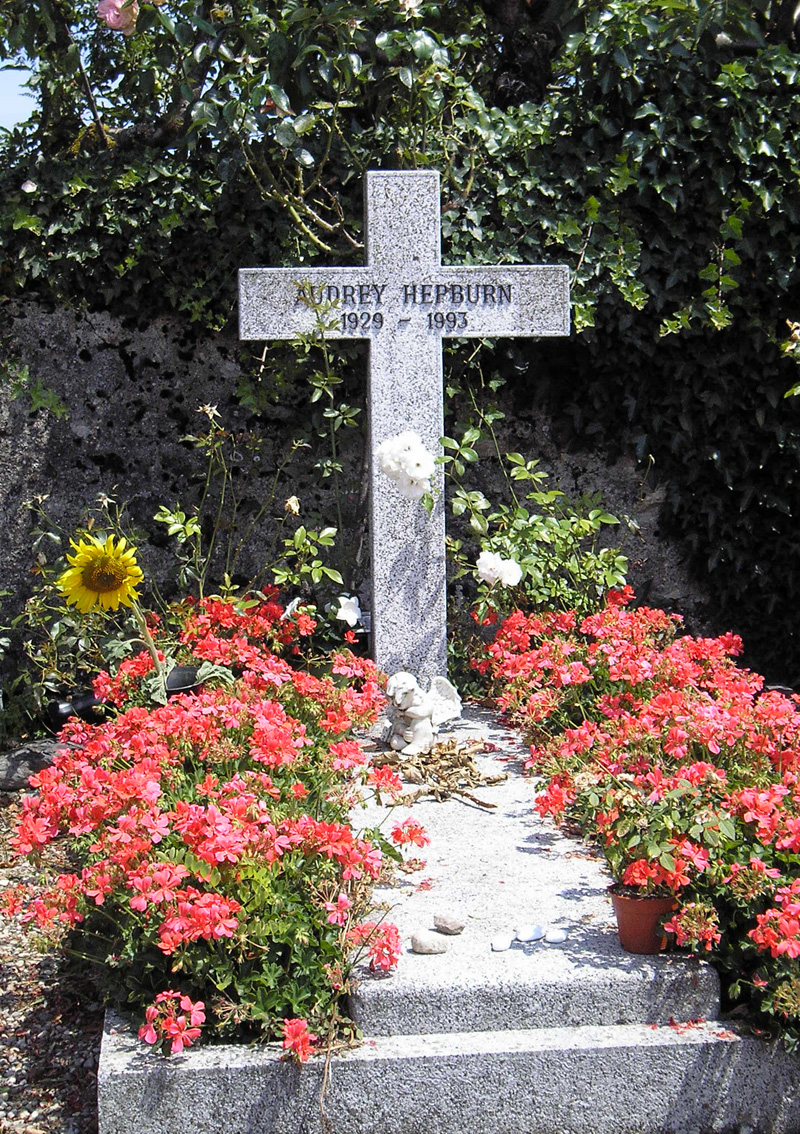
Hepburn's grave in Tolochenaz, Switzerland

Upon returning to Switzerland from Somalia in late September 1992, Hepburn developed abdominal pain. While initial medical tests in Switzerland had inconclusive results, a laparoscopy performed at the Cedars-Sinai Medical Center in Los Angeles in early November revealed a rare form of abdominal cancer belonging to a group of cancers known as pseudomyxoma peritonei. Having grown slowly over several years, the cancer had metastasised as a thin coating over her small intestine. After surgery, Hepburn began chemotherapy.

Hepburn and her family returned home to Switzerland to celebrate her last Christmas. As she was still recovering from surgery, she was unable to fly on commercial aircraft. Her long-time friend, fashion designer Hubert de Givenchy, arranged for socialite Rachel Lambert "Bunny" Mellon to send her private Gulfstream jet, filled with flowers, to take Hepburn from Los Angeles to Geneva. She spent her last days in hospice care at her home in Tolochenaz, Vaud, and was occasionally well enough to take walks in her garden, but gradually became more confined to bedrest.

On the evening of 20 January 1993, Hepburn died in her sleep at her home. She was 63. After her death, Gregory Peck recorded a tribute to Hepburn in which he tearfully recited the poem "Unending Love" by Rabindranath Tagore. Funeral services were held at the village church of Tolochenaz on 24 January 1993. Maurice Eindiguer, the same pastor who wed Hepburn and Mel Ferrer and baptised her son Sean in 1960, presided over her funeral, while Prince Sadruddin Aga Khan delivered a eulogy. Many family members and friends attended the funeral, including her sons, partner Robert Wolders, half-brother Ian Quarles van Ufford, ex-husbands Andrea Dotti and Mel Ferrer, Hubert de Givenchy, executives of UNICEF, and fellow actors Alain Delon and Roger Moore. Flower arrangements were sent to the funeral by Peck, Elizabeth Taylor, and the Dutch royal family. Later on the same day, Hepburn was interred at the Tolochenaz Cemetery.

== Legacy ==
Hepburn's legacy has endured long after her death. The American Film Institute named Hepburn third among the greatest female stars of American cinema. She is one of few entertainers who have won Academy, Emmy, Grammy, and Tony Awards. She won a record three BAFTA Awards for Best British Actress in a Leading Role. She received a tribute from the Film Society of Lincoln Center in 1991 and she was a frequent presenter at the Academy Awards. She received the BAFTA Lifetime Achievement Award in 1992. She was the recipient of numerous posthumous awards, including the 1993 Jean Hersholt Humanitarian Award and competitive Grammy and Emmy Awards. In January 2009, Hepburn was named on The Times' list of the top 10 British actresses of all time. In 2010, Emma Thompson opined that Hepburn "can't sing and she can't really act"; some people agreed, others disagreed. Hepburn's son Sean later said "My mother would be the first person to say that she wasn't the best actress in the world. But she was a movie star."

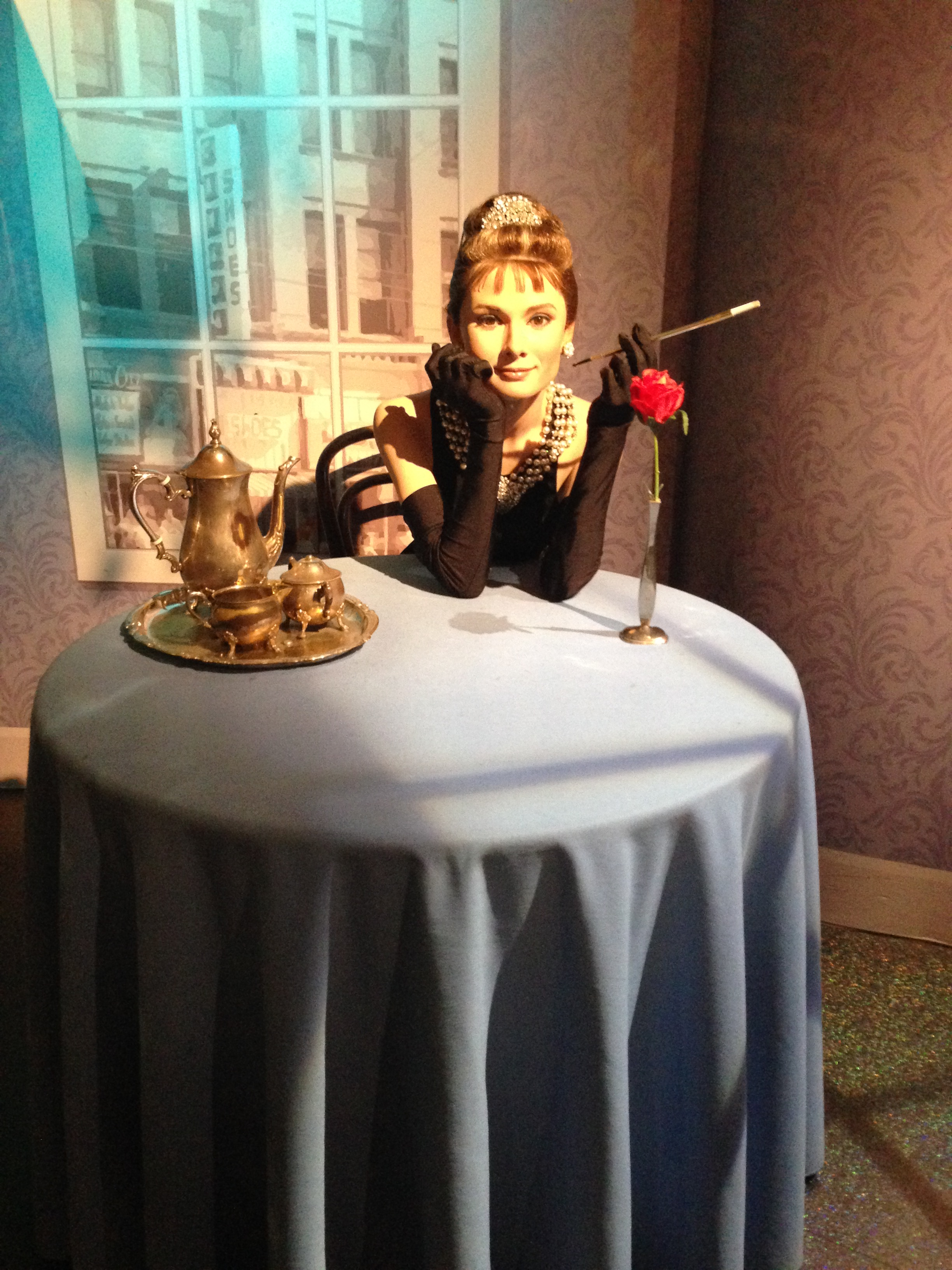
Waxwork of Hepburn at Madame Tussauds, London

She has been the subject of many biographies since her death, including the 2000 dramatisation of her life titled The Audrey Hepburn Story which starred Jennifer Love Hewitt and Emmy Rossum as the older and younger Hepburn respectively. Her son and granddaughter, Sean and Emma Ferrer, helped produce a biographical documentary directed by Helena Coan, entitled Audrey (2020). The film was released to positive reception.

In 2012, Hepburn was among the British cultural icons selected by artist Sir Peter Blake to appear in a new version of his best known artwork – the Beatles' Sgt. Pepper's Lonely Hearts Club Band album cover – to celebrate the British cultural figures of his lifetime thus far that he most admired. On 4 May 2014, Google featured a doodle on its homepage on what would have been Hepburn's 85th birthday.

Sean Ferrer founded the Audrey Hepburn Children's Fund in memory of his mother shortly after her death. The US Fund for UNICEF also founded the Audrey Hepburn Society: the Society hosted annual charity balls for fundraising, until Ferrer became involved in lawsuits in the late 2010s on behalf of his mother's estate. Dotti also became patron of the Pseudomyxoma Survivor charity, dedicated to providing support to patients of the rare cancer that was fatal to Hepburn, pseudomyxoma peritonei, and Sean Ferrer became the rare disease ambassador since 2014 and for 2015 on behalf of European Organisation for Rare Diseases. A year after his mother's death in 1993, Ferrer founded the Audrey Hepburn Children's Fund (originally named Hollywood for Children Inc.), a charity funded by exhibitions of Audrey Hepburn memorabilia. He directed the charity in cooperation with his half-brother Luca Dotti, and Robert Wolders, his mother's partner, which aimed to continue the humanitarian work of Audrey Hepburn. Ferrer brought the exhibition "Timeless Audrey" on a world tour to raise money for the foundation. He served as Chairman of the Fund before resigning in 2012, turning over the position to Dotti. In 2017, Ferrer was sued by the Fund for alleged self-serving conduct. In October 2017, Ferrer responded by suing the Fund for trademark infringement, claiming that the Fund no longer had the right to use Hepburn's name or likeness. Ferrer's suit against the Fund was dismissed in March 2018 due to the complaint's failure to include Dotti as a defendant. In 2019, the court sided with Ferrer, with the judge ruling there was no merit to the charity's claims it had the independent right to use Audrey Hepburn's name and likeness, or to enter into contracts with third parties without Ferrer's consent.

Hepburn's image is widely used in advertising campaigns across the world. In Japan, a series of commercials used colourised and digitally enhanced clips of Hepburn in Roman Holiday to advertise Kirin black tea. In the United States, Hepburn was featured in a 2006 Gap commercial that used clips of her dancing from Funny Face, set to AC/DC's "Back in Black", with the tagline "It's Back – The Skinny Black Pant". To celebrate its "Keep it Simple" campaign, the Gap made a sizeable donation to the Audrey Hepburn Children's Fund. In 2013, a computer-manipulated representation of Hepburn was used in a television advert for the British chocolate bar Galaxy. In 2025, she was the subject of "Audrey Hepburn", a song by singer-songwriter Maisie Peters.

=== Public image and style icon ===
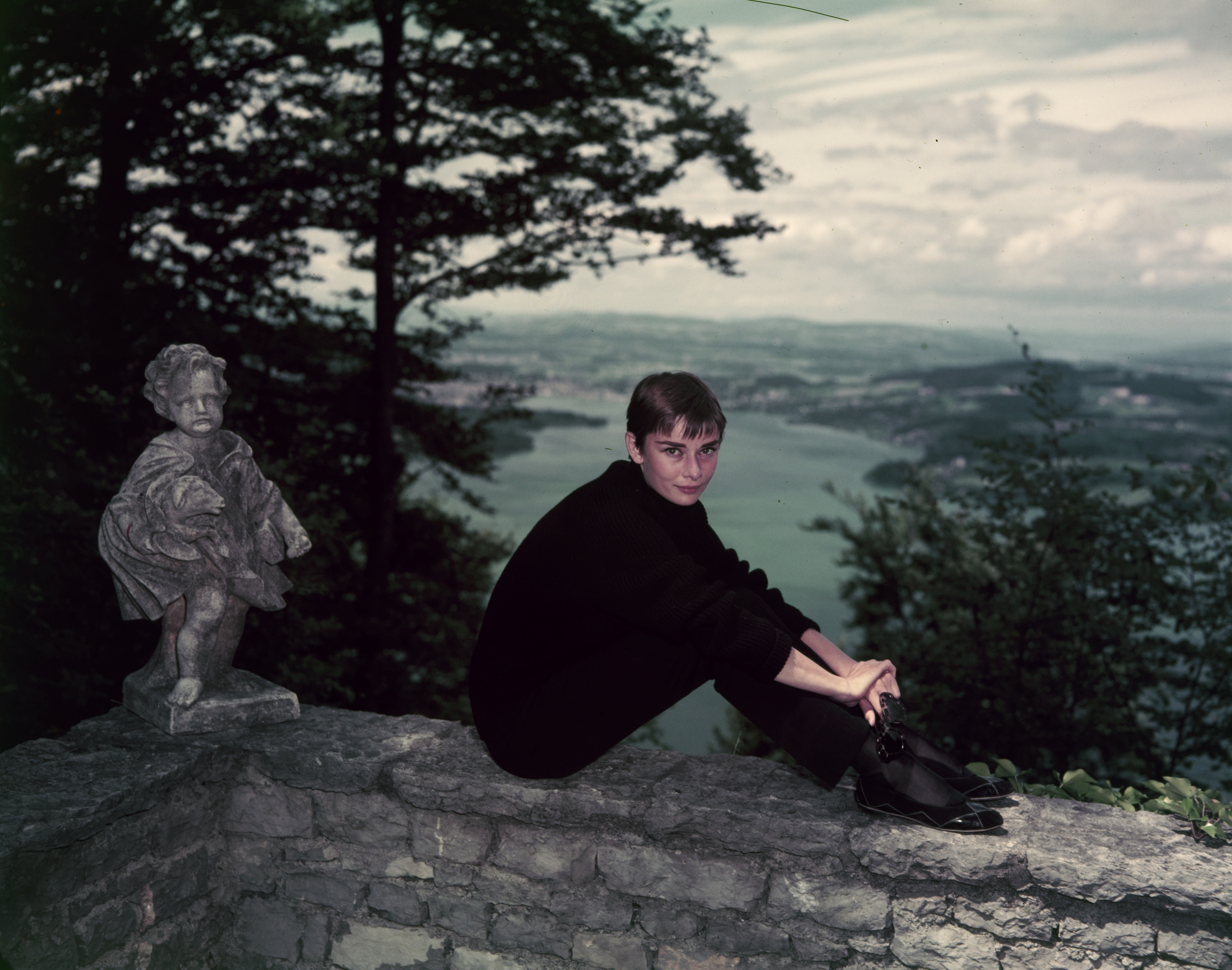
Hepburn with a short hairstyle and wearing one of her signature looks: black turtleneck, slim black trousers, and ballet flats

Hepburn was known for her fashion choices and distinctive look, to the extent that journalist Mark Tungate has described her as a recognisable brand. When she first rose to stardom in Roman Holiday (1953), she was seen as an alternative feminine ideal that appealed more to women than men, compared to the more sexual and curvy Marilyn Monroe and Elizabeth Taylor. With her short hairstyle, thick eyebrows, slim body, and "gamine" looks, she presented a look that young women found easier to emulate than those of more sexual film stars. In 1954, fashion photographer Cecil Beaton declared Hepburn the "public embodiment of our new feminine ideal" in Vogue, and wrote that "Nobody ever looked like her before World War II ... Yet we recognise the rightness of this appearance in relation to our historical needs. The proof is that thousands of imitations have appeared." The magazine and its British version frequently reported on her style throughout the following decade. Alongside model Twiggy, Hepburn has been cited as one of the key public figures who made being very slim fashionable. Vogue has referred to her as "the acme of classic beauty".

Added to the International Best Dressed List in 1961, Hepburn was associated with a minimalistic style, usually wearing clothes with simple silhouettes that emphasised her slim body, such as monochromatic colours with occasional statement accessories. In the late 1950s, Hepburn popularised plain black leggings. She was in particular associated with French fashion designer Hubert de Givenchy, who was first hired to design her on-screen wardrobe for her second Hollywood film, Sabrina (1954), when she was still unknown as a film actor and he a young couturier just starting his fashion house. Although initially disappointed that "Miss Hepburn" was not Katharine Hepburn as he had mistakenly thought, Givenchy and Hepburn formed a life-long friendship.

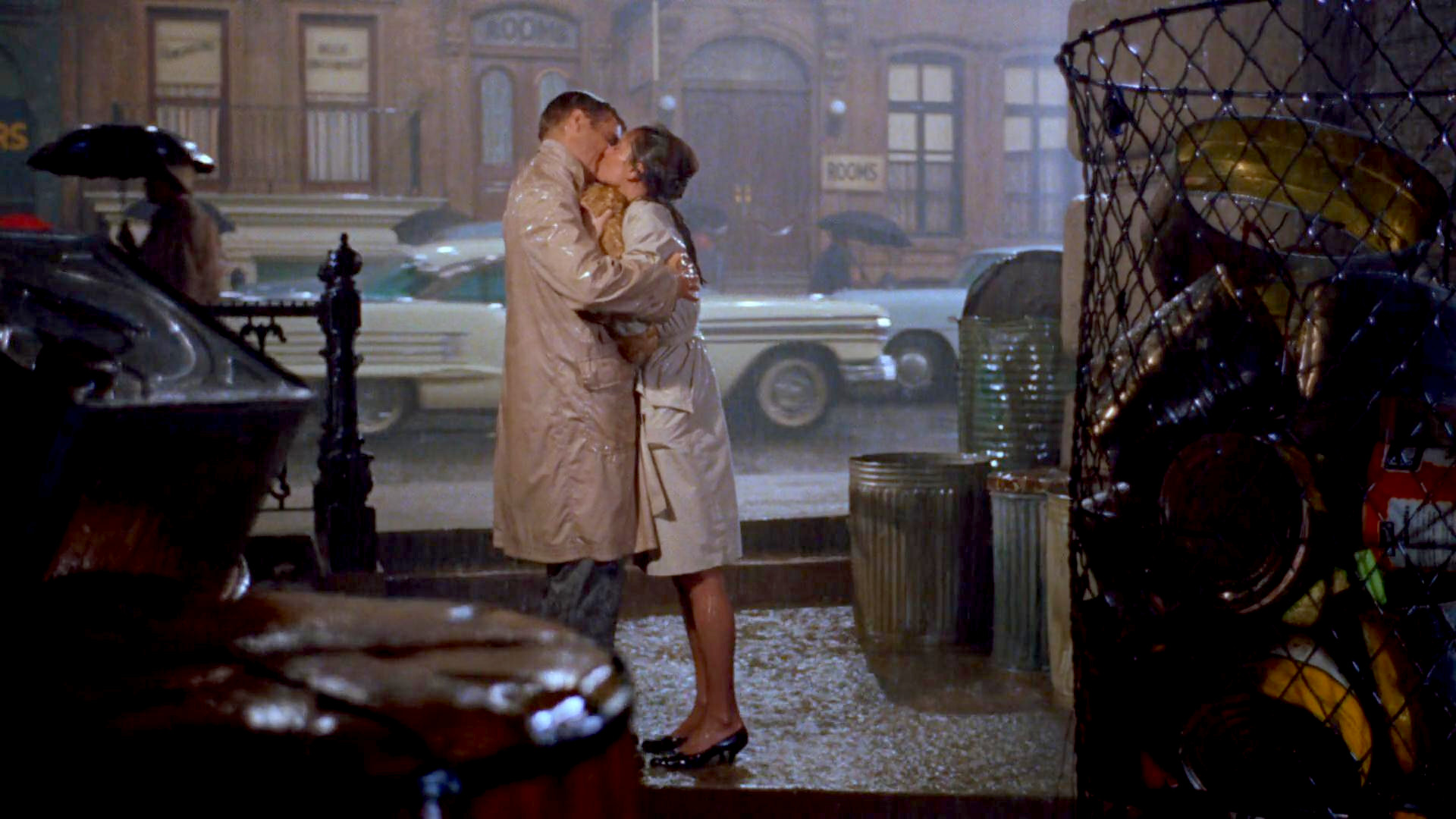
With George Peppard in Breakfast at Tiffany's (1961)

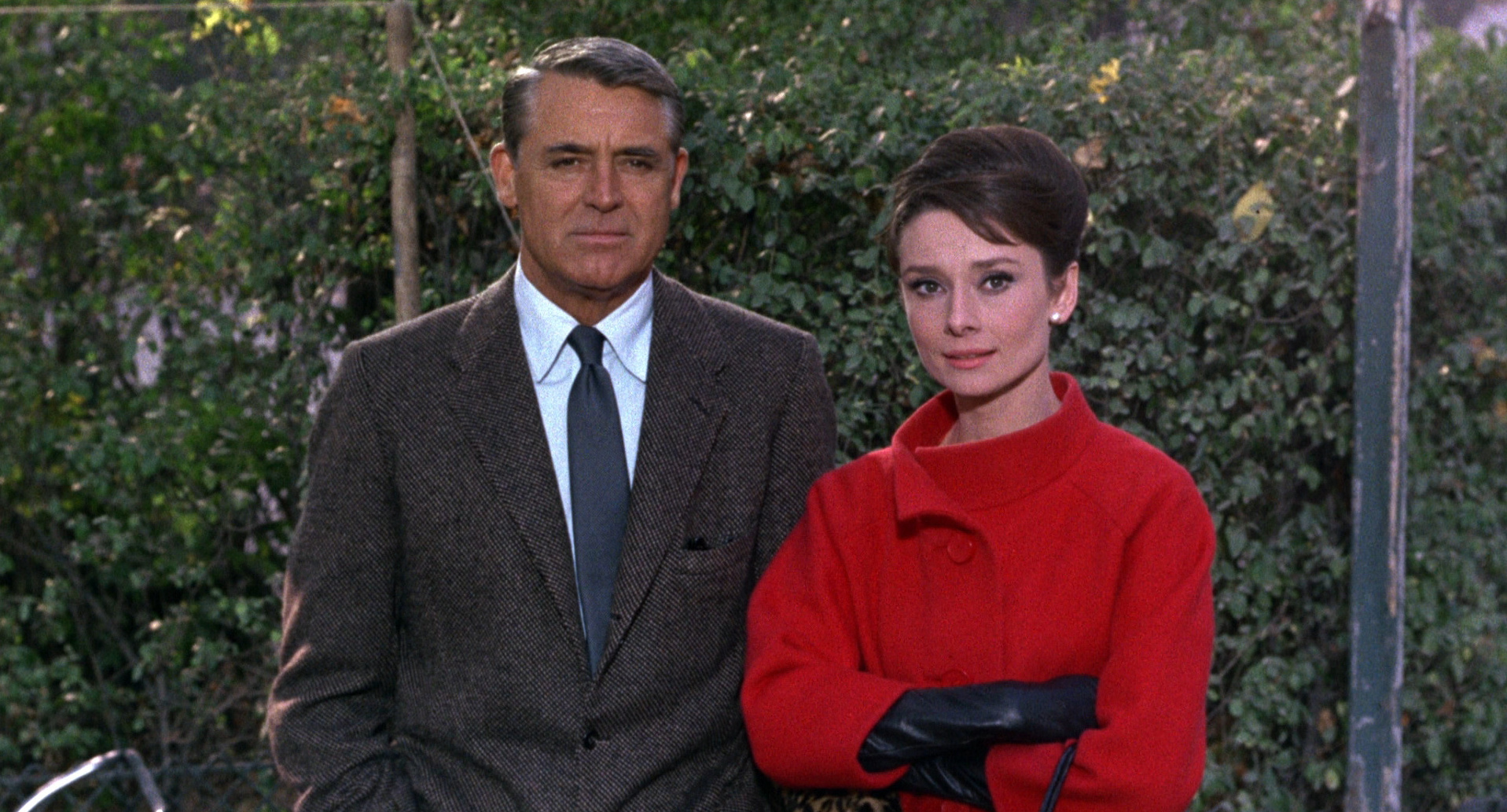
With Cary Grant in Charade (1963)

In addition to Sabrina, Givenchy designed her costumes for Love in the Afternoon (1957), Breakfast at Tiffany's (1961), Funny Face (1957), Charade (1963), Paris When It Sizzles (1964), and How to Steal a Million (1966), as well as clothing her off screen. According to Moseley, fashion plays an unusually central role in many of Hepburn's films, stating that "the costume is not tied to the character, functioning 'silently' in the mise-en-scène, but as 'fashion' becomes an attraction in the aesthetic in its own right". She also became the face of Givenchy's first perfume, L'Interdit, in 1957. In addition to her partnership with Givenchy, Hepburn was credited with boosting the sales of Burberry trench coats when she wore one in Breakfast at Tiffany's, and was associated with Italian footwear brand Tod's.

In her private life, Hepburn preferred to wear casual and comfortable clothes, contrary to the haute couture she wore on screen and at public events. Despite being admired for her beauty, she never considered herself attractive, stating in a 1959 interview that "you can even say that I hated myself at certain periods. I was too fat, or maybe too tall, or maybe just plain too ugly ... you can say my definiteness stems from underlying feelings of insecurity and inferiority. I couldn't conquer these feelings by acting indecisive. I found the only way to get the better of them was by adopting a forceful, concentrated drive." In 1989, she stated that "my look is attainable ... Women can look like Audrey Hepburn by flipping out their hair, buying the large glasses and the little sleeveless dresses."

Hepburn's influence as a style icon still continued several decades after the height of her acting career in the 1950s and 1960s. Moseley notes that especially after her death in 1993, she became increasingly admired, with magazines frequently advising readers on how to get her look, and fashion designers using her as inspiration. Throughout her career and after her death, Hepburn received numerous accolades for her stylish appearance and attractiveness. For example, she was named the "most beautiful woman of all time" and "most beautiful woman of the 20th century" in polls by Evian and QVC respectively, and in 2015, was voted "the most stylish Brit of all time" in a poll commissioned by Samsung. Her film costumes fetch large sums of money in auctions: one of the "little black dresses" designed by Givenchy for Breakfast at Tiffany's was sold by Christie's for a record sum of £467,200 in 2006. (Note: This was the highest price paid for a dress from a film, until it was surpassed by the $4.6 million paid in June 2011 for Marilyn Monroe's "subway dress" from The Seven Year Itch. Of the two dresses that Hepburn wore on screen, one is held in the Givenchy archives while the other is displayed in the Museum of Costume in Madrid. A subsequent London auction of Hepburn's film wardrobe in December 2009 raised £270,200, including £60,000 for the black Chantilly lace cocktail gown from How to Steal a Million.)

In 1999, HarperCollins published Audrey's Style by Pamela Keogh, a 340-page tome devoted to Hepburn's personality, beliefs and style. The book included interviews with some of the people who knew her best, and also included many photographs of her, some of which had been rarely seen before.

== Filmography and stage roles ==
Hepburn was considered by some to be one of the most beautiful women of all time. Remembered as a film and style icon, she was ranked as the third greatest screen legend in American cinema by the American Film Institute. Her debut was as a flight stewardess in the 1948 Dutch film Dutch in Seven Lessons. Hepburn then performed on the British stage as a chorus girl in the musicals High Button Shoes (1948), and Sauce Tartare (1949). Two years later she made her Broadway debut as the title character in the play Gigi. Hepburn's Hollywood debut as a runaway princess in William Wyler's Roman Holiday (1953) opposite Gregory Peck made her a star. For her performance she received the Academy Award for Best Actress, the BAFTA Award for Best British Actress, and the Golden Globe Award for Best Actress in a Motion Picture – Drama. In 1954 she played a chauffeur's daughter caught in a love triangle in Billy Wilder's romantic comedy Sabrina opposite Humphrey Bogart and William Holden. In the same year Hepburn garnered the Tony Award for Best Actress in a Play for portraying the titular water nymph in the play Ondine.

== Awards and honours ==
Hepburn received numerous awards and honours during her career. Hepburn won, or was nominated for, awards for her work in motion pictures, television, spoken-word recording, on stage, and humanitarian work. She was five-times nominated for an Academy Award, and she was awarded the 1953 Academy Award for Best Actress for her performance in Roman Holiday and the Jean Hersholt Humanitarian Award in 1993, posthumously, for her humanitarian work. From five nominations, she won a record three BAFTA Awards for Best British Actress in a Leading Role, and received a BAFTA Special Award in 1992.

== See also ==
- Sophia (robot) – A humanoid robot modelled after Audrey Hepburn
- White floral Givenchy dress of Audrey Hepburn (Academy Awards, 1954)
- Black Givenchy dress of Audrey Hepburn (Breakfast at Tiffany's, 1961)
- List of most valuable celebrity memorabilia
- List of Academy Award winners and nominees from Great Britain
- List of actors with Academy Award nominations
- List of actors with more than one Academy Award nomination in the acting categories
- List of oldest and youngest Academy Award winners and nominees § Youngest winners 3
- List of EGOT winners
