= Love Among Thieves =

1987 television film directed by Roger Young

- Print advertisement
- Genre: Crime; Romance; Thriller
- Written by: Stephen Black; Henry Stern
- Directed by: Roger Young
- Starring: Audrey Hepburn; Robert Wagner; Patrick Bauchau; Jerry Orbach; Brion James; Samantha Eggar
- Music by: Arthur B. Rubinstein
- Country of origin: United States
- Original language: English

Production
- Executive producer: Karen Mack
- Producer: Robert A. Papazian
- Cinematography: Gayne Rescher
- Editor: James Mitchell
- Running time: 100 minutes
- Production companies: Lorimar Productions; Robert Papazian Productions

Original release
- Network: ABC
- Release: February 23, 1987

Love Among Thieves is a 1987 American romantic thriller television film directed by Roger Young, starring Audrey Hepburn, Robert Wagner, Patrick Bauchau, Jerry Orbach, Brion James, and Samantha Eggar. It premiered on ABC on February 23, 1987. The ending left the door open for either a sequel or possibly a television series, but neither eventuated. Reportedly, Hepburn donated her salary to UNICEF. Love Among Thieves is notable for several reasons. It was the only made-for-television film in which Hepburn appeared (although she had done some live drama productions in the 1950s). It was also the last film in which she took a starring role (her next, and final, film performance in 1989's Always was a cameo).

This was the first Hepburn film since 1981's They All Laughed. It contains a number of intentional references to Hepburn's earlier films, mostly in dialogue, although the basic plot borrows from her 1960s films Charade, Paris, When It Sizzles ‘Wait Until Dark’ and How to Steal a Million. The film includes her final on-screen kiss (with Wagner).

== Plot ==
Baroness and concert pianist, Caroline DuLac, steals three jewel-encrusted Fabergé eggs from a San Francisco museum. The eggs are demanded as ransom for her kidnapped fiancé in Latin America. She boards a plane for the Latin American city of Ladera, as per instructions, and is met by a drifter named Mike Chambers.

Caroline first believes that Mike is one of the kidnappers, until a mysterious man in a trench coat tries to kill her and Mike comes to the rescue. They are both captured by a band of Mexican bandits, who also may or may not be part of the scheme. Meanwhile, the couple are pursued by Spicer, a hired thug assigned to retrieve the loot.

== Cast ==
- Audrey Hepburn as Baroness Caroline DuLac
- Robert Wagner as Mike Chambers
- Patrick Bauchau as Alan Channing
- Jerry Orbach as Spicer
- Brion James as Andre
- Samantha Eggar as Solange

== Home media ==
On October 6, 2009, the film became available on DVD through the Warner Archive Collection.

== See also ==
- List of American films of 1987
