= Audrey Hepburn's Enchanted Tales =

Studio album by Audrey Hepburn
- Released: 1992
- Genre: Children's music
- Length: Approximately 1 hour
- Label: Dove Kids

Audrey Hepburn's Enchanted Tales is a 1992 album featuring classic children's stories read by actress Audrey Hepburn. The stories are adaptations by Mary Sheldon of the stories "Sleeping Beauty," "Tom Thumb," "Beauty and the Beast," and "Laidronette, Empress of the Pagodes." Interspersed with these tales are fictional interludes of an elderly French woman reminiscing about Maurice Ravel visiting her childhood home and telling stories.

The music on the album was conducted by Lalo Schifrin with excerpts from Ravel's Mother Goose Suite. Proceeds from the album were donated to the ASPCA.

== Tracklisting ==
- A1: Sleeping Beauty
- A2: Tom Thumb
- B1: Beauty & The Beast
- B2: Laidronette, Empress Of The Pagodes

== Reception ==
Publishers Weekly praised the album as "a perfect introduction to classical music", and a Los Angeles Times reviewer called it "pure magic," praising in particular Hepburn's "unique, captivating charm." Hepburn was posthumously awarded a Grammy Award for Best Spoken Word Album for Children in 1994.
