= Unending love (poem) =

Poem by Rabindranath Tagore

Unending love is a poem by Rabindranath Tagore, originally written in Bengali and titled Ananta Prem. It expresses similar thoughts about eternal love to poet Kālidāsa's Shakuntala, and works by Shelley and Keats.
