= Dutch in Seven Lessons =

- Hepburn in the film
- Directed by: Charles Huguenot van der Linden; Heinz Josephson
- Written by: Charles Huguenot van der Linden; Heinz Josephson
- Release date: 1948
- Running time: 79 minutes
- Country: Netherlands
- Languages: Dutch; English

Dutch in Seven Lessons (Nederlands in zeven lessen) is a 1948 film produced in the Netherlands. Audrey Hepburn made her film debut playing a KLM flight attendant in a small role. It was originally shot as part of an English documentary series on aspects of the Netherlands but later expanded to feature film length for an unsuccessful domestic release. Their running times were 39 and 79 minutes respectively.
