= Paris When It Sizzles =

1964 film by Richard Quine

- Theatrical release poster
- Directed by: Richard Quine
- Screenplay by: George Axelrod
- Based on: Holiday for Henrietta by: Julien Duvivier; Henri Jeanson
- Produced by: George Axelrod; Richard Quine
- Starring: William Holden; Audrey Hepburn
- Cinematography: Charles Lang; Claude Renoir
- Edited by: Archie Marshek
- Music by: Nelson Riddle
- Production companies: Richard Quine Productions; Charleston Productions
- Distributed by: Paramount Pictures
- Release date: April 8, 1964 (United States)
- Running time: 108/110 minutes
- Country: United States
- Languages: English; French
- Budget: $4 million (est.)

Paris When It Sizzles is a 1964 American romantic comedy film directed by Richard Quine from a screenplay by George Axelrod, based on the 1952 French film Holiday for Henrietta by Julien Duvivier and Henri Jeanson. The film stars William Holden and Audrey Hepburn, with Grégoire Aslan, Raymond Bussières, Noël Coward, and Tony Curtis.

The film's title derives from the Cole Porter song "I Love Paris":

I love Paris in the springtime
I love Paris in the fall
I love Paris in the winter when it drizzles
I love Paris in the summer when it sizzles

== Plot ==
Alexander Meyerheim hires veteran playboy screenwriter Richard Benson to write a screenplay. Overly immersed in his playboy lifestyle, Benson procrastinates writing the script until two days before the due date. Gabrielle Simpson, a temp secretary Benson hired to type the script, arrives at Richard's hotel room, only to discover that little has been written. Richard tells her that Alexander will be in Paris by Sunday morning, in two days' time, and that they have that long to write a 138-page script.

Richard and Gabrielle then begin to weave a script together, and Richard is awakened and inspired by the beautiful Gabrielle. They imagine various scenarios for his screenplay, The Girl Who Stole the Eiffel Tower, which is based on their unfolding romance as Gabrielle goes back and forth between thinking Richard is a good man and her budding attraction to him, and her hesitancy when considering he described himself as a "liar and a thief" for taking Meyerheim's money and not delivering the script earlier. The screenplay, with small but inspired and comedic roles for Noël Coward, Tony Curtis, and other famous stars of the era, spoofs the movie industry, actors, studio heads, and itself, and is rife with allusions to the earlier film roles of Hepburn and Holden.

After killing off his character tragically at the end of the script, Richard confesses to Gabrielle that he is just an old washed-up alcoholic and does not deserve love or a happy ending. Calling the script they've just finished lousy, he admits that his creative peak is well behind him and he no longer cares about his work. Committed to continue scamming people and galavanting through life, he sends her away for her sake and drunkenly falls asleep.

Eventually, Richard comes to his senses. He seeks out Gabrielle to tell her he loves her and that they have a new script to write. Richard and Gabrielle run off with each other; Richard drops the pages of the old script into some sparking fireworks which are going off for Bastille Day. The two lovers kiss, as the words "kiss" and "fade out" appear on the screen.

== Cast ==
Some members of the cast have roles in The Girl Who Stole the Eiffel Tower, the film-within-the-film.

Actor	Role	Role in the film-within-the-film
Audrey Hepburn	Gabrielle Simpson	Gaby
William Holden	Richard Benson	Rick
Grégoire Aslan		Police Inspector Gilet
Raymond Bussières		François, the gangster
Tony Curtis		Gaby's narcissistic boyfriend; Maurice, the second policeman
Noël Coward	Alexander Meyerheim	The Producer

Cast notes

- In addition to the uncredited role played by Tony Curtis, first dressed in a red sweater, white pants and riding a Vespa, later in a dark green suit and a light green shirt and tie, the film also features uncredited cameo appearances by Marlene Dietrich as herself, dressed in white, stepping out of a white Bentley, and Mel Ferrer, Hepburn's real-life husband at the time, who plays a party guest dressed as Dr. Jekyll. Frank Sinatra sings a few bars of the opening song, The Girl Who Stole the Eiffel Tower.

== Production ==
The film, whose working title was Together in Paris, is a remake of the 1952 French film Holiday for Henrietta, directed by Julien Duvivier.

It was written by George Axelrod who called director Richard Quine "sweet and highly talented, but totally insane, which made him exactly my kind of person. He and I produced a totally insane picture called Paris When It Sizzles."

Paramount exercised an option on their contracts with both Hepburn and Holden, forcing them to make the film together. Holden, having had an affair with Hepburn during the making of Sabrina a decade earlier and been in love with her ever since, attempted without success to rekindle a romance with the now-married actress. Holden's alcoholism was also a constant challenge for Quine, who moved into a rented house next to Holden's during production to keep an eye on him. Holden later commented on both of the problems:

I remember the day I arrived at Orly Airport for Paris When It Sizzles. I could hear my footsteps echoing against the walls of the transit corridor, just like a condemned man walking the last mile. I realized that I had to face Audrey and I had to deal with my drinking. And I didn’t think I could handle either situation.

Curtis was brought into the production to film during a week when Holden was undergoing treatment for his alcoholism at the prompting of the director. Noël Coward worked on the film for three days, and a cameo from Marlene Dietrich meant to duplicate the many cameos of Around the World in 80 Days (1956).

The film was shot at the Billancourt Studios and on location around Paris. The film's sets were designed by the art director Jean d'Eaubonne. Audrey Hepburn's choice for cinematographer was Franz Planer who had photographed her in several of her films. With Planer being ill, Hepburn agreed to the use of Claude Renoir, however Charles Lang replaced Renoir as the director of photography during production, a change demanded by Hepburn after she saw what she felt were unflattering dailies.

Hepburn shot the film in the summer of 1962, back-to-back with Charade, which she shot that fall. The films shared several locations, most notably a Punch and Judy puppet theatre in the park in front of the Théâtre Marigny.

Though shooting finished in October 1962, a screening at Paramount led the studio to deem the film unreleasable with the exception of the attraction of its two stars.

In the film, the characters make passing mention of other films, and film topics, including "Frankenstein" and two contemporary films in which Hepburn played the lead: My Fair Lady and Breakfast at Tiffany's.

== Reception ==
Variety called Paris When It Sizzles "marshmallow-weight hokum", and quoted a line from the film as an apt description of the film itself: "contrived, utterly preposterous, and totally unmotivated"; it complimented the two leads, saying Hepburn is a "refreshingly individual creature in an era of the exaggerated curve", and Holden "handles his assignment commendably".

Time magazine said the film was "a multimillion dollar improvisation that does everything but what the title promises" and suggested that "writer George Axelrod (The Seven Year Itch) and director Richard Quine should have taken a hint from Holden's character Richard Benson, who writes his movie, takes a long sober look at what he has wrought, and burns it."

Turner Classic Movies notes that "critics uniformly panned" the film, but said it "has earned a reputation as a guilty pleasure for those who enjoy in-joke movie spoofs and an absurdist storyline played out against the glorious backdrop of the City of Light".

== Paperback novelization ==
In February 1964, Dell Publishing issued a paperback novelization (with a cover price of 40¢) by then-veteran tie-in author Saul Cooper. There may have been some editorial confusion in coordinating the copyediting and design stages of the book's production, however, because the byline on the cover is "Michael Milner" (Cooper's occasional pseudonym), while on the title page, the byline is that of fictional screenwriter "Richard Benson", the story's male lead. The Benson attribution is amusingly fitting, as Cooper's novelistic approach was to narrate the story in the first person, using Benson's voice and perspective. But that's what makes it seem to be a publishing glitch that the cover byline should be yet another pseudonym, rather than a follow-through with the literary conceit.

== See also ==
- List of American films of 1964
- List of films featuring fictional films
