= Gardens of the World with Audrey Hepburn =

1990s documentary television series

Gardens of the World with Audrey Hepburn was a 1993 documentary television series filmed on location in some of the world's most beautiful, noteworthy gardens, hosted by Audrey Hepburn, who also co-narrates the series with Michael York.

Audrey Hepburn, who loved nature and gardens, saw a rare opportunity to bring forth their beauty in poetic and meaningful ways in Gardens of the World. Her unique vision of the series included fusing the historical and aesthetic aspects with the arts of literature, music and painting. She was awarded her Primetime Emmy for Outstanding Individual Achievement, Informational Programming, posthumously in the fall of 1993. It was Hepburn's first and only television series, and her final appearance on screen; she died on January 20, 1993, four days before the series debuted on PBS in the United States.

Audrey Hepburn in between takes during filming for Gardens of the World -- breathing in the beauty of her mise-en-scène in Monet's gardens in Giverny, June 11, 1990. Insert photo: Director of Photography Jeri Sopanen and crew.

Audrey Hepburn's principal photography was filmed in the spring and summer of 1990 in illustrious public and private gardens in England, France, Italy, Japan, Netherlands, Dominican Republic, & U.S.A. Her life partner Robert Wolders was with Hepburn throughout the production: "It became an intensely personal and creative process for her. She immersed herself in not only the beauty of the gardens, but also in their origins and evolution." Also that summer Hepburn wrote her foreword to the series' companion book from her home in Tolochenaz, Switzerland.

In January 1991, Hepburn recorded her voice over narration at LaserPacific in Hollywood; the same month “Audrey Hepburn's Grand Garden Tour for PBS” was the cover story of House & Garden. Writer Katherine Whiteside noted, "Hepburn emphasizes the timeliness of Gardens of the World and its relevance to her work with UNICEF. 'Everyone's concerned with the environment, but of course environment includes flowers and trees as well as children. One cannot survive without the others. Today more than ever, gardens remind us of the beauty we are in danger of losing.'"

In New York on March 6, 1991, Cartier honored Hepburn and Gardens of the World with a High Tea reception at their Fifth Avenue Mansion; the following day, Ralph Lauren hosted the occasion of her book signing at his flagship store on 72nd Street and Madison Avenue. About which Dominick Dunne wrote, “the crowds were so great that the line extended from Madison all the way to Park Avenue.” These occasions preceded PBS’ March premiere of a one-hour Gardens of the World introductory special.

The PBS premiere of the six-part series commenced in 1993, on January 24th. However, KCET Los Angeles premiered the first episode of the series, Roses & Rose Gardens, three days earlier on January 21st. Heartwrendingly, the same day the Los Angeles times published Hepburn's obituary and their review of Roses. “It is hard to imagine any more compelling [title] than the half-hour spent wandering through some of the world's most enchanting rose gardens with one of the world's most enchanting women.”

Two further episodes premiered in January 1996, along with a re-release of the six-part series on Home & Garden Television. The series was shown internationally by top broadcasters in more than 30 countries. A DVD of all 8 programs was released in 1999; in September 2006, an extended DVD Tribute Edition was released.

== Episode list ==
Each episode presents a different garden theme as well as broader concepts of aesthetic, botanical, cultural or environmental significance.

- 1. "Roses and Rose Gardens" explores the heritage, beauty, and romance of the garden rose: from the French ideal of a rose garden at La Roseraie de L'Haÿ-les-Roses, south of Paris to the unsurpassed collection of old roses at Mottisfont Abbey in Hampshire, England. Guest Appearance: Rosarian Sir Graham Stuart Thomas.
- 2. "Formal Gardens" sets forth the evolution of formal garden design through centuries: from Renaissance gardens of Italy (Villa Gamberaia, Villa Lante), the grand 17th century gardens of France (Chateau de Courances, Versailles) through to the fusion of the formal and natural styles in 20th century gardens of England (Hidcote Manor, Tintinhull House). UNESCO World Heritage Sites Featured: Hadrian's Villa in Rome, The Alhambra in Granada, and Versailles. Guest Appearance: British author and garden designer Penelope Hobhouse.
- 3. "Tulips and Spring Bulbs" tells the story of the tulip's influence through centuries in the history and art of Holland. Presents fine, rare tulip specimens, Fritillaria, hyacinths, Muscari and Narcissus – planted en masse, in mixed plantings, and naturalistically in meadows and woodlands. Gardens included in Holland: Het Loo Palace, Hortus Botanicus Leiden, Hortus Bulborum, and Keukenhof; and in England, Chenies Manor and Garsington Manor.
- 4." Flower Gardens" features exemplary interpretations of the more naturalistic, mixed planting style that first emerged in the early 20th century, including Claude Monet's profuse, impressionistic paths of color in his gardens at Giverny and the classic perennial flower borders at Tintinhull House in Somerset, England. Guest appearance, Penelope Hobhouse. (Part 2).
- 5. "Country Gardens" surveys the range of character and use of the country garden: from Giardino di Ninfa south of Rome, to cottage gardens in Hidcote Bartrim Village in the Cotswold, and the farmhouse gardens of Chilcombe House in Dorset County, England. Guest appearances: American artist and designer, Ryan Gainey; British author and garden designer John Brookes.
- 6. "Public Gardens and Trees" posits a humanist view of public gardens and environs, their early conceptions and adaptions: from George Washington's gardens at Historic Mount Vernon, to Jardin des Plantes, Jardin du Luxembourg, the Bois de Boulogne, and the continuing story of the "greening of Paris." Audrey Hepburn concludes the episode with her tribute to trees and nature, reading from the diary of Anne Frank.
- 7. "Japanese Gardens" evidences Japan's timeless cultural reverence for the natural world in the gardens of Kyoto: from the ancient moss temple garden of Saiho-ji and Karesansui-style gardens at Ryoan-Ji, Daisen-In and Ryogen-En, to the borrowed landscapes of Shinyodo, the extensive pond gardens of the Heian Shrine and the formal stroll garden at Shinshin-An.
- 8. "Tropical Gardens" traverses the lure of the tropics, its diversity of plant species, brilliance of colors, leaf shapes and forms: as illustrated two centuries apart in the paintings and writings of "exploratrices intrépides" Marianne North and Margaret Mee; from within the lush, personal paradise at Villa Pancha in the Dominican Republic, one of Asia's oldest botanic gardens, Keban Raya in Indonesia and Hawaii's youngest, Ho`omaluhia on Oahu.

== Music Soundtrack CD ==
Music from Gardens of the World with Audrey Hepburn (Conifer/BMG 1993) was released in the fall of 1993, performed by the Artur Rubinstein Philharmonic Orchestra, conducted by Ilya Stupel.

1. Purcell Dido & Aeneas (Overture) – 2:30
2. Corelli Concerto Grosso Op.6/8 (3rd Movement) – 3:15
3. Debussy The girl with the flaxen hair (la fille aux cheveaux de lin) Andrew Wilde, piano – 3:06
4. Debussy Danse Profane – 4:30
5. Janáček The Cunning Little Vixen Suite (1st Movement) – 9:45
6. Grieg Holberg Suite (Gavotte) – 4:00
7. Ravel Piano Trio in A Minor: Modéré - Modere Alexandra Nauve, piano; Tomasz Golebieush, violin; Januari Batelli, cello – 11:00
8. Rameau (ed. Dukas) Les Paladins, 1st Suite Air pour les pagodes (Editions de L'Oiseau-Lyre) – 2:45
9. Respighi Antiche Arie e Danze Second Suite (Laura soave) – 3:52
10. Vivaldi Cello Concerto, RV 418 (1st movement) Arkadiusz Wlodarcyczk, cello – 4:03
11. Rameau (ed. Dukas) Les indes galantes: 3rd Suite (Danse des sauvages) – 2:00
12. Berlioz Les nuits d'ete (Le spectre de la rose) Agnieska Dabrowska, mezo-soprano – 7:15
13. Borodin String Quartet No. 1 (Scherzo) Artur Rubenstein Quartet: Piotr Redel, Tomasz Golebiewski, Miroslaw Pejski, Jolanta Braha – 5:09
14. Respighi Antiche Arie e Danze Third Suite (Siciliana) – 3:45
15. Copland Clarinet Concerto (1st movement) Roman Prylinski, clarinet – 9:15
16. Debussy orch. Caplet Children's Corner Suite (Doctor Gradas ad Parnassus) –2:41
