= EGOT =

Winners of the four main US performing art awards

EGOT is an acronym for the Emmy, Grammy, Oscar, and Tony Awards, referring to all four of the major performing art awards in the United States. These awards honor outstanding achievements in television, audio recording/music, film, and Broadway theatre respectively. Achieving the EGOT has been referred to as the "grand slam" of American show business. Including those with honorary or special awards, 28 people have achieved this status. Only one person, Robert Lopez, has won all four awards twice.

== Background ==
The EGOT acronym was coined by actor Philip Michael Thomas in late 1984. While starring in Miami Vice, he stated a desire to achieve the EGOT within five years. The acronym gained wider recognition following a 2009 episode of 30 Rock that introduced EGOT status as a recurring plotline. There is some debate over whether only the Primetime Emmy Award should count towards an EGOT, as some (including Thomas himself) distinguish the other types of Emmy competitions as subordinate to the Primetime honor.

Starting in 2016, the Daytime Emmy Awards had a category for Outstanding Musical Performance in a Daytime Program, which was removed after the 2019 ceremony because three of the four winners were Broadway ensembles, which between them included five people (Cynthia Erivo, Rachel Bay Jones, Katrina Lenk, Ben Platt, and Ari'el Stachel) who had already won Tony and Grammy awards for the shows they were in, and with their Daytime Emmy wins only needed Oscars to complete their EGOT status.

In 2023, TheaterMania writer Zachary Stewart criticized the practice of "selling" producer credits for shows favored to win a Tony as a "shortcut" to EGOT status. He drew a distinction between the producers who actually do the work of organizing the production of a show and investing producers who merely help finance it, often late in the award season.

Variety noted in 2026 that technology company Apple had achieved a 'studio EGOT', with various Emmy wins, an Oscar for CODA, a Grammy for "Bad as I Used to Be" from F1 (alongside the 2002 Technical Grammy Award), and multiple Tony awards for Schmigadoon! at the 79th Tony Awards.

== EGOT winners ==
=== Competitive EGOT ===
	Emmy	Grammy	Oscar	Tony	EGOT completed	Year span	Age at completion	Category(s)
Richard Rodgers	1962	1960 (Note: The artist also subsequently won one or more additional competitive awards.)	1946	1950 (Note: The artist also received one or more honorary or non-competitive awards.)	1962	16	59 years, 10 months	Composer and producer
Helen Hayes (Note: The artist also earned the Triple Crown of Acting, with singular (non-group/ensemble/company) acting wins in the Emmy, Oscar, and Tony awards.)	1953	1977	1932	1947	1977	45	76 years, 4 months	Actress
Rita Moreno	1977	1973	1962	1975	1977	15	45 years, 9 months	Actress and singer
John Gielgud	1991	1979	1982	1961	1991	29	87 years, 4 months	Actor and director
Audrey Hepburn	1993 (Note: The artist was awarded posthumously.)	1994	1954	1954	1994	40	63 years, 8 months	Actress
Marvin Hamlisch	1995	1974	1974	1976	1995	21	51 years, 3 months	Composer
Jonathan Tunick	1982	1988	1978	1997	1997	19	59 years, 1 month	Orchestrator, music arranger, composer, and conductor
Mel Brooks	1967	1998	1969	2001	2001	34	74 years, 11 months	Writer, songwriter, and actor
Mike Nichols	2001	1961	1968	1964	2001	40	69 years, 11 months	Director and comedian
Whoopi Goldberg	2002 (Note: The artist has won a Daytime Emmy Award, not a Primetime Emmy Award; some distinguish the Daytime prize and other types of Emmy competitions as subordinate to the Primetime honor.)	1986	1991	2002	2002	16	46 years, 6 months	Comedian, actress, host, and producer
Scott Rudin	1984	2012	2008	1994	2012	28	53 years, 6 months	Producer
Robert Lopez (Note: The songwriter is the only person who has won all four awards at least twice (Emmys [4], Grammys [3], Oscars [2] and Tonys [3]). Lopez is also the youngest person to achieve EGOT status (39 years, 8 days) and completed his first EGOT, at the time, in the shortest time (9 years, 8 months). His second set of wins briefly established a new shortest time at 7 years, 8 months, before being superseded later.)	2008 (Note: Lopez won two Daytime Emmy Awards in 2008 & 2010, followed by a Primetime Emmy Award in 2021, followed by a Children's and Family Emmy Award in 2022.)	2012	2014	2004	2014	10	39 years, 1 week	Songwriter and librettist
Andrew Lloyd Webber	2018 (Note: Legend, Lloyd Webber, and Rice achieved EGOT status simultaneously with their shared Primetime Emmy Award for producing Jesus Christ Superstar Live in Concert.)	1980	1997	1980	2018	38	70 years, 5 months	Composer and producer
Tim Rice	2018	1980	1993	1980	2018	38	73 years, 9 months	Lyricist, librettist, and producer
John Legend	2018	2006	2015	2017	2018	12	39 years, 8 months	Singer, composer, and producer
Alan Menken	2020	1991	1990	2012	2020	30	70 years, 11 months	Composer and producer
Jennifer Hudson	2021	2009	2007	2022	2022	15	40 years, 9 months	Singer, actress, host, and producer
Viola Davis	2015	2023	2017	2001	2023	22	57 years, 5 months	Actress and producer
Elton John	2024	1987	1995	2000	2024	37	76 years, 9 months	Singer, composer, pianist, and producer
Benj Pasek	2024	2018	2017	2017	2024	7	39 years, 2 months	Composer, lyricist, and producer
Justin Paul	2024	2018	2017	2017	2024	7	39 years, 8 months	Composer, lyricist, and producer
Steven Spielberg	1991 (Note: Spielberg initially won a Daytime Emmy in 1991, before winning a Primetime Emmy in 1996)	2026	1994	2022	2026	35	79 years, 1 month	Director and producer

=== Non-competitive EGOT ===
Name	Emmy	Grammy	Oscar	Tony	EGOT completed	Year Span	Honorary Award	Category(s)
Barbra Streisand	1965	1964	1969	1970	1970	6	Special Tony Award	Actress and singer
Liza Minnelli	1973	1990	1973	1965	1990	25	Grammy Legend Award	Actress and singer
James Earl Jones	1991	1977	2011	1969	2011	42	Academy Honorary Award	Actor and voice actor
Harry Belafonte	1960	1961	2014	1954	2014	60	Jean Hersholt Humanitarian Award	Activist, actor, and singer
Quincy Jones	1977	1964	1994	2016	2016	52	Jean Hersholt Humanitarian Award	Composer, musician, and producer
Frank Marshall	2023 (Note: Marshall has won a Sports Emmy Award, not a Primetime Emmy Award; some distinguish the other types of Emmy competitions as subordinate to the Primetime honor.)	2023	2019	2022	2023	4	Irving G. Thalberg Memorial Award	Director and producer

== Competitive EGOT awardees ==
=== Richard Rodgers ===
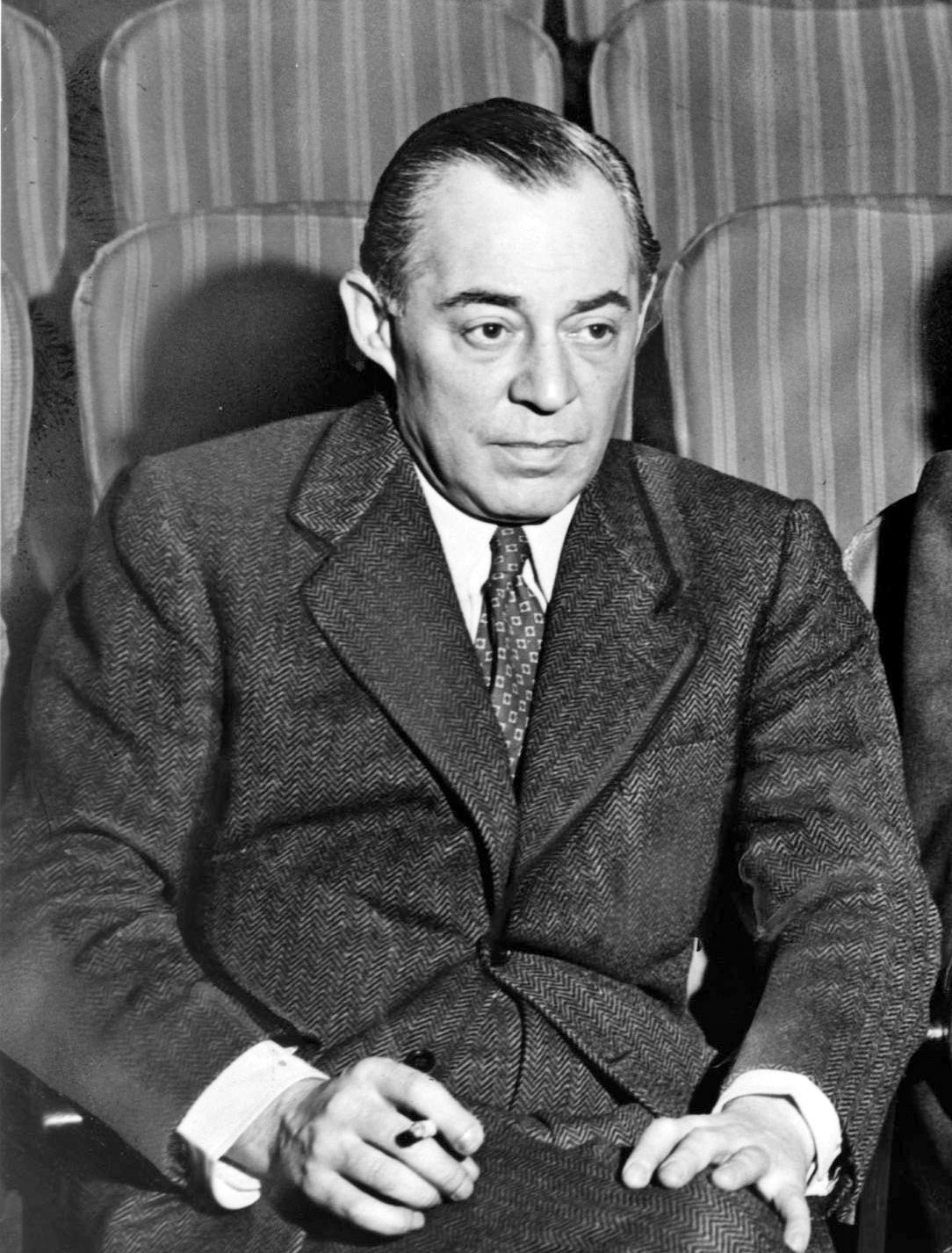
In 1962, Richard Rodgers became the first person to win all four awards.

American composer Richard Rodgers (1902–1979) received his fourth distinct award in 1962. Between 1946 and 1979, Rodgers received a total of 10 competitive awards. He was the first person to win all four and was primarily a composer.

- Academy Awards:
1. 1946: Best Song – "It Might as Well Be Spring" (from State Fair)
- Primetime Emmy Awards:
1. 1962: Outstanding Achievement in Original Music Composed for Television – Winston Churchill: The Valiant Years
- Grammy Awards:
1. 1961: Best Show Album (Original Cast) – The Sound of Music
2. 1963: Best Original Cast Show Album – No Strings
- Tony Awards:
1. 1950: Best Musical – South Pacific
2. 1950: Producers (Musical) – South Pacific
3. 1950: Best Score – South Pacific
4. 1952: Best Musical – The King and I
5. 1960: Best Musical – The Sound of Music
6. 1962: Best Composer – No Strings
- Special Awards:
1. 1962: Special Tony Award "for all he has done for young people in the theatre and for taking the men of the orchestra out of the pit and putting them onstage in No Strings"
2. 1972: Special Tony Award
3. 1979: Special Tony Award – Lawrence Langner Memorial Award for Distinguished Lifetime Achievement in the American Theatre

=== Helen Hayes ===
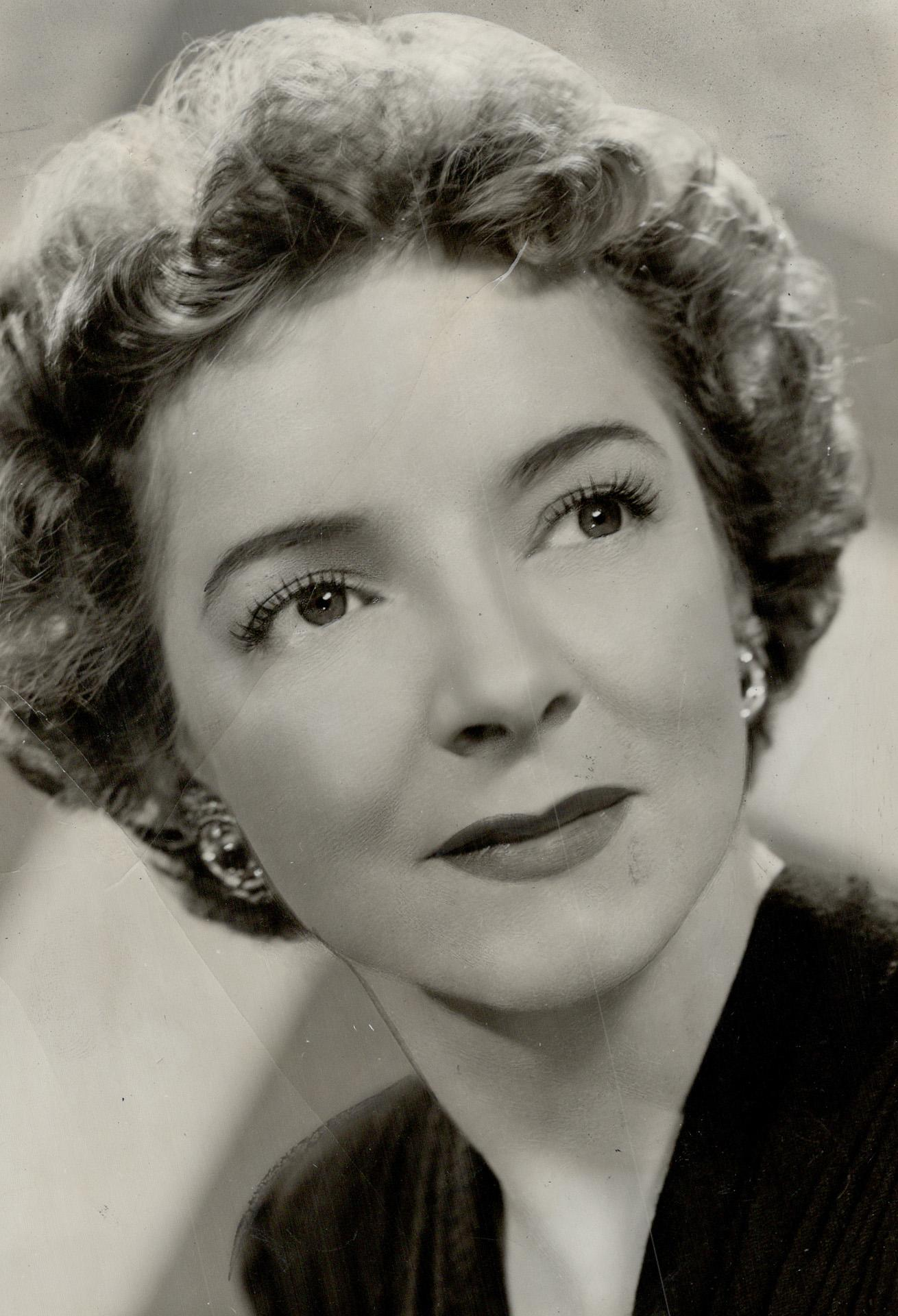
In 1977, Helen Hayes became the second person and first woman to win all four awards.

American actress Helen Hayes (1900–1993) received her fourth distinct award in 1977. Between 1932 and 1980, Hayes received a total of six competitive awards. She was the first woman and the first performer to win all four. Hayes was also the first EGOT recipient to win the Triple Crown of Acting (with individual acting wins in each of the Emmy, Oscar, and Tony awards). Counting only the first award of each type, she also has the longest interval (45 years) between her first and fourth award of any EGOT winner.

- Academy Awards:
1. 1932: Best Actress in a Leading Role – The Sin of Madelon Claudet
2. 1971: Best Actress in a Supporting Role – Airport
- Primetime Emmy Awards:
1. 1953: Best Actress – Schlitz Playhouse of Stars (Episode: "Not a Chance")
- Grammy Awards:
1. 1977: Best Spoken Word Recording – Great American Documents
- Tony Awards:
1. 1947: Best Actress in a Play – Happy Birthday
2. 1958: Best Leading Actress in a Play – Time Remembered
- Special Awards:
1. 1980: Special Tony Award – Lawrence Langner Memorial Award for Distinguished Lifetime Achievement in the American Theatre

=== Rita Moreno ===
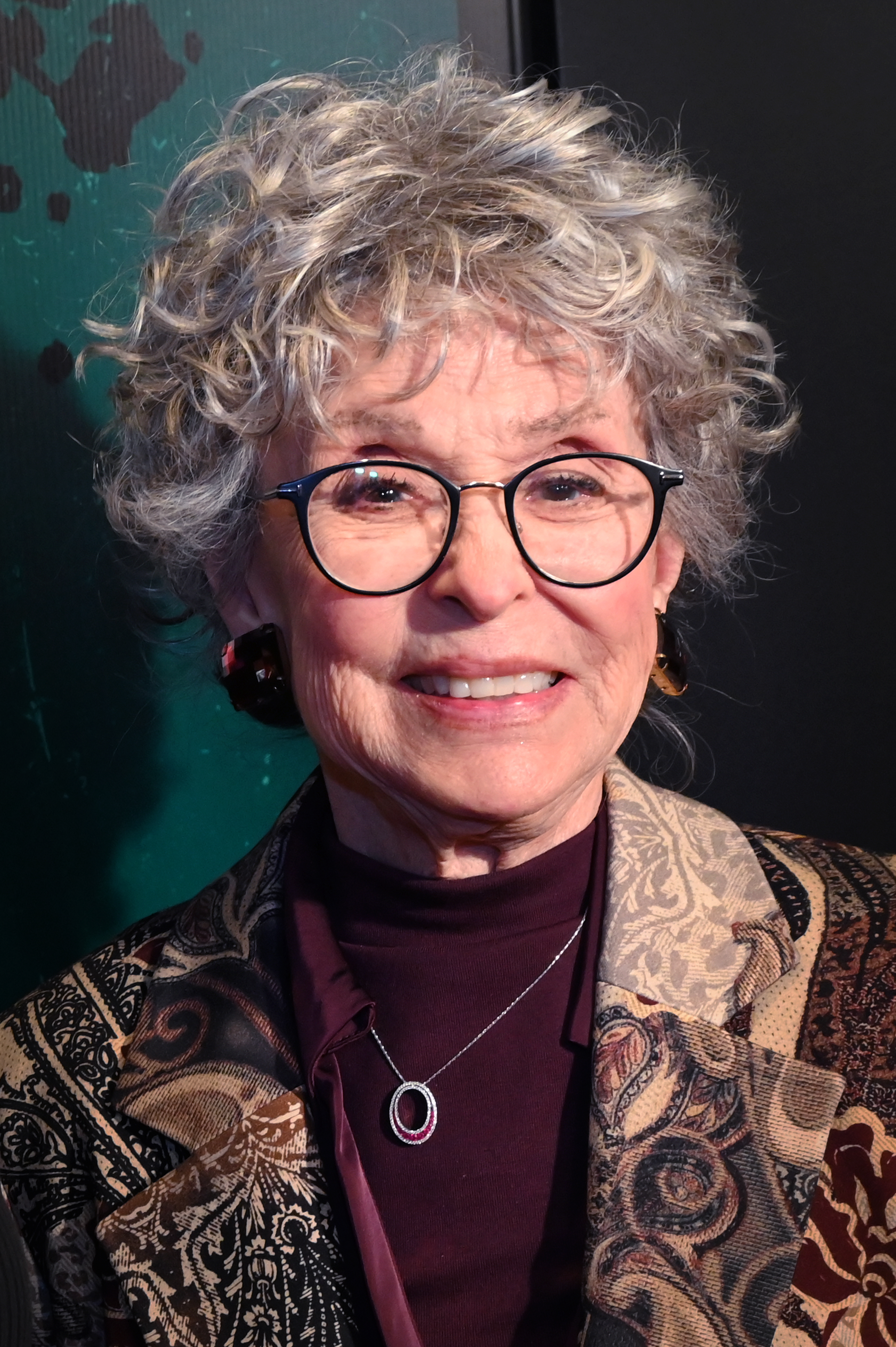
In 1977, Rita Moreno became the third person and first Hispanic American to win all four awards.

Puerto Rican actress, dancer, and singer Rita Moreno (born 1931) received her fourth distinct award in 1977. Between 1961 and 1978, Moreno received a total of five awards. She is also the first Latina winner and the first winner to win a Grammy as their second award (both previous winners won Tonys as their second award). In addition, she became a Kennedy Center Honoree in 2015 and a Peabody Award winner in 2019. Moreno is also the second EGOT recipient and the first Hispanic actress to win the Triple Crown of Acting.

- Academy Awards:
1. 1962: Best Actress in a Supporting Role – West Side Story
- Primetime Emmy Awards:
1. 1977: Outstanding Continuing or Single Performance by a Supporting Actress in Variety or Music – The Muppet Show (Episode: "Rita Moreno")
2. 1978: Outstanding Lead Actress for a Single Appearance in a Drama or Comedy Series – The Rockford Files (Episode: "The Paper Palace")
- Grammy Awards:
1. 1973: Best Recording for Children – The Electric Company
- Tony Awards:
1. 1975: Best Supporting or Featured Actress in a Play – The Ritz

=== John Gielgud ===
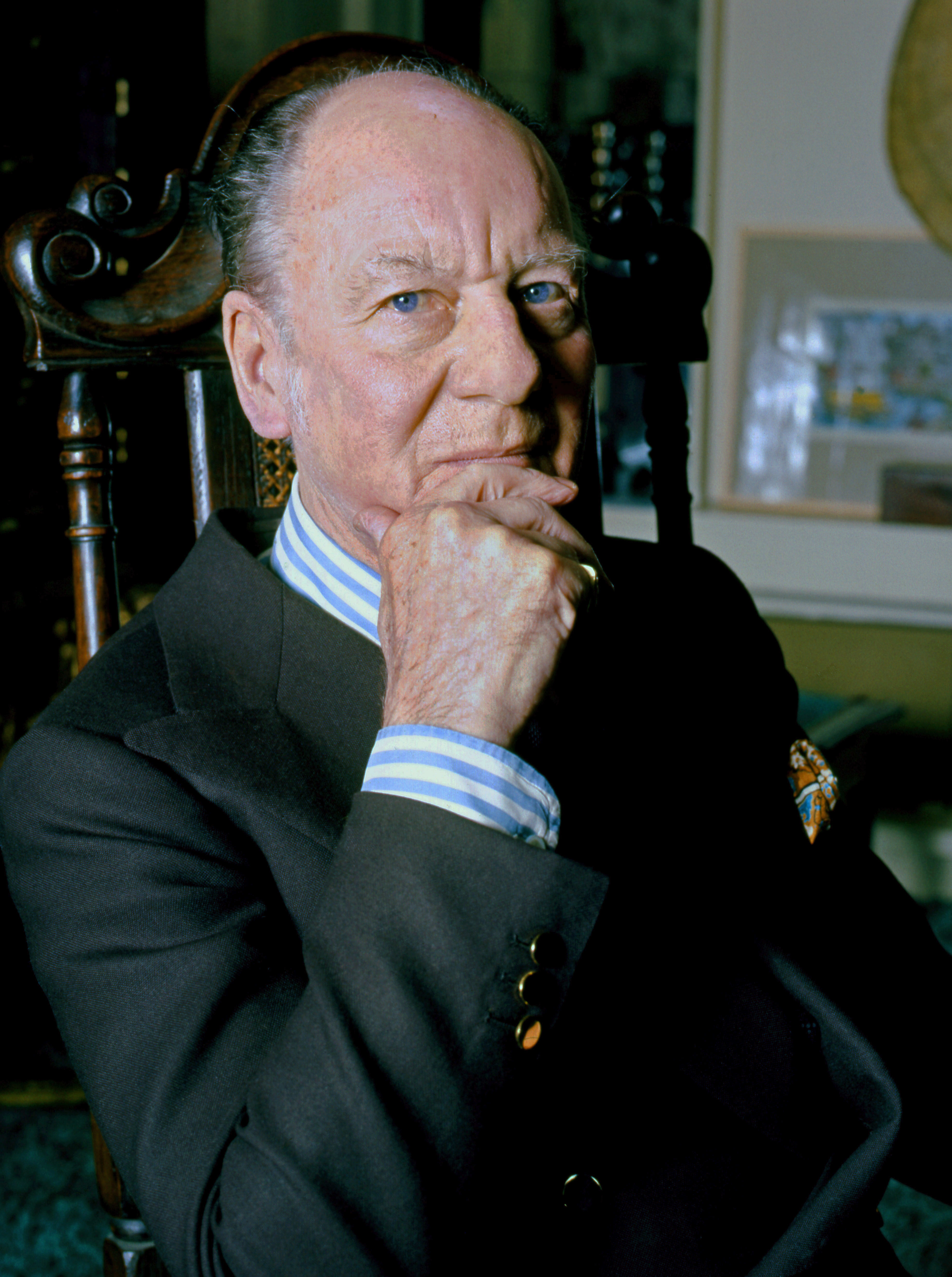
In 1991, John Gielgud became the fourth person, the oldest (at age 87), the first LGBTQ person and first non-American to win all four awards.

English actor and theatre director John Gielgud (1904–2000) received his fourth distinct award in 1991. Between 1948 and 1991, Gielgud received a total of five competitive awards. Gielgud was the first winner to win any award other than the Oscar as their first award (his first award was a Tony). At age 87 when he won his Emmy, he also became the oldest winner, the first male performer, the first LGBTQ winner, and the first non-American.

- Academy Awards:
1. 1982: Best Actor in a Supporting Role – Arthur
- Primetime Emmy Awards:
1. 1991: Outstanding Lead Actor in a Miniseries or a Special – Summer's Lease
- Grammy Awards:
1. 1980: Best Spoken Word, Documentary or Drama Recording – Ages of Man
- Tony Awards:
1. 1948: Outstanding Foreign Company – The Importance of Being Earnest
2. 1961: Best Director of a Drama – Big Fish, Little Fish
- Special Awards:
1. 1959: Special Tony Award "for contribution to theatre for his extraordinary insight into the writings of Shakespeare as demonstrated in his one-man play Ages of Man."

=== Audrey Hepburn ===
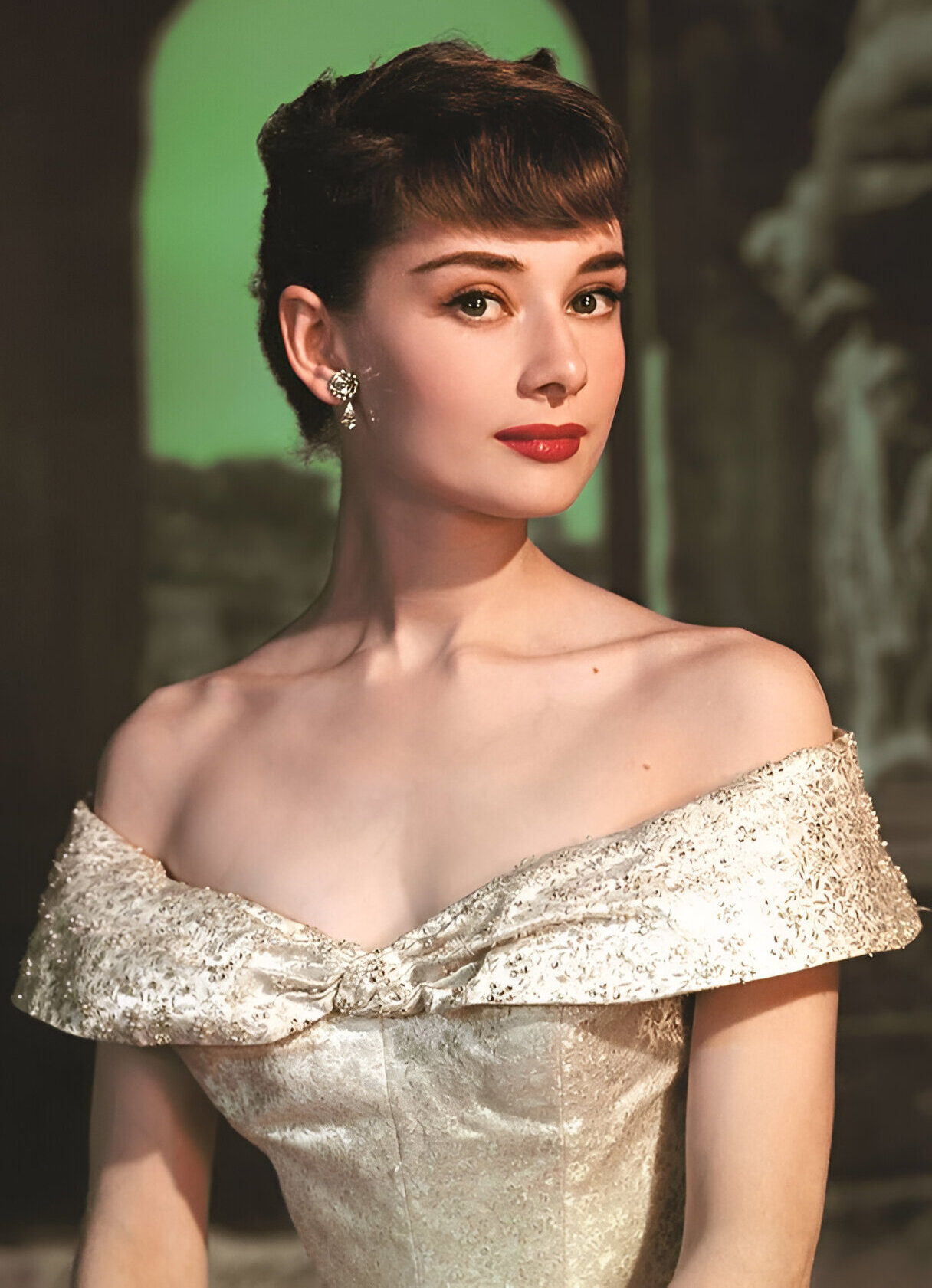
In 1994, Audrey Hepburn became the fifth person to win all four awards, and the first to do so posthumously.

British actress and humanitarian Audrey Hepburn (1929–1993) received her fourth distinct award posthumously in 1994. Between 1954 and 1994, Hepburn received a total of four competitive awards. She was the fifth person to complete the feat and the first to do so posthumously. She was also the first winner to win two of their awards in consecutive awards shows (the 1994 Grammys were the first Grammys since her posthumous win at the 1993 Emmys). She is the only EGOT winner to not win multiple awards in any of the four award fields.

- Academy Awards:
1. 1954: Best Actress in a Leading Role – Roman Holiday
- Primetime Emmy Awards:
1. 1993: Outstanding Individual Achievement – Informational Programming – Gardens of the World with Audrey Hepburn (Episode: "Flower Gardens")
- Grammy Awards:
1. 1994: Best Spoken Word Album for Children – Audrey Hepburn's Enchanted Tales
- Tony Awards:
1. 1954: Distinguished Dramatic Actress – Ondine
- Special Awards:
1. 1968: Special Tony Award
2. 1993: Jean Hersholt Humanitarian Award

=== Marvin Hamlisch ===
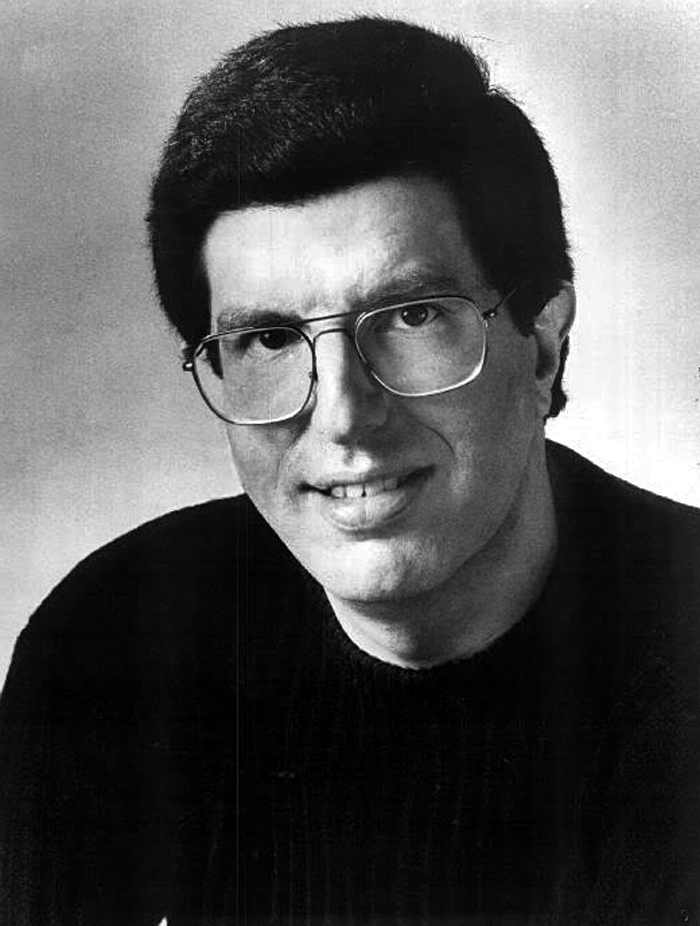
In 1995, Marvin Hamlisch became the sixth person to win all four awards.

American composer and conductor Marvin Hamlisch (1944–2012) received his fourth distinct award in 1995. Between 1974 and 2001, Hamlisch received a total of 12 competitive awards. Before Alan Menken joined the group in 2020, Hamlisch had the most Oscars of any EGOT winner (three – all won in the same year). In 1974 he would win "General Field" Grammys, taking Song of the Year and Best New Artist, making him first EGOT to have this distinction. Hamlisch was also the first EGOT winner to have won multiple, qualifying awards for the same work – both an Oscar and a Grammy for the song "The Way We Were".

- Academy Awards:
1. 1974: Best Original Dramatic Score – The Way We Were
2. 1974: Best Scoring: Original Song Score and Adaptation or Scoring: Adaptation – The Sting
3. 1974: Best Song – "The Way We Were" (from The Way We Were)
- Primetime Emmy Awards:
1. 1995: Outstanding Individual Achievement in Music Direction – Barbra: The Concert
2. 1995: Outstanding Individual Achievement in Music and Lyrics – "Ordinary Miracles" (from Barbra: The Concert)
3. 1999: Outstanding Music and Lyrics – "A Ticket to Dream" (from AFI's 100 Years... 100 Movies)
4. 2001: Outstanding Music Direction – Timeless: Live in Concert
- Grammy Awards:
1. 1975: Best New Artist
2. 1975: Song of the Year – "The Way We Were"
3. 1975: Best Pop Instrumental Performance – "The Entertainer"
4. 1975: Album of Best Original Score Written for a Motion Picture or a Television Special – The Way We Were: Original Soundtrack Recording
- Tony Awards:
1. 1976: Best Musical Score – A Chorus Line

=== Jonathan Tunick ===
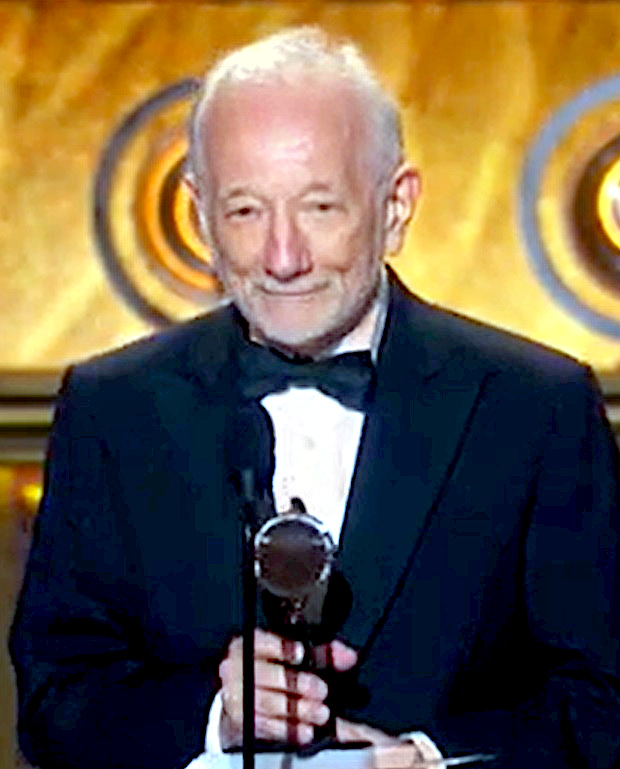
In 1997, Jonathan Tunick became the seventh person to win all four awards.

American orchestrator, musical director, and composer Jonathan Tunick (born 1938) received his fourth distinct award in 1997. Between 1977 and 2024, Tunick received a total of five awards. Tunick is the first EGOT winner to have won an Emmy as their second award as well as the first to win the Tony as their fourth award.

- Academy Awards:
1. 1978: Best Original Song Score and Its Adaptation or Adaptation Score – A Little Night Music
- Primetime Emmy Awards:
1. 1982: Outstanding Achievement in Music Direction – Night of 100 Stars
- Grammy Awards:
1. 1989: Best Instrumental Arrangement Accompanying Vocal(s) – "No One is Alone" (vocals by Cleo Laine)
- Tony Awards:
1. 1997: Best Orchestrations – Titanic
2. 2024: Best Orchestrations – Merrily We Roll Along

=== Mel Brooks ===
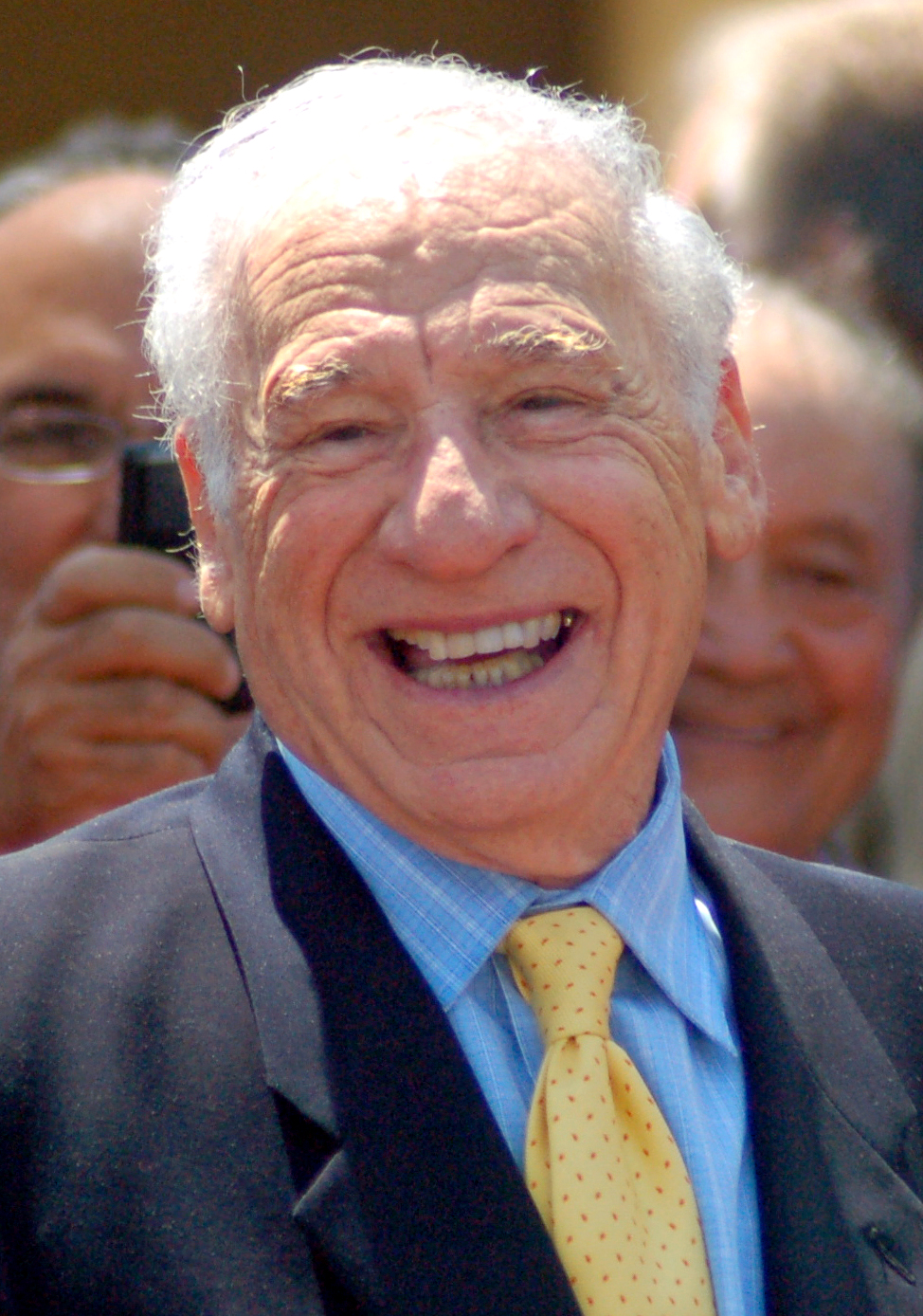
In 2001, Mel Brooks became the eighth person to win all four awards.

American actor, comedian, and filmmaker Mel Brooks (born 1926) received his fourth distinct award in June 2001. Between 1968 and 2002, Brooks received a total of 11 awards. Brooks was the first person to win the Emmy as the first award, and the first winner to have won his Oscar for screenwriting. He is the only person to have won the Triple Crown of Writing, having won an Oscar, an Emmy and a Tony in writing categories.

- Academy Awards:
1. 1969: Best Story and Screenplay – Written Directly for the Screen – The Producers
- Primetime Emmy Awards:
1. 1967: Outstanding Writing Achievement in Variety – The Sid Caesar, Imogene Coca, Carl Reiner, Howard Morris Special
2. 1997: Outstanding Guest Actor in a Comedy Series – Mad About You (Episodes: "The Grant" and "The Penis")
3. 1998: Outstanding Guest Actor in a Comedy Series – Mad About You (Episode: "Uncle Phil and the Coupons")
4. 1999: Outstanding Guest Actor in a Comedy Series – Mad About You (Episode: "Uncle Phil Goes Back to High School")
- Grammy Awards:
1. 1999: Best Spoken Comedy Album – The 2000 Year Old Man in the Year 2000
2. 2002: Best Long Form Music Video – Recording 'The Producers': A Musical Romp with Mel Brooks
3. 2002: Best Musical Show Album – The Producers
- Tony Awards:
1. 2001: Best Musical – The Producers
2. 2001: Best Book of a Musical – The Producers
3. 2001: Best Original Score – The Producers
- Special Awards
1. 2023: Academy Honorary Award – "Mel Brooks lights up our hearts with his humor, and his legacy has made a lasting impact on every facet of entertainment."

Brooks is one of only two people to have two awards of each type, though unlike the other (Robert Lopez) one of Brooks's Oscars was honorary. When he appeared on the January 30, 2015 episode of Real Time with Bill Maher, Brooks called himself an EGOTAK, noting that he had also received awards from the American Film Institute and Kennedy Center.

=== Mike Nichols ===
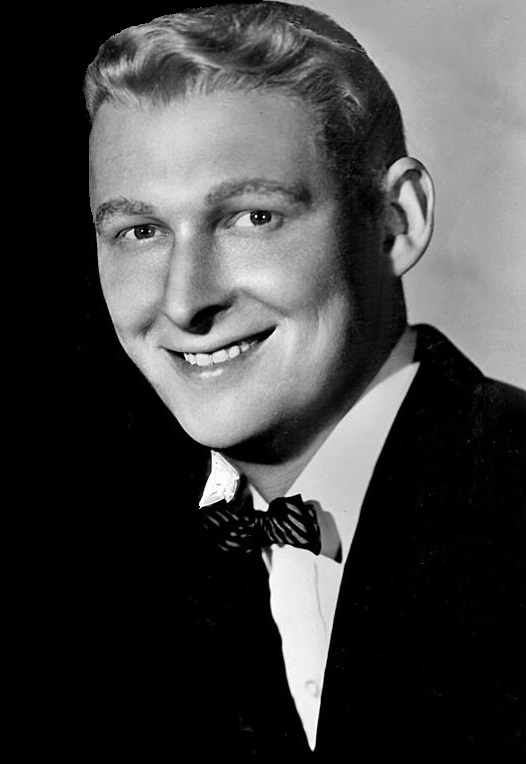
In 2001, Mike Nichols became the ninth person to win all four awards.

American film and theater director, producer, actor, and comedian Mike Nichols (1931–2014) received his fourth distinct award in November 2001. Between 1961 and 2012, Nichols received a total of 15 awards. Nichols was the first EGOT winner to win the Grammy as their first award, the first winner to have won multiple awards for directing (an Oscar, several Tonys, and two Emmys) . When counting all awards won—not just the first of each type—Nichols has the longest timespan of awards among EGOT winners, at 51 years. He is one of only 2 people, the other being Bob Fosse, to achieve the Triple Crown of Directing, having won an Oscar, an Emmy and a Tony in directing categories.

- Academy Awards:
1. 1968: Best Director – The Graduate
- Primetime Emmy Awards:
1. 2001: Outstanding Made for Television Movie – Wit
2. 2001: Outstanding Directing for a Miniseries or a Movie – Wit
3. 2004: Outstanding Miniseries – Angels in America
4. 2004: Outstanding Directing for a Miniseries, Movie or a Dramatic Special – Angels in America
- Grammy Awards:
1. 1962: Best Comedy Performance – An Evening with Mike Nichols and Elaine May
- Tony Awards:
1. 1964: Best Direction of a Play – Barefoot in the Park
2. 1965: Best Direction of a Play – Luv and The Odd Couple
3. 1968: Best Direction of a Play – Plaza Suite
4. 1972: Best Direction of a Play – The Prisoner of Second Avenue
5. 1977: Best Musical – Annie
6. 1984: Best Play – The Real Thing
7. 1984: Best Direction of a Play – The Real Thing
8. 2005: Best Direction of a Musical – Monty Python's Spamalot
9. 2012: Best Direction of a Play – Death of a Salesman

=== Whoopi Goldberg ===
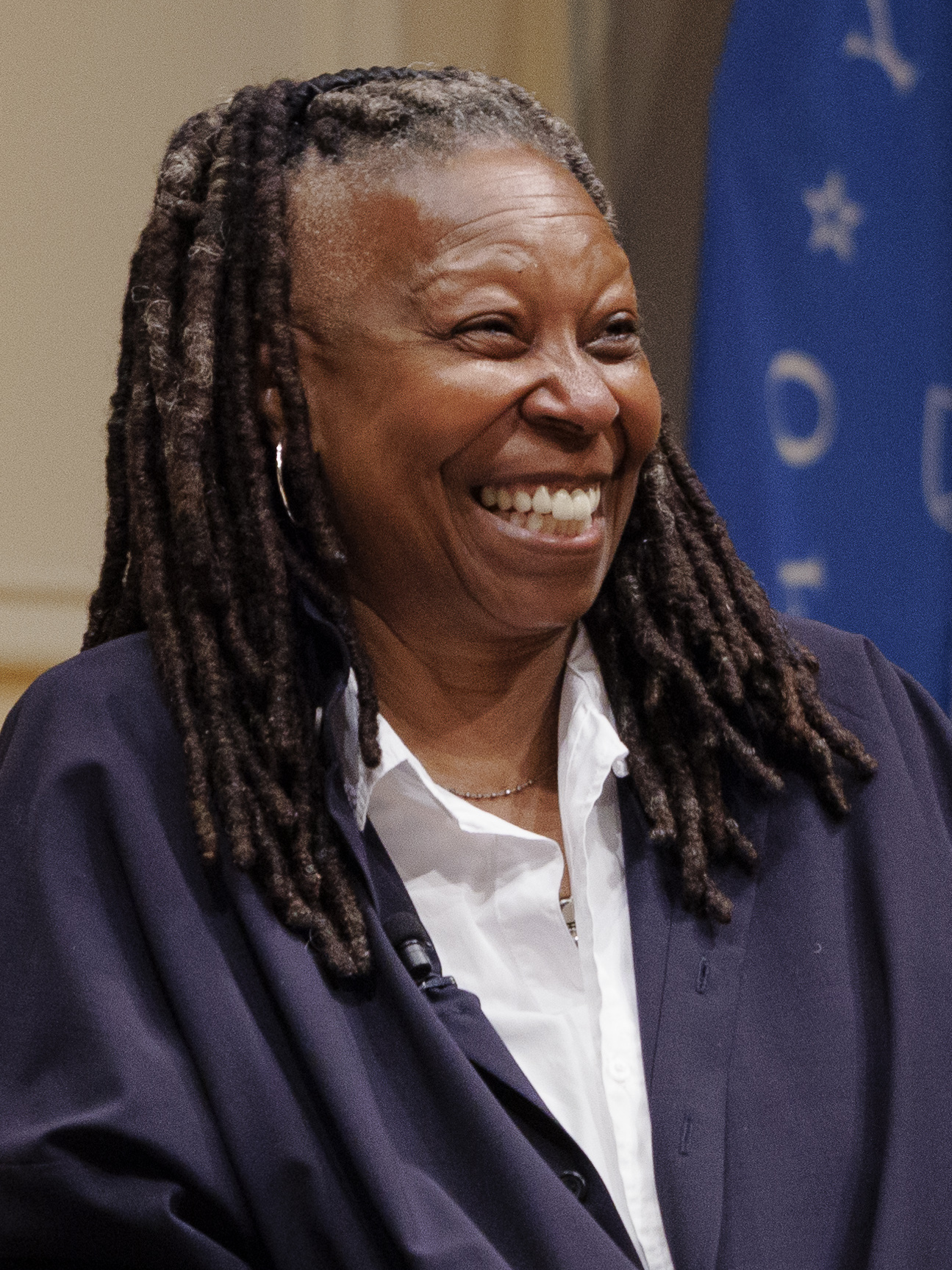
In 2002, Whoopi Goldberg became the tenth person and the first African American to win all four awards and the first to win two in the same year.

American actress, comedian and author Whoopi Goldberg (born 1955) received her fourth distinct award in 2002. Between 1985 and 2009, she received a total of five competitive awards. Goldberg is the first African American winner, the first to win the Oscar as their second award, and the third person after Audrey Hepburn (1954) and Marvin Hamlisch (1974) to win two of their qualifying awards in the same year (she won both her Tony and her first competitive Emmy in 2002).

- Academy Awards:
1. 1991: Best Actress in a Supporting Role – Ghost
- Daytime Emmy Awards:
1. 2002: Outstanding Special Class Special – Beyond Tara: The Extraordinary Life of Hattie McDaniel
2. 2009: Outstanding Talk Show Host – The View
- Grammy Awards:
1. 1986: Best Comedy Recording – Whoopi Goldberg: Original Broadway Show Recording
- Tony Awards:
1. 2002: Best Musical – Thoroughly Modern Millie
- Special Awards:
1. 1997: Primetime Emmy Governors Award "for the seven Comic Relief Benefit Specials"

=== Scott Rudin ===
American film, television, and theatre producer Scott Rudin (born 1958) received his fourth distinct award in 2012. Between 1984 and 2026, Rudin received a total of 22 awards, tying with Alan Menken for winning the most competitive EGOT awards. Rudin is currently the only EGOT winner who is solely a producer and did not win any of his four awards for a creative endeavor (i.e. singing, writing, acting).

- Academy Awards:
1. 2008: Best Picture – No Country for Old Men
- Primetime Emmy Awards:
1. 1984: Outstanding Children's Program – He Makes Me Feel Like Dancin'
- Grammy Awards:
1. 2012: Best Musical Theater Album – The Book of Mormon: Original Broadway Cast Recording
- Tony Awards:
1. 1994: Best Musical – Passion
2. 2000: Best Play – Copenhagen
3. 2002: Best Play – The Goat, or Who Is Sylvia?
4. 2005: Best Play – Doubt
5. 2006: Best Play – The History Boys
6. 2009: Best Play – God of Carnage
7. 2010: Best Revival of a Play – Fences
8. 2011: Best Musical – The Book of Mormon
9. 2012: Best Revival of a Play – Death of a Salesman
10. 2014: Best Revival of a Play – A Raisin in the Sun
11. 2015: Best Play – The Curious Incident of the Dog in the Night-Time
12. 2015: Best Revival of a Play – Skylight
13. 2016: Best Play – The Humans
14. 2016: Best Revival of a Play – A View From the Bridge
15. 2017: Best Revival of a Musical – Hello, Dolly!
16. 2019: Best Play – The Ferryman
17. 2019: Best Revival of a Play – The Boys in the Band
18. 2021: Best Play – The Inheritance
19. 2026: Best Revival of a Play – Death of a Salesman

=== Robert Lopez ===
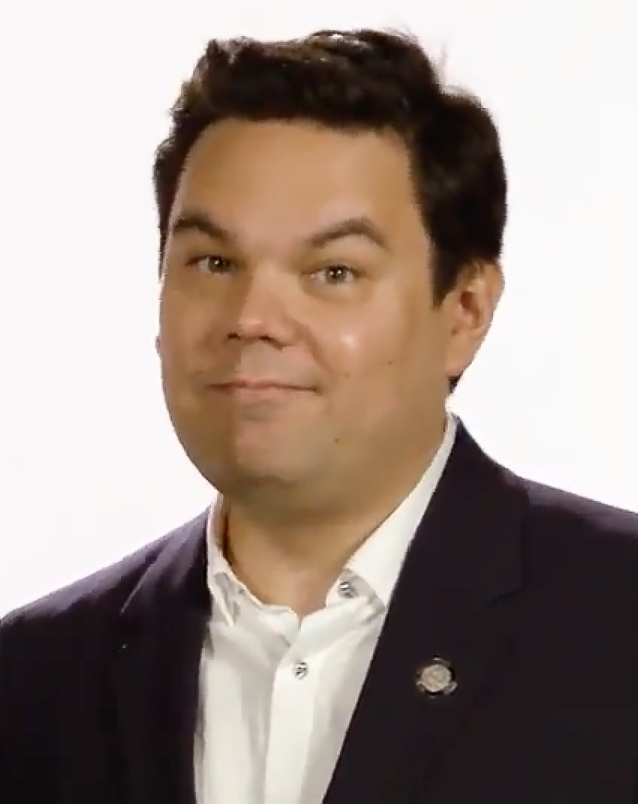
In 2014, Robert Lopez became the twelfth person, the first Asian American and the youngest (at age 39) to win all four awards.

American songwriter Robert Lopez (born 1975) received his fourth distinct award in 2014. Between 2004 and 2022, he received a total of 12 awards. He is the first Filipino and Asian to achieve this feat. He is the youngest winner (39 years, 8 days) to receive all four awards in competitive categories, as well as, at the time, the fastest to complete his qualifying run of EGOT wins (9 years, 8 months). His second series of wins set a new shortest interval of 7 years, 8 months (June 27, 2010 Emmy through March 4th, 2018 Academy Award) until 2024 when both Benj Pasek and Justin Paul topped this record with a qualifying run of 7 years and 7 months.

Lopez is the first person to win each EGOT award twice. As of 2025, he is one Oscar away from becoming the first triple EGOT winner as well. He is currently the only winner to have two of each EGOT award in competitive categories, as Mel Brooks' second Oscar in 2023 was a special award. His first two Emmys were Daytime Emmys, followed by a Primetime Emmy in 2021 for WandaVision. He is the only EGOT recipient to follow a Daytime Emmy win with a subsequent Primetime Emmy win.

Lopez received his Grammy Award for The Book of Mormon in collaboration with fellow EGOT winner Scott Rudin (among others), making them the first pair of EGOT winners to co-win the same award. Lopez is also the first person to have won the Oscar last, a prize he shared then, and again in 2018, with his wife Kristen Anderson-Lopez. As of 2024, Kristen Anderson-Lopez lacks only a Tony to achieve EGOT status in her own right.

- Academy Awards:
1. 2014: Best Original Song – "Let It Go" (from Frozen)
2. 2018: Best Original Song – "Remember Me" (from Coco)
- Primetime Emmy Awards:
1. 2021: Outstanding Original Music and Lyrics – "Agatha All Along" (from WandaVision — Episode: "Breaking the Fourth Wall")
- Daytime Emmy Awards:
1. 2008: Outstanding Music Direction and Composition – Wonder Pets!
2. 2010: Outstanding Music Direction and Composition – Wonder Pets!
- Children's and Family Emmy Awards:
1. 2022: Outstanding Short Form Program – We the People
- Grammy Awards:
1. 2012: Best Musical Theater Album – The Book of Mormon: Original Broadway Cast Recording
2. 2015: Best Compilation Soundtrack for Visual Media – Frozen
3. 2015: Best Song Written for Visual Media – "Let It Go" (from Frozen)
- Tony Awards:
1. 2004: Best Original Score – Avenue Q
2. 2011: Best Book of a Musical – The Book of Mormon
3. 2011: Best Original Score – The Book of Mormon

=== Andrew Lloyd Webber ===
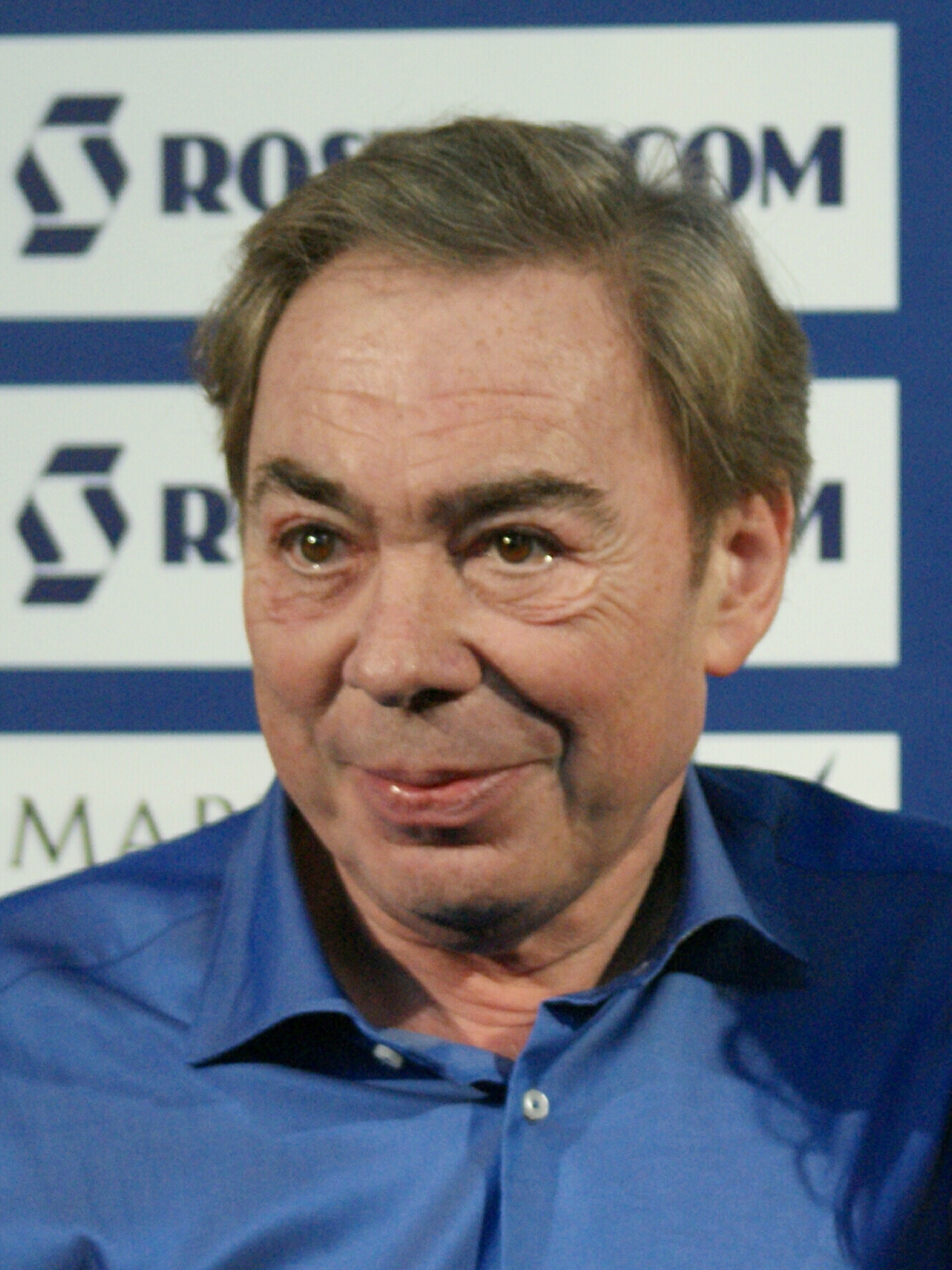
In 2018, Andrew Lloyd Webber became the thirteenth person to win all four awards.

English composer and impresario of musical theatre Andrew Lloyd Webber, Baron Lloyd-Webber (born 1948) received his fourth distinct award in 2018. Between 1980 and 2025, Lloyd Webber received a total of 12 competitive awards. On September 9, 2018, Lloyd Webber, John Legend, and Tim Rice all simultaneously became EGOTs when they were collectively awarded the Primetime Emmy Award for Outstanding Variety Special (Live) for Jesus Christ Superstar Live in Concert.

- Academy Awards:
1. 1997: Best Original Song – "You Must Love Me" (from Evita)
- Primetime Emmy Awards:
1. 2018: Outstanding Variety Special (Live) – Jesus Christ Superstar Live in Concert
- Grammy Awards:
1. 1981: Best Cast Show Album – Evita: Premier American Recording
2. 1984: Best Cast Show Album – Cats: Complete Original Broadway Cast Recording
3. 1986: Best Contemporary Composition – Lloyd Webber: Requiem
- Tony Awards:
1. 1980: Best Original Score – Evita
2. 1983: Best Musical – Cats
3. 1983: Best Original Score – Cats
4. 1988: Best Musical – The Phantom of the Opera
5. 1995: Best Musical – Sunset Boulevard
6. 1995: Best Original Score – Sunset Boulevard
7. 2025: Best Revival of a Musical – Sunset Boulevard
- Special Awards:
1. 1990: Grammy Legend Award
2. 2018: Special Tony Award

=== Tim Rice ===
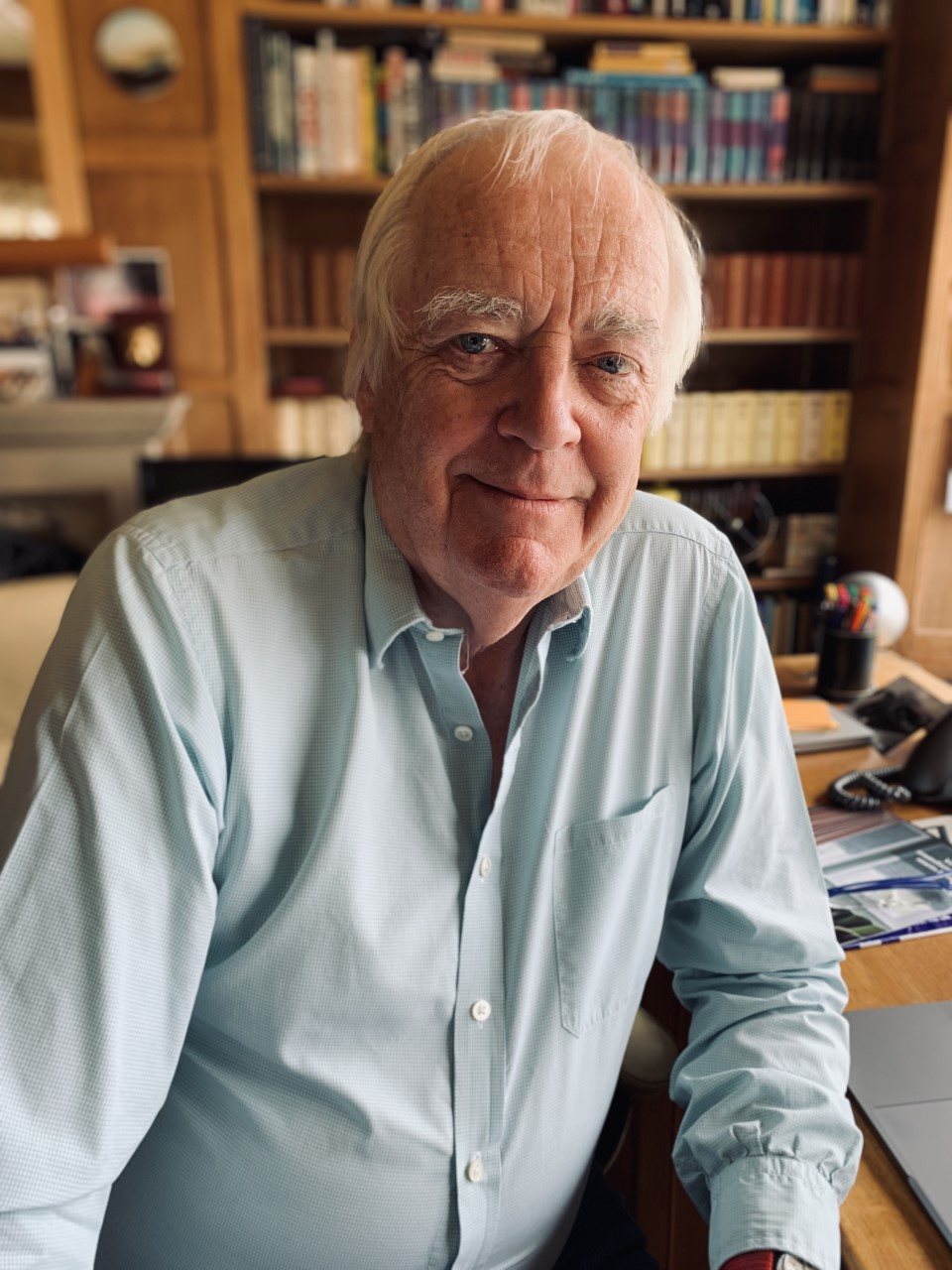
In 2018, Tim Rice became the fourteenth person to win all four awards.

English lyricist and librettist Tim Rice (born 1944) received his fourth distinct award in 2018. Between 1980 and 2018, Rice received a total of 12 awards, and shares all of his awards with fellow EGOTs Elton John, John Legend, Andrew Lloyd Webber, and Alan Menken. On September 9, 2018, Lloyd Webber, Legend, and Rice all simultaneously became EGOTs when they were collectively awarded the Primetime Emmy Award for Outstanding Variety Special (Live) for Jesus Christ Superstar Live in Concert.

- Academy Awards:
1. 1993: Best Original Song – "A Whole New World" (from Aladdin)
2. 1995: Best Original Song – "Can You Feel the Love Tonight" (from The Lion King)
3. 1997: Best Original Song – "You Must Love Me" (from Evita)
- Primetime Emmy Awards:
1. 2018: Outstanding Variety Special (Live) – Jesus Christ Superstar Live in Concert
- Grammy Awards:
1. 1981: Best Cast Show Album – Evita: Premier American Recording
2. 1994: Song of the Year – "A Whole New World (Aladdin's Theme)"
3. 1994: Best Musical Album for Children – Aladdin: Original Motion Picture Soundtrack
4. 1994: Best Song Written Specifically for a Motion Picture or Television – "A Whole New World (Aladdin's Theme)" (from Aladdin)
5. 2001: Best Musical Show Album – Elton John and Tim Rice's Aida
- Tony Awards:
1. 1980: Best Book of a Musical – Evita
2. 1980: Best Original Score – Evita
3. 2000: Best Original Score – Aida

=== John Legend ===
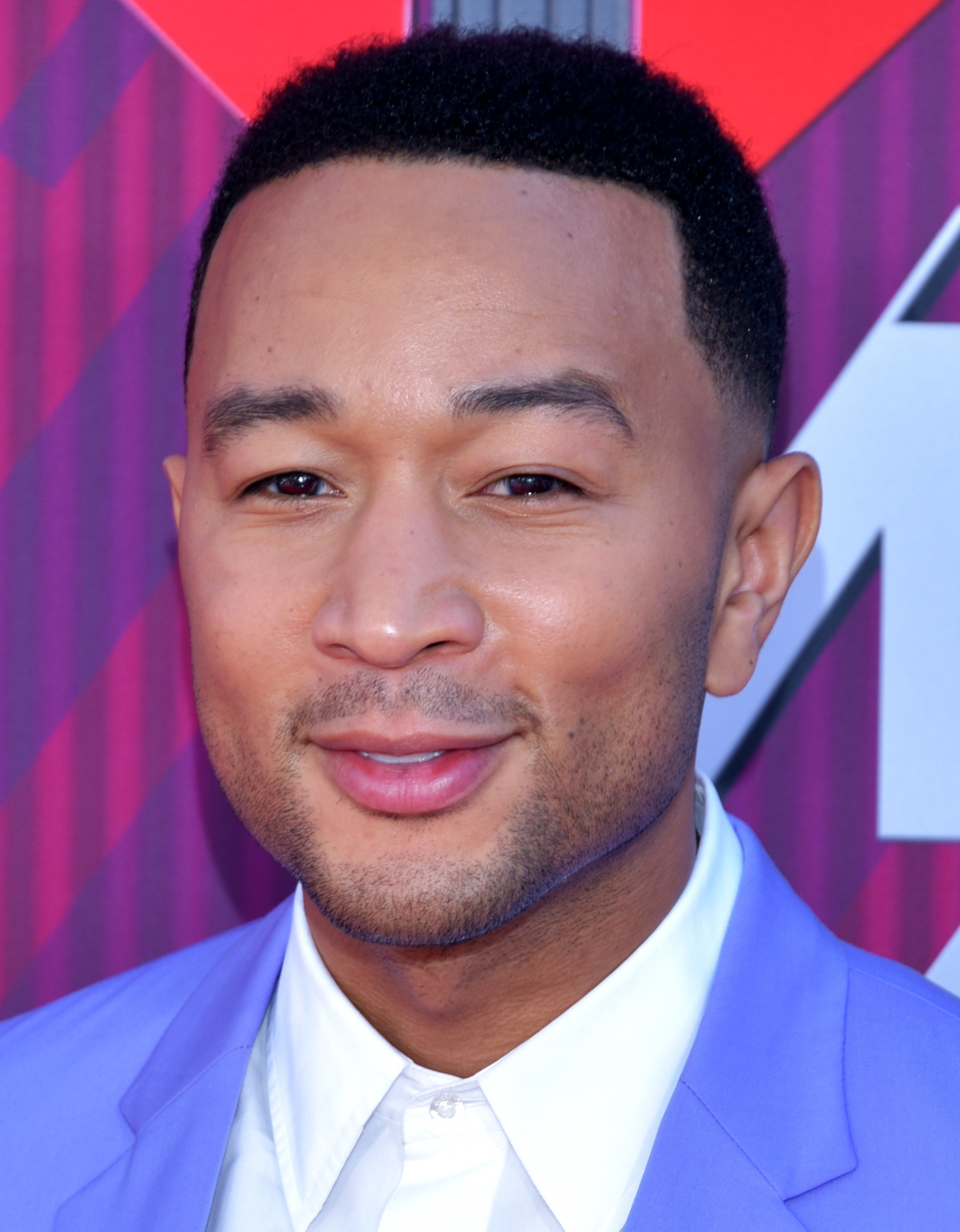
In 2018, John Legend became the fifteenth person and the first African American man to win all four awards, and first to have won both competitive Primetime and Daytime Emmy Awards.

American singer, songwriter, pianist, and record producer John Legend (born 1978) received his fourth distinct award in 2018. Between 2006 and 2025, Legend received a total of 21 awards. Legend has won the most Grammy Awards, 12, of any competitive EGOT recipient. In addition to being the first African American man to achieve EGOT status, Legend is the first person to receive the four awards in four consecutive years. Legend was also the first EGOT recipient to have won both a competitive Primetime and Daytime Emmy Award, an accomplishment matched by Robert Lopez in 2021. Legend, Andrew Lloyd Webber, and Tim Rice all simultaneously became EGOTs on September 9, 2018, when they were collectively awarded the Primetime Emmy Award for Outstanding Variety Special (Live) for Jesus Christ Superstar Live in Concert.

- Academy Awards:
1. 2015: Best Original Song – "Glory" (from Selma)
- Primetime Emmy Awards:
1. 2018: Outstanding Variety Special (Live) – Jesus Christ Superstar Live in Concert
- Daytime Emmy Awards:
1. 2019: Outstanding Interactive Media for a Daytime Program – Crow: The Legend
2. 2022: Outstanding Daytime Special – Shelter Me: Soul Awakened
3. 2022: Outstanding Short Form Daytime Program – Cornerstones: Founding Voices of the Black Church
- Children's and Family Emmy Awards:
1. 2023: Outstanding Non-Fiction Program – 1000% Me: Growing Up Mixed
2. 2025: Outstanding Non-Fiction Program – Stand Up & Shout: Songs from a Philly High School
- Grammy Awards:
1. 2006: Best New Artist
2. 2006: Best R&B Album – Get Lifted
3. 2006: Best Male R&B Vocal Performance – "Ordinary People"
4. 2007: Best Male R&B Vocal Performance – "Heaven"
5. 2007: Best R&B Performance by a Duo or Group with Vocals – "Family Affair"
6. 2009: Best R&B Performance by a Duo or Group with Vocals – "Stay with Me (By the Sea)"
7. 2011: Best R&B Song – "Shine"
8. 2011: Best Traditional R&B Vocal Performance – "Hang on in There"
9. 2011: Best R&B Album – Wake Up!
10. 2016: Best Song Written for Visual Media – "Glory" (from Selma)
11. 2020: Best Rap/Sung Performance – "Higher"
12. 2021: Best R&B Album – Bigger Love
13. 2025: Best Arrangement, Instrumental or A Cappella – "Bridge Over Troubled Water"
- Tony Awards:
1. 2017: Best Revival of a Play – Jitney

=== Alan Menken ===
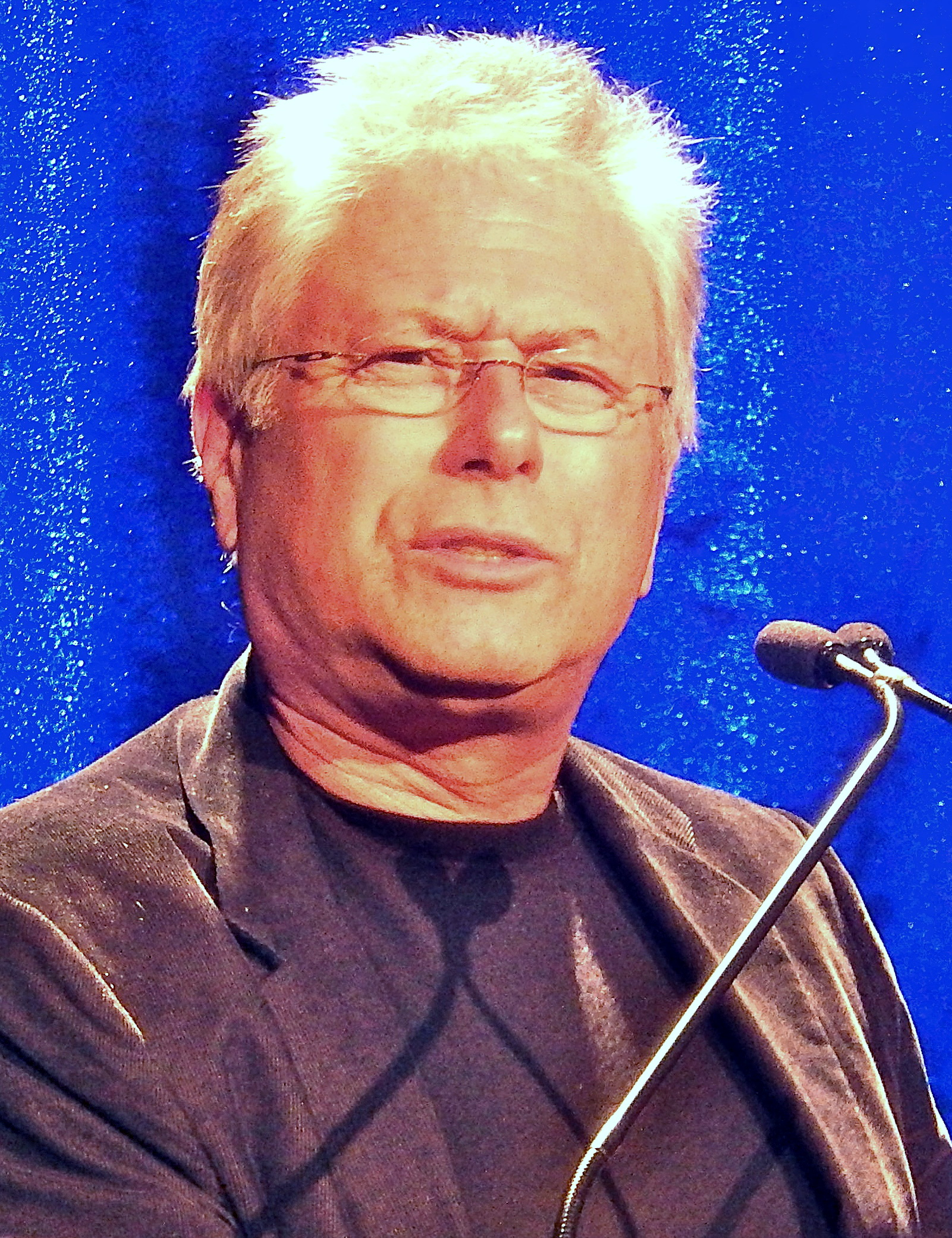
In 2020, Alan Menken became the sixteenth person to win all four awards.

American composer Alan Menken (born 1949) received his fourth distinct award in 2020. Between 1990 and 2020, Menken received a total of 21 competitive awards, tying with Scott Rudin for the most awards to individuals whose EGOT status was achieved solely by competitive wins. If Menken's special (non-competitive) Emmy Award is counted, he becomes the fully competing EGOT with the most overall awards. If EGOT status is recognized without regard to any qualifying awards being non-competitive, then Quincy Jones holds the record with his 30 fully competitive awards, including 29 Grammys. Alan Menken has the most Oscar wins (8) by an EGOT.

- Academy Awards:
1. 1990: Best Original Score – The Little Mermaid
2. 1990: Best Original Song – "Under the Sea" (from The Little Mermaid)
3. 1992: Best Original Score – Beauty and the Beast
4. 1992: Best Original Song – "Beauty and the Beast" (from Beauty and the Beast)
5. 1993: Best Original Score – Aladdin
6. 1993: Best Original Song – "A Whole New World" (from Aladdin)
7. 1996: Best Original Musical or Comedy Score – Pocahontas
8. 1996: Best Original Song – "Colors of the Wind" (from Pocahontas)
- Daytime Emmy Awards:
1. 2020: Outstanding Original Song in a Children's, Young Adult or Animated Program – "Waiting in the Wings" (from Rapunzel's Tangled Adventure — Episode: "Rapunzel and the Great Tree")
- Grammy Awards:
1. 1991: Best Recording for Children – The Little Mermaid: Original Walt Disney Records Soundtrack
2. 1991: Best Song Written Specifically for a Motion Picture or Television – "Under the Sea" (from The Little Mermaid)
3. 1993: Best Album for Children – Beauty and the Beast: Original Motion Picture Soundtrack
4. 1993: Best Instrumental Composition Written for a Motion Picture or for Television – Beauty and the Beast: Original Motion Picture Soundtrack
5. 1993: Best Song Written Specifically for a Motion Picture or Television – "Beauty and the Beast" (from Beauty and the Beast)
6. 1994: Song of the Year – "A Whole New World (Aladdin's Theme)" (from Aladdin)
7. 1994: Best Musical Album for Children – Aladdin: Original Motion Picture Soundtrack
8. 1994: Best Instrumental Composition Written for a Motion Picture or for Television – Aladdin: Original Motion Picture Soundtrack
9. 1994: Best Song Written Specifically for a Motion Picture or Television – "A Whole New World (Aladdin's Theme)" (from Aladdin)
10. 1996: Best Song Written Specifically for a Motion Picture or Television – "Colors of the Wind" (from Pocahontas)
11. 2012: Best Song Written for Visual Media – "I See the Light" (from Tangled)
- Tony Awards:
1. 2012: Best Original Score – Newsies
- Special Awards:
1. 1990: Primetime Emmy Award for Outstanding Contribution to the success of the academy's anti-drug special for children – "Wonderful Ways to Say No" from the TV special Cartoon All-Stars to the Rescue

=== Jennifer Hudson ===
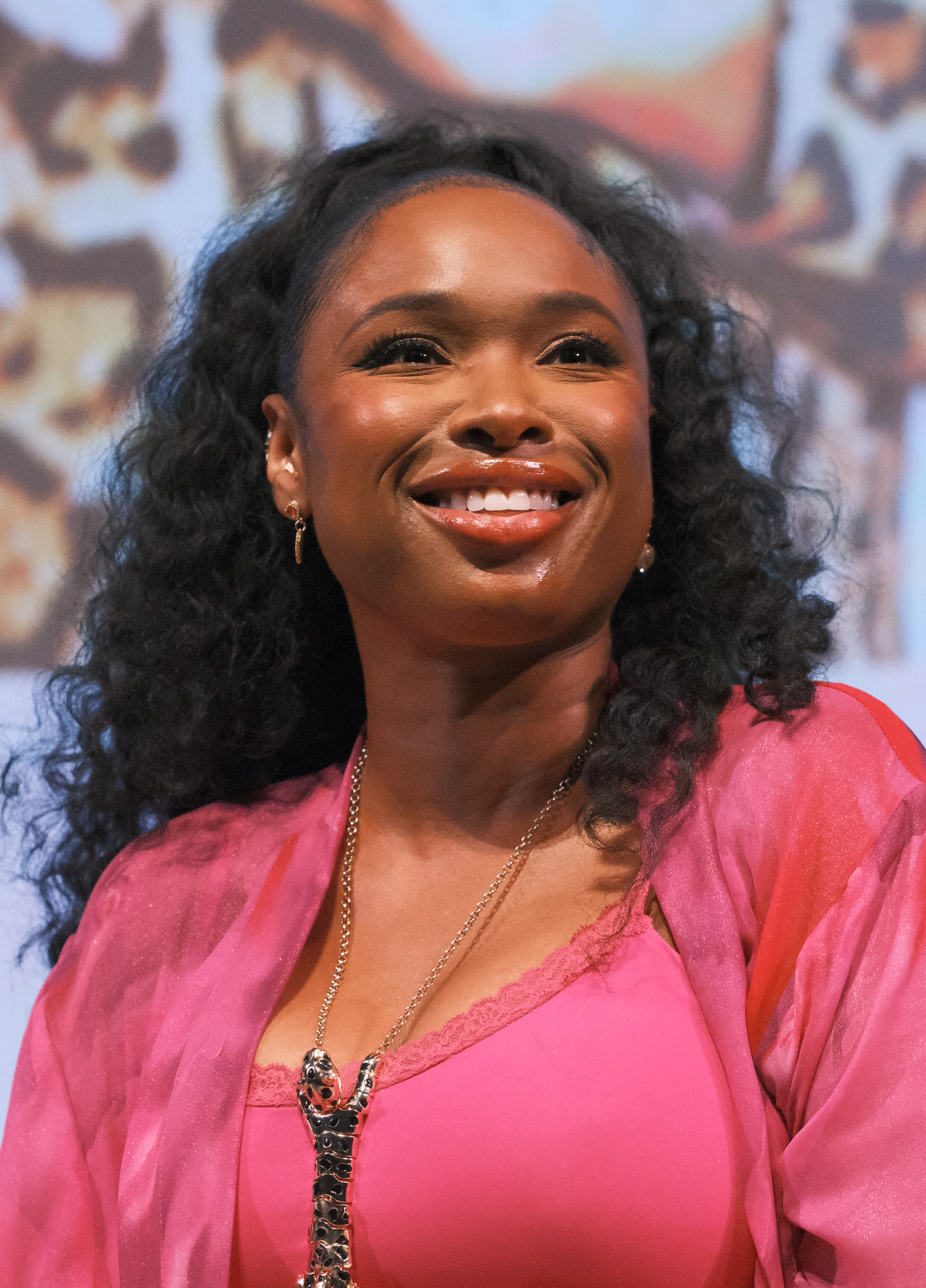
In 2022, Jennifer Hudson became the seventeenth person to win all four awards.

American singer, actress, talk show host, and producer Jennifer Hudson (born 1981) received her fourth distinct award in 2022. Hudson received a total of five competitive awards between 2007 and 2022, making her the youngest competitive female EGOT to date.

- Academy Awards:
1. 2007: Best Actress in a Supporting Role – Dreamgirls
- Daytime Emmy Awards:
1. 2021: Outstanding Interactive Media for a Daytime Program – Baba Yaga
- Grammy Awards:
1. 2009: Best R&B Album – Jennifer Hudson
2. 2017: Best Musical Theater Album – The Color Purple
- Tony Awards:
1. 2022: Best Musical – A Strange Loop

=== Viola Davis ===
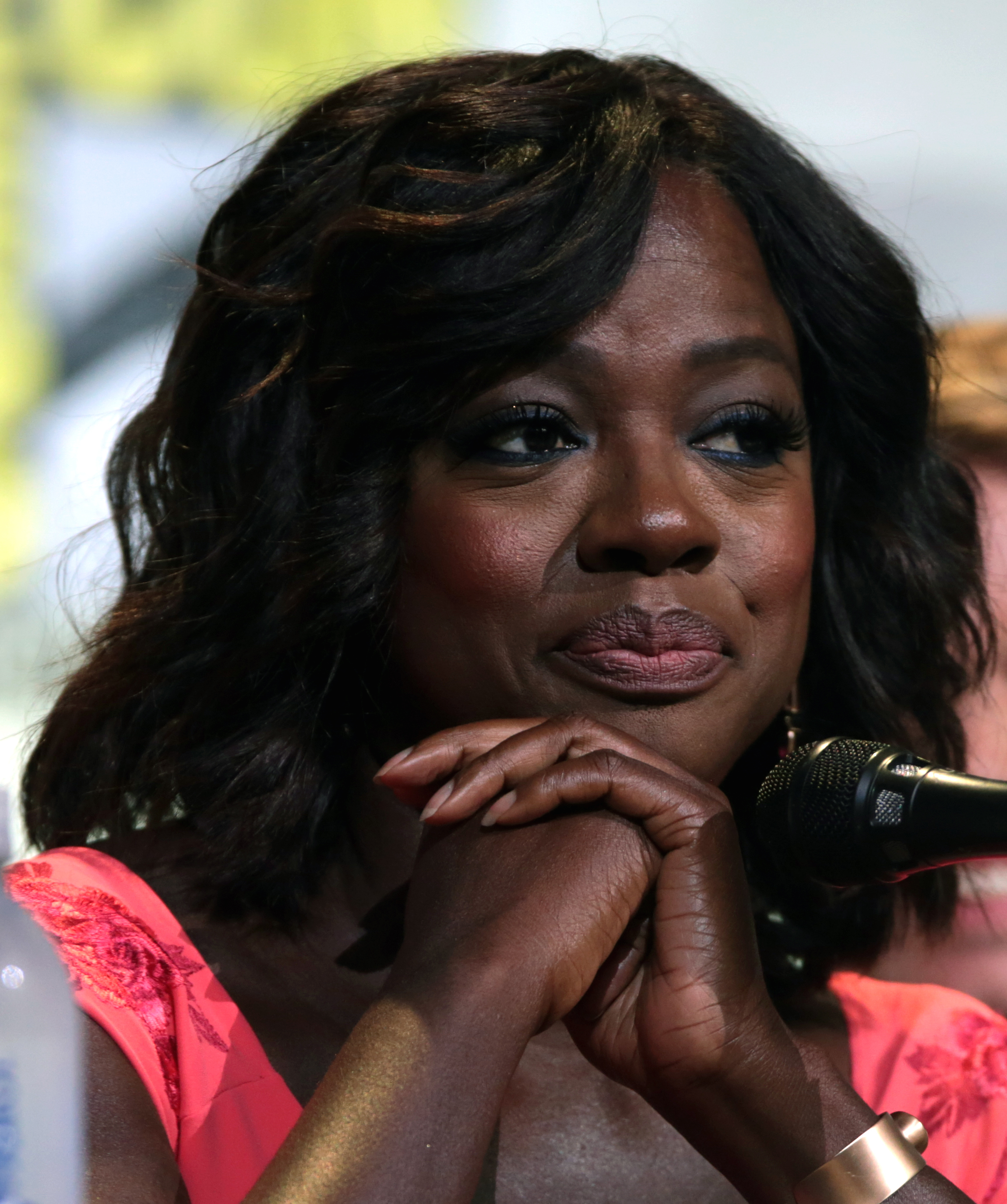
In 2023, Viola Davis became the eighteenth person to win all four awards.

American actress and producer Viola Davis (born 1965) received her fourth distinct award in 2023. Between 2001 and 2023, Davis received a total of five competitive awards becoming the eighteenth person to competitively win each of the four awards. Davis acknowledged her new EGOT status while accepting her 2023 Grammy. Davis is also the third EGOT recipient and the first African American actress to win the Triple Crown of Acting.

- Academy Awards:
1. 2017: Best Actress in a Supporting Role – Fences
- Primetime Emmy Awards:
1. 2015: Outstanding Lead Actress in a Drama Series – How to Get Away with Murder
- Grammy Awards:
1. 2023: Best Audio Book, Narration & Storytelling Recording – Finding Me
- Tony Awards
1. 2001: Best Featured Actress in a Play – King Hedley II
2. 2010: Best Leading Actress in a Play – Fences

=== Elton John ===
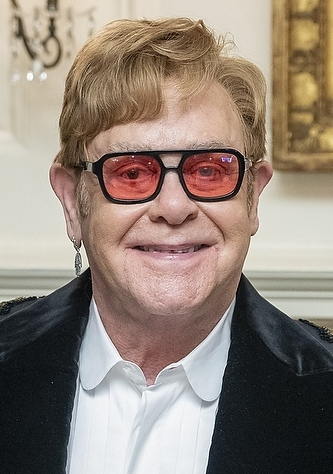
In 2024, Elton John became the nineteenth person to win all four awards.

English singer, composer, pianist, and producer Elton John (born 1947) received his fourth distinct award in 2024. Between 1987 and 2024, John received a total of nine competitive awards becoming the nineteenth person to competitively win each of the four awards.

- Academy Awards:
1. 1995: Best Original Song – "Can You Feel the Love Tonight" (from The Lion King)
2. 2020: Best Original Song – "(I'm Gonna) Love Me Again" (from Rocketman)
- Primetime Emmy Awards:
1. 2024: Outstanding Variety Special (Live) – Elton John: Farewell from Dodger Stadium
- Grammy Awards:
1. 1987: Best Pop Performance by a Duo or Group with Vocal – "That's What Friends Are For"
2. 1992: Best Instrumental Composition – "Basque"
3. 1995: Best Male Pop Vocal Performance – "Can You Feel the Love Tonight"
4. 1998: Best Male Pop Vocal Performance – "Candle in the Wind 1997"
5. 2001: Best Musical Show Album – Elton John and Tim Rice's Aida
- Tony Awards:
1. 2000: Best Original Score – Aida
- Special Awards:
1. 1999: Grammy Legend Award

=== Benj Pasek ===
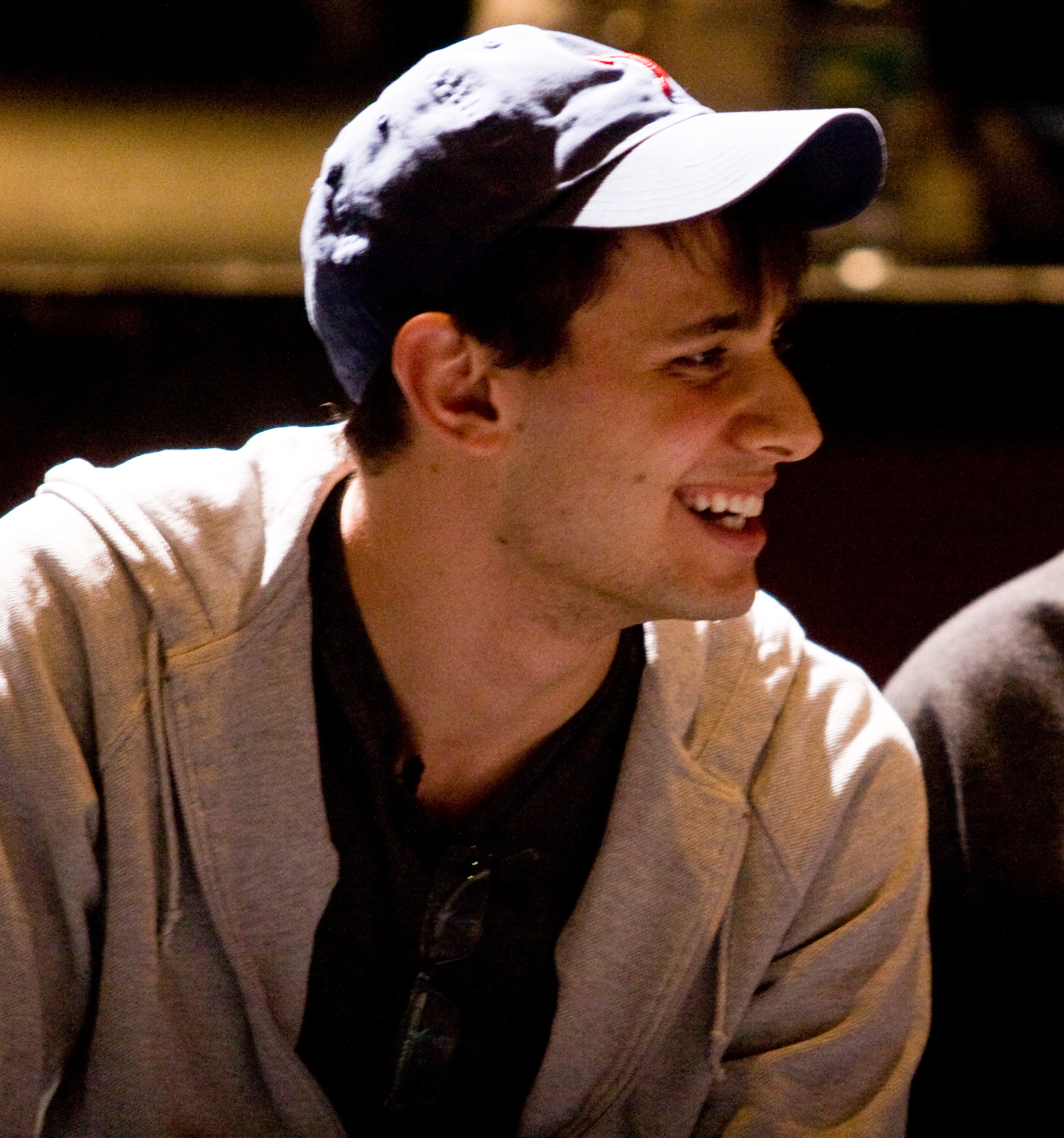
In 2024, Benj Pasek became the twentieth person to win all four awards, and, along with Justin Paul, the fastest to achieve this status.

American composer, lyricist, and producer Benj Pasek (born 1985) received his fourth distinct award in 2024. Pasek and Justin Paul set a new record for achieving EGOT status in the fastest time by winning all four awards within 7 years and 7 months. Between 2017 and 2025, Pasek received a total of seven competitive awards becoming the twentieth person to competitively win each of the four awards. Pasek shares all seven of his competitive award wins with his writing partner and fellow EGOT-recipient Justin Paul.

- Academy Awards:
1. 2017: Best Original Song – "City of Stars" (from La La Land)
- Primetime Emmy Awards:
1. 2024: Outstanding Original Music and Lyrics – "Which of the Pickwick Triplets Did It?" (from Only Murders in the Building — Episode: "Sitzprobe")
- Children's and Family Emmy Awards:
1. 2025: Outstanding Original Song for a Preschool Program – "That's Why We Love Nature" (from Sesame Street — Episode: "Tamir's Water Works")
- Grammy Awards:
1. 2018: Best Musical Theater Album – Dear Evan Hansen
2. 2019: Best Compilation Soundtrack for Visual Media – The Greatest Showman
- Tony Awards:
1. 2017: Best Original Score – Dear Evan Hansen
2. 2022: Best Musical – A Strange Loop

=== Justin Paul ===
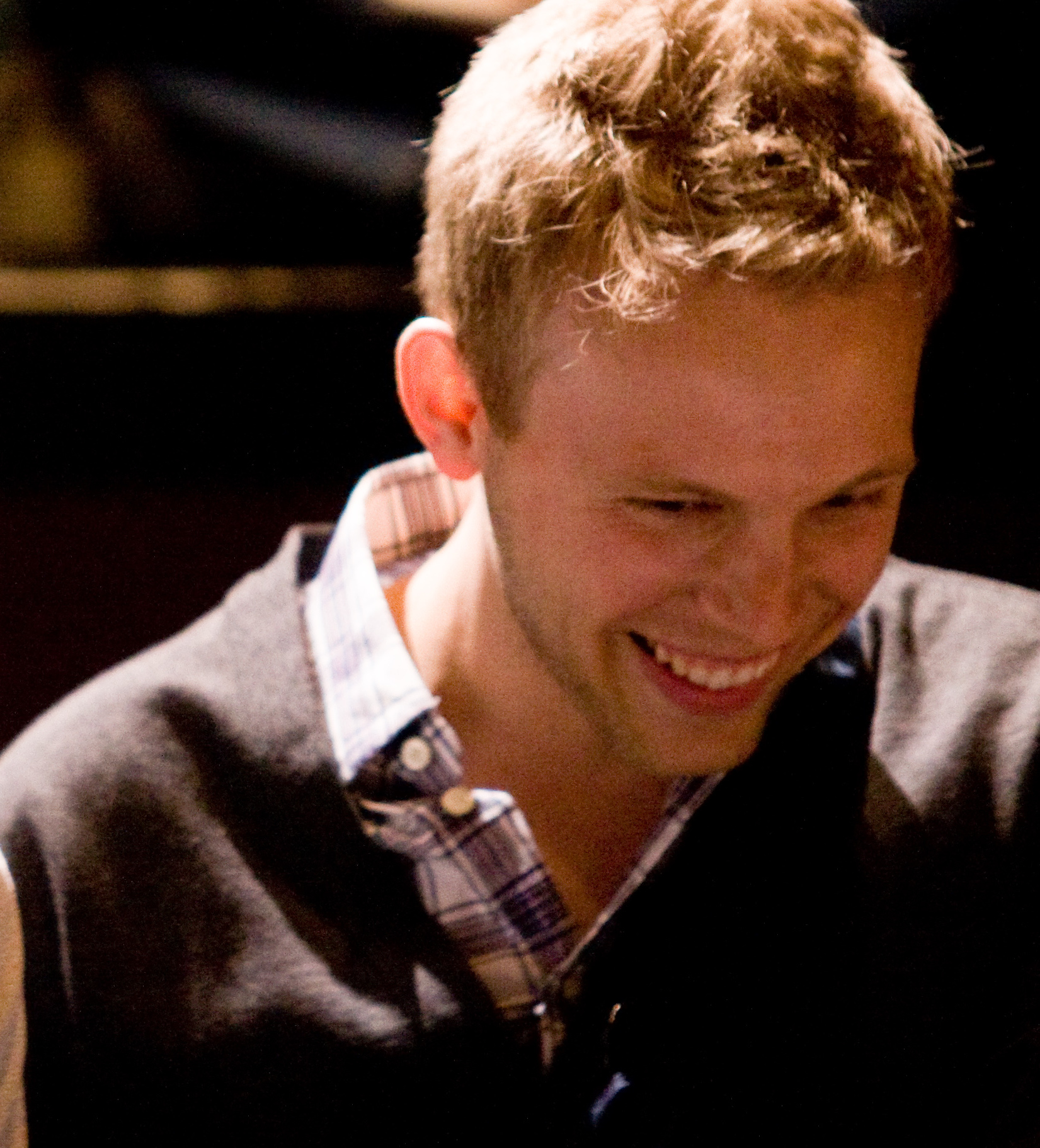
In 2024, Justin Paul became the twenty-first person to win all four awards, and, along with Benj Pasek, the fastest to achieve this status.

American composer, lyricist, and producer Justin Paul (born 1985) received his fourth distinct award in 2024. Paul and Benj Pasek set a new record for achieving EGOT status in the fastest time by winning all four awards within 7 years and 7 months. Between 2017 and 2025, Paul received a total of seven competitive awards becoming the twenty-first person to competitively win each of the four awards. Paul shares all seven of his competitive award wins with his writing partner and fellow EGOT-recipient Benj Pasek.

- Academy Awards:
1. 2017: Best Original Song – "City of Stars" (from La La Land)
- Primetime Emmy Awards:
1. 2024: Outstanding Original Music and Lyrics – "Which of the Pickwick Triplets Did It?" (from Only Murders in the Building — Episode: "Sitzprobe")
- Children's and Family Emmy Awards:
1. 2025: Outstanding Original Song for a Preschool Program – "That's Why We Love Nature" (from Sesame Street — Episode: "Tamir's Water Works")
- Grammy Awards:
1. 2018: Best Musical Theater Album – Dear Evan Hansen
2. 2019: Best Compilation Soundtrack for Visual Media – The Greatest Showman
- Tony Awards:
1. 2017: Best Original Score – Dear Evan Hansen
2. 2022: Best Musical – A Strange Loop

=== Steven Spielberg ===
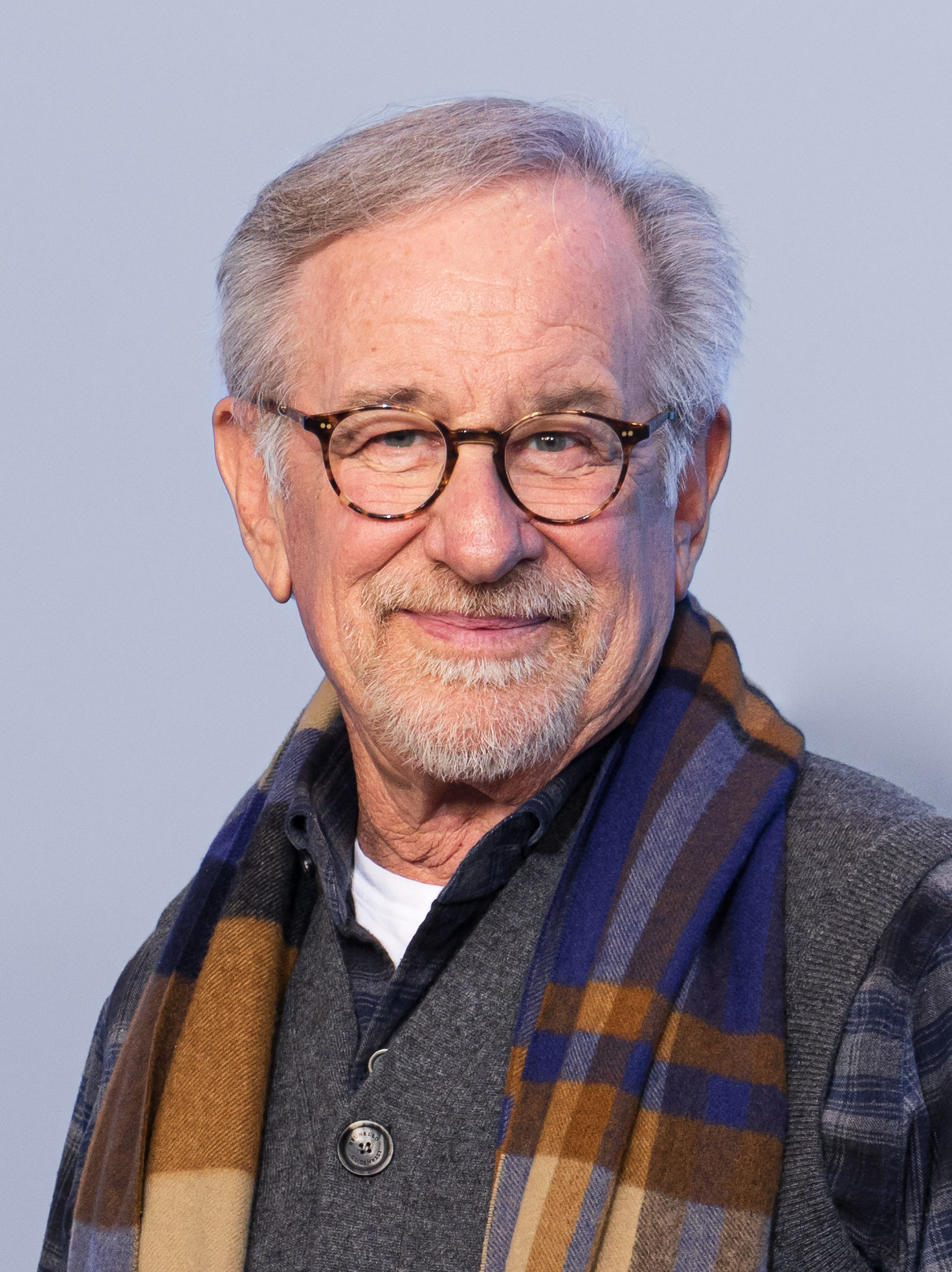
In 2026, Steven Spielberg became the twenty-second person to win all four awards.

American director and producer Steven Spielberg (born 1946) received his fourth distinct award in 2026. Between 1991 and 2026, Spielberg has won 3 Academy Awards, 13 competitive Emmy awards, a Grammy, and a Tony. Spielberg received the Tony in 2022 for the musical A Strange Loop, for which Spielberg is included in the award listing as "et al" due to the large number of people involved in the production, and thus received the award despite not being explicitly named. Additionally, Spielberg has received the Irving G. Thalberg Memorial Award and the International Emmy Founders Award.

- Academy Awards:
1. 1994: Best Picture – Schindler's List
2. 1994: Best Director – Schindler's List
3. 1999: Best Director – Saving Private Ryan
- Primetime Emmy Awards:
1. 1996: Outstanding Animated Program (For Programming One Hour or Less) – A Pinky and the Brain Christmas
2. 2002: Outstanding Miniseries – Band of Brothers
3. 2003: Outstanding Miniseries – Taken
4. 2010: Outstanding Miniseries – The Pacific
- Daytime Emmy Awards:
1. 1991: Outstanding Animated Program – Tiny Toon Adventures
2. 1993: Outstanding Animated Children's Program – Tiny Toon Adventures
3. 1996: Outstanding Children's Animated Program – Animaniacs
4. 1997: Outstanding Children's Animated Program – Animaniacs
5. 1997: Outstanding Special Class Animated Program – Freakazoid!
6. 1999: Outstanding Special Class Animated Program – Pinky and the Brain
7. 2000: Outstanding Children's Animated Program – Pinky, Elmyra & the Brain
- Sports Emmy Awards:
1. 2025: Outstanding Open/Tease – Games of the XXXIII Olympiad: "Land of Stories"
2. 2025: The Dick Schaap Outstanding Writing Award – Short Form – Games of the XXXIII Olympiad: "Land of Stories"
- Grammy Awards:
1. 2026: Best Music Film – Music by John Williams
- Tony Awards:
1. 2022: Best Musical – A Strange Loop
- Special Awards:
1. 1987: Irving G. Thalberg Memorial Award
2. 2006: International Emmy Founders Award

== Non-competitive EGOT awardees ==
Six additional artists have received all four awards, though one was bestowed for an honorary or similar non-competitive distinction: Barbra Streisand does not have a competitive Tony; Liza Minnelli does not have a competitive Grammy; and Harry Belafonte, James Earl Jones, Quincy Jones, and Frank Marshall are all without a competitive Oscar.

=== Barbra Streisand ===
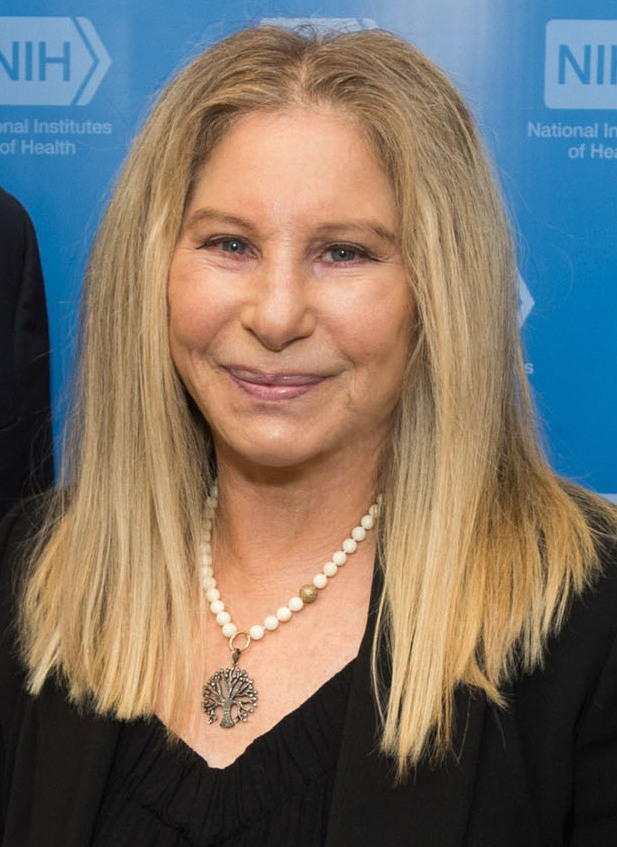
Barbra Streisand's Tony is a non-competitive award.

American singer, actress, and director Barbra Streisand (born 1942) received her fourth distinct award in 1970. Between 1963 and 2001, Streisand received a total of 18 awards, three of which were non-competitive. Having obtained her fourth award with a special Tony at age 28, she is the youngest special EGOT winner. With just six years elapsing between her first award, a 1964 Grammy, and her 1970 Tony, Streisand held the record for completing the fastest special EGOT until 2023 when Frank Marshall did so within four years.

Streisand is the only EGOT to win an Oscar in both a music and an acting category. She is the only winner to have three competitive awards for debut performances: first studio album, first feature film, and first television special. Additional distinctions include the Peabody Award, the AFI Life Achievement Award, the Kennedy Center Honor, the Cecil B. DeMille Award, the National Medal of Arts, the American Society of Cinematographers Board of Governors Award, and the Presidential Medal of Freedom.

- Academy Awards:
1. 1969: Best Actress in a Leading Role – Funny Girl
2. 1977: Best Original Song – "Evergreen (Love Theme from A Star Is Born)" (from A Star Is Born)
- Primetime Emmy Awards:
1. 1965: Outstanding Individual Achievements in Entertainment – Actors and Performers – My Name is Barbra
2. 1995: Outstanding Individual Performance in a Variety or Music Program – Barbra Streisand: The Concert
3. 1995: Outstanding Variety, Music or Comedy Special – Barbra Streisand: The Concert
4. 2001: Outstanding Individual Performance in a Variety or Music Program – Timeless: Live in Concert
- Daytime Emmy Awards:
1. 2001: Outstanding Special Class Special – Reel Models: The First Women of Film
- Grammy Awards:
1. 1964: Album of the Year (Other Than Classical) – The Barbra Streisand Album
2. 1964: Best Vocal Performance, Female – The Barbra Streisand Album
3. 1965: Best Vocal Performance, Female – "People"
4. 1966: Best Vocal Performance, Female – My Name Is Barbra
5. 1978: Song of the Year – "Evergreen (Love Theme from A Star Is Born)"
6. 1978: Best Pop Vocal Performance, Female – "Evergreen (Love Theme from A Star Is Born)"
7. 1981: Best Pop Performance by a Duo or Group with Vocal – "Guilty" (with Barry Gibb)
8. 1987: Best Pop Vocal Performance, Female – The Broadway Album
9. 1992: Grammy Legend Award (non-competitive)
10. 1995: Grammy Lifetime Achievement Award (non-competitive)
- Tony Awards:
1. 1970: Special Tony Award: Star of the Decade (non-competitive)

=== Liza Minnelli ===
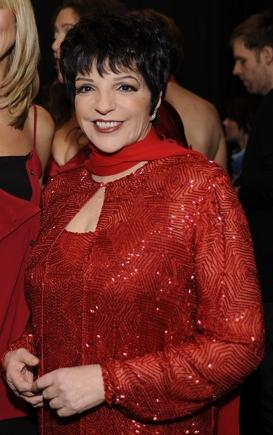
Liza Minnelli's Grammy is a non-competitive award.

American actress, singer, dancer, and choreographer Liza Minnelli (born 1946) received her fourth distinct award in 1990. Between 1965 and 2009, Minnelli received a total of seven awards, two of which were special.

- Academy Awards:
1. 1973: Best Actress in a Leading Role – Cabaret
- Primetime Emmy Awards:
1. 1973: Outstanding Single Program − Variety and Popular Music – Liza with a 'Z'. A Concert for Television
- Grammy Awards:
1. 1990: Grammy Legend Award (non-competitive)
- Tony Awards:
1. 1965: Best Leading Actress in a Musical – Flora the Red Menace
2. 1974: Special Tony Award for "adding luster to the Broadway season" (non-competitive)
3. 1978: Best Leading Actress in a Musical – The Act
4. 2009: Best Special Theatrical Event – Liza's at The Palace...!

=== James Earl Jones ===
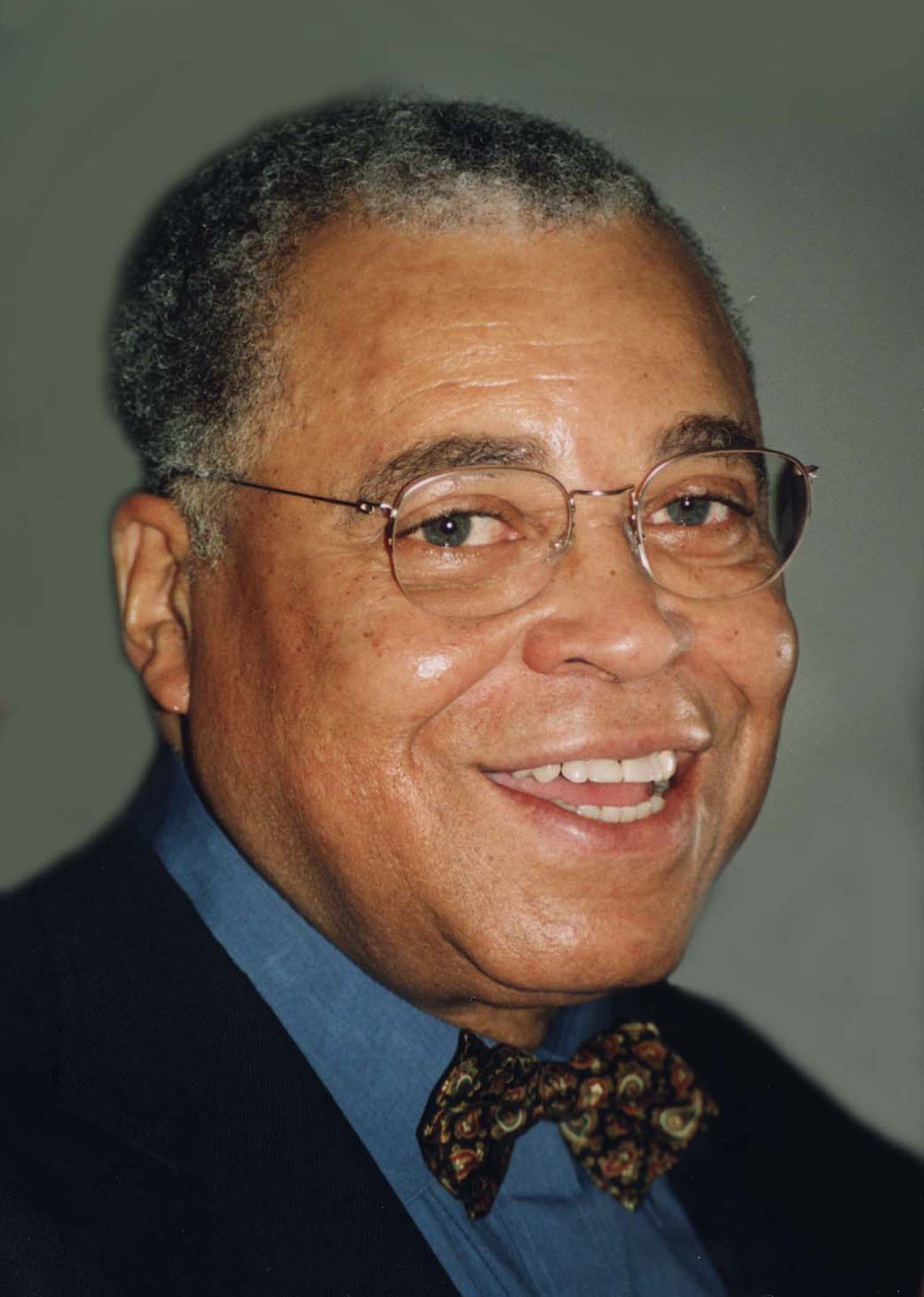
James Earl Jones's Oscar is a non-competitive award.

American actor James Earl Jones (1931–2024) received his fourth distinct award in 2011. Between 1969 and 2017, Jones received a total of eight awards, two of which were special.

- Academy Awards:
1. 2011: Academy Honorary Award (non-competitive)
- Primetime Emmy Awards:
1. 1991: Outstanding Lead Actor in a Drama Series – Gabriel's Fire
2. 1991: Outstanding Supporting Actor in a Miniseries or a Special – Heat Wave
- Daytime Emmy Awards:
1. 2000: Outstanding Performer − Children's Special – Summer's End
- Grammy Awards:
1. 1977: Best Spoken Word Recording – Great American Documents
- Tony Awards:
1. 1969: Best Leading Actor in a Play – The Great White Hope
2. 1987: Best Leading Actor in a Play – Fences
3. 2017: Special Tony Award for Lifetime Achievement in the Theatre (non-competitive)

=== Harry Belafonte ===
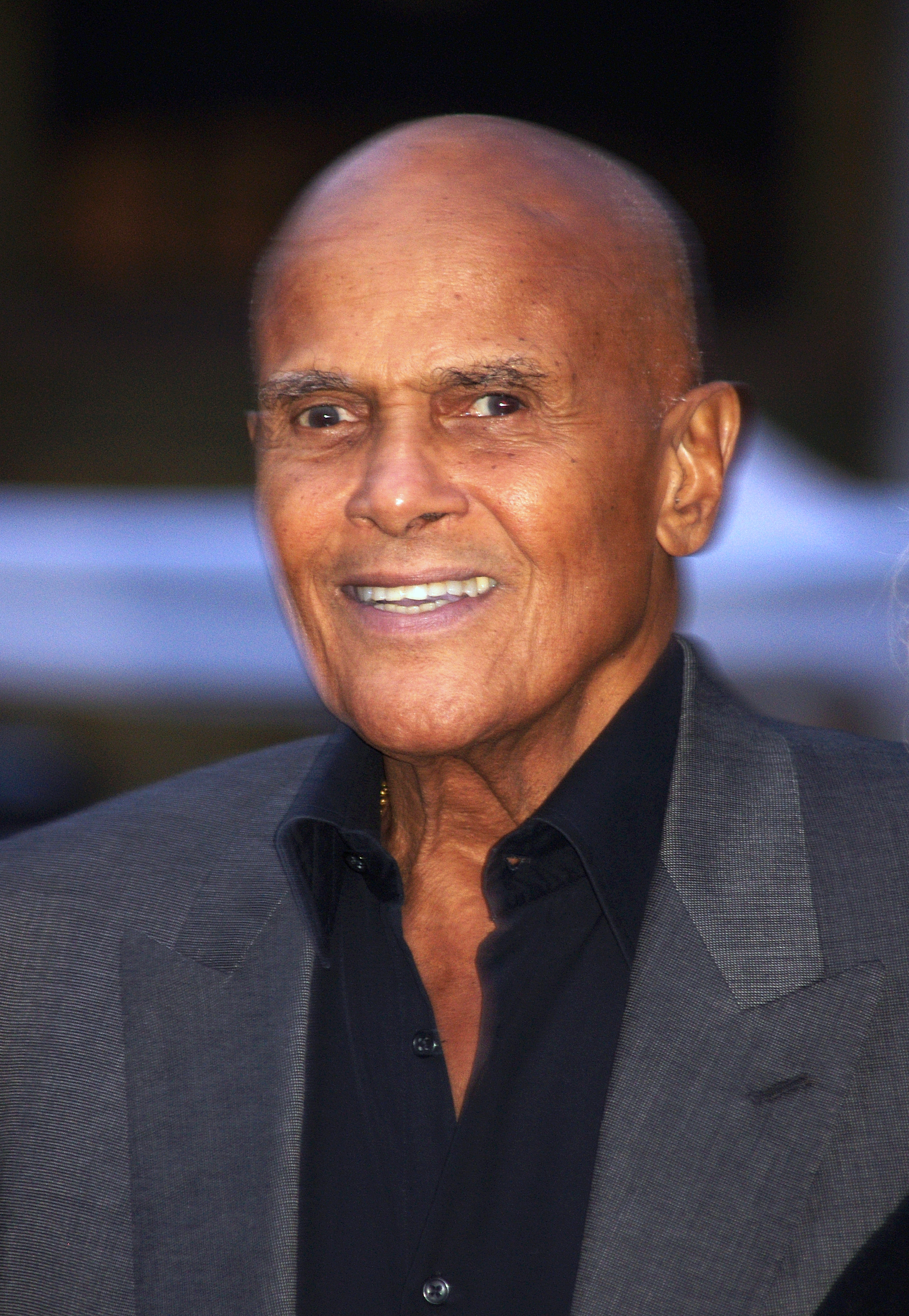
Harry Belafonte's Oscar is a non-competitive award.

American singer, activist, and actor Harry Belafonte (1927–2023) received his fourth distinct award in 2014. Between 1954 and 2014, Belafonte received a total of six awards, including a Grammy Hall of Fame Award and the Jean Hersholt Humanitarian Award (special awards).

- Academy Awards:
1. 2014: Jean Hersholt Humanitarian Award (non-competitive)
- Primetime Emmy Awards:
1. 1960: Outstanding Individual Performance in a Variety or Music Program – Tonight with Belafonte – The Revlon Revue
- Grammy Awards:
1. 1961: Best Performance – Folk – Swing Dat Hammer
2. 1966: Best Folk Performance – An Evening with Belafonte/Makeba
3. 2000: Grammy Hall of Fame Award (non-competitive)
- Tony Awards:
1. 1954: Distinguished Supporting or Featured Musical Actor – John Murray Anderson's Almanac

=== Quincy Jones ===
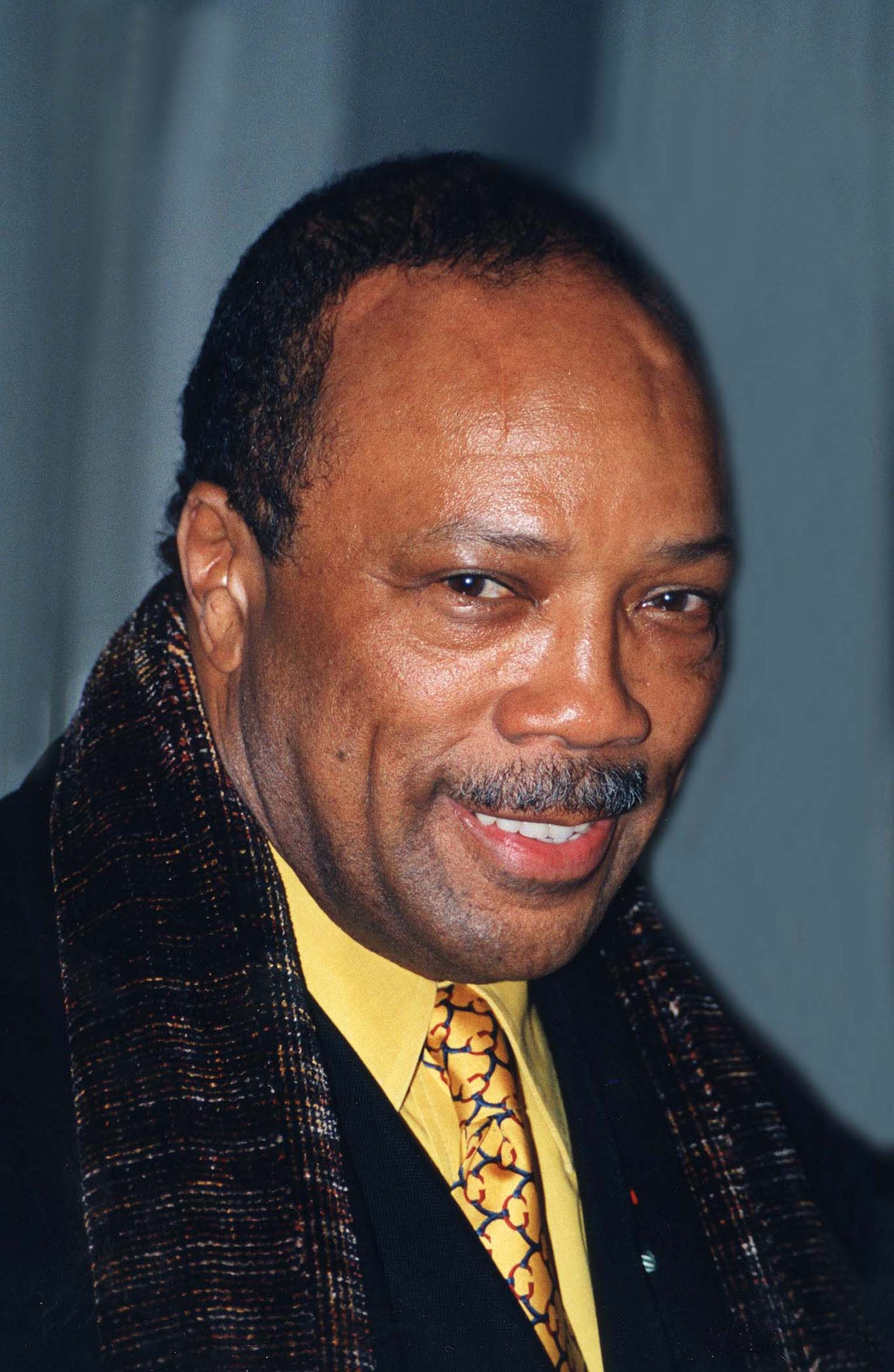
Quincy Jones's Oscars are non-competitive awards.

American record producer, musician, songwriter, composer, arranger, and film and television producer Quincy Jones (1933–2024) received his fourth distinct award in 2016. Between 1964 and 2024, Jones received a total of 33 awards—the highest number so far of any EGOT winner. He competed for and won 28 Grammys, one Tony, and one Emmy, also receiving a special Grammy Legend Award and two special Oscars (the Jean Hersholt Humanitarian Award and the Academy Honorary Award). Quincy's final qualifying award was a fully competitive 2016 Tony for The Color Purple.

- Academy Awards:
1. 1994: Jean Hersholt Humanitarian Award (non-competitive)
2. 2024: Academy Honorary Award (non-competitive)
- Primetime Emmy Awards:
1. 1977: Outstanding Achievement in Music Composition for a Series (Dramatic Underscore) – Roots: Part 1
- Grammy Awards:
1. 1964: Best Instrumental Arrangement – "I Can't Stop Loving You"
2. 1970: Best Instrumental Jazz Performance – Large Group or Soloist with Large Group – Walking in Space
3. 1972: Best Pop Instrumental Performance – Smackwater Jack
4. 1974: Best Instrumental Arrangement – "Summer in the City"
5. 1979: Best Instrumental Arrangement – "The Wiz Main Title (Overture, Part One)"
6. 1981: Best Instrumental Arrangement – "Dinorah, Dinorah"
7. 1982: Producer of the Year
8. 1982: Best R&B Performance by a Duo or Group with Vocal – "The Dude"
9. 1982: Best Instrumental Arrangement Accompanying Vocal(s) – "Ai No Corrida" (with Jerry Hey)
10. 1982: Best Arrangement on an Instrumental Recording – "Velas"
11. 1982: Best Cast Show Album – Lena Horne: The Lady and Her Music
12. 1984: Album of the Year – Thriller
13. 1984: Record of the Year – "Beat It"
14. 1984: Best Recording for Children – E.T. the Extra-Terrestrial
15. 1984: Producer of the Year (Non-Classical)
16. 1985: Best Arrangement on an Instrumental – "Grace (Gymnastics Theme)" (with Jeremy Lubbock)
17. 1986: Record of the Year – "We Are the World"
18. 1986: Best Pop Performance by a Duo or Group with Vocals – "We Are the World"
19. 1986: Best Music Video, Short Form – "We Are the World – The Video Event"
20. 1991: Album of the Year – Back on the Block
21. 1991: Best Jazz Fusion Performance – "Birdland"
22. 1991: Best Rap Performance by a Duo or Group – "Back on the Block"
23. 1991: Best Instrumental Arrangement Accompanying Vocal(s) – "The Places You Find Love"
24. 1991: Best Arrangement on an Instrumental – "Birdland"
25. 1991: Producer of the Year (Non-Classical)
26. 1992: Grammy Legend Award (non-competitive)
27. 1994: Best Large Jazz Ensemble Performance – Miles & Quincy Live at Montreux
28. 2002: Best Spoken Word Album – Q: The Autobiography of Quincy Jones
29. 2019: Best Music Film – Quincy
- Tony Awards:
1. 2016: Best Revival of a Musical – The Color Purple

=== Frank Marshall ===
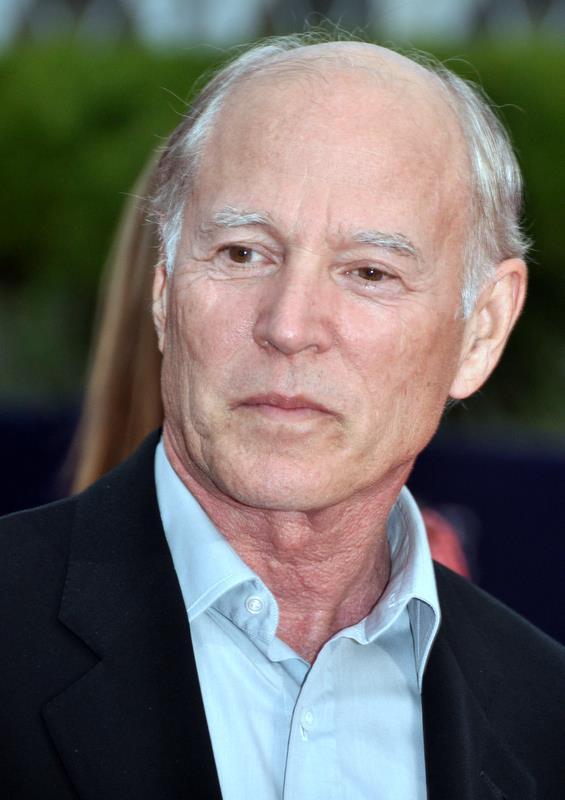
Frank Marshall's Oscar is a non-competitive award.

American film producer and director Frank Marshall (born 1946) received his fourth distinct award in 2023. Between 2019 and 2026, Marshall received a total of five awards. Together with Steven Spielberg, he is one of two EGOT winners to have won a Sports Emmy and the Irving G. Thalberg Memorial Award. With just four years elapsing between his first award (a 2019 honorary Oscar), a long format TV sports documentary, and competitive Grammy and Tony music awards, Marshall completed his EGOT collection in the shortest time of all persons to have reached this status.

- Academy Awards:
1. 2019: Irving G. Thalberg Memorial Award (non-competitive)
- Sports Emmy Awards:
1. 2023: Outstanding Long Documentary – The Redeem Team
- Grammy Awards:
1. 2023: Best Music Film – Jazz Fest: A New Orleans Story
2. 2026: Best Music Film – Music by John Williams
- Tony Awards:
1. 2022: Best Musical – A Strange Loop

== Three competitive awards ==
The following people have each won three out of the four major entertainment awards in competitive categories. As of July 2025, 75 living people are one award away from achieving (competitive) EGOT status.

=== Without an Emmy ===
1. Henry Fonda^{†, ◊}
2. Oscar Hammerstein II^{†, PP}
3. Alan Jay Lerner^{†}
4. Frank Loesser^{†, PP}
5. Stephen Sondheim^{†, PP}
6. Jule Styne^{†}

=== Without a Grammy ===
1. Jack Albertson^{†, TC}
2. Anne Bancroft^{†, TC}
3. Ingrid Bergman^{†, TC}
4. Shirley Booth^{†, TC}
5. Ralph Burns^{†, ◊}
6. Ellen Burstyn^{◊, TC}
7. Melvyn Douglas^{†, TC}
8. Bob Fosse^{†}
9. Jeremy Irons^{◊, TC}
10. Glenda Jackson^{†, TC}
11. Jessica Lange^{TC}
12. Frances McDormand^{TC}
13. Liza Minnelli^{◊, NCA}
14. Helen Mirren^{TC}
15. Thomas Mitchell^{†, TC}
16. Al Pacino^{◊, TC}
17. Christopher Plummer^{†, ◊, TC}
18. Vanessa Redgrave^{◊, TC}
19. Jason Robards^{†, ◊, TC}
20. Geoffrey Rush^{TC}
21. Paul Scofield^{†, ◊, TC}
22. Maggie Smith^{†, TC}
23. Maureen Stapleton^{†, ◊, TC}
24. Jessica Tandy^{†, TC}
25. Paul Tazewell (Note: Paul Tazewell is one of only two costume/set designers to win three different awards.)
26. Tony Walton^{†} (Note: Tony Walton is one of only two costume/set designers to win three different awards.)

=== Without an Oscar ===
1. Harry Belafonte^{†, NCA}
2. Leonard Bernstein^{†, ◊}
3. Jerry Bock^{†, PP}
4. Martin Charnin^{†, PA}
5. Cy Coleman^{†, ◊}
6. André De Shields
7. Daveed Diggs
8. Fred Ebb^{†, ◊}
9. Cynthia Erivo^{◊}
10. Anne Garefino^{PA}
11. George Grizzard^{†}
12. Julie Harris^{†, ◊}
13. Hugh Jackman^{◊}
14. Billy Joel (Note: Billy Joel's only Emmy awards are New York Emmy Awards, a regional faction honoring achievements in the New York metropolitan area.)
15. James Earl Jones^{†, ◊, NCA}
16. Quincy Jones^{†, ◊, NCA}
17. Rachel Bay Jones
18. John Kander^{◊}
19. Tom Kitt^{PP}
20. Alex Lacamoire
21. Stan Lathan^{PA}
22. Cyndi Lauper
23. Katrina Lenk
24. Frank Marshall^{◊, NCA}
25. John Mauceri
26. Audra McDonald
27. Bette Midler^{◊}
28. Lin-Manuel Miranda^{◊, PP}
29. Cynthia Nixon
30. Trey Parker^{◊, PA} (Note: Trey Parker also placed second in the narrative/dramatic division of 1993's Student Academy Awards for his college short American History.)
31. Ben Platt
32. Billy Porter
33. Scott Sanders
34. Marc Shaiman^{◊}
35. Bill Sherman
36. Ari'el Stachel
37. Matt Stone^{PA}
38. Charles Strouse^{†, PA}
39. Lily Tomlin^{◊, PA}
40. Dick Van Dyke
41. James Whitmore^{†, ◊}
42. Scott Wittman^{◊}
43. David Yazbek

=== Without a Tony ===
1. John Addison^{†}
2. Adele
3. Kristen Anderson-Lopez^{◊}
4. Julie Andrews^{◊} (Note: In 1996, Julie Andrews declined a Tony Award nomination for her role in Victor/Victoria in protest that the production received no other nominations, despite being seen as the favorite. She was also Tony-nominated for My Fair Lady and Camelot.)
5. Burt Bacharach^{†, ◊}
6. Jon Batiste
7. Alan Bergman^{†}
8. Marilyn Bergman^{†}
9. Jon Blair
10. George Burns^{†}
11. Cher
12. Common
13. Eminem
14. Rob Epstein^{PA}
15. James Gay-Rees
16. Michael Giacchino
17. Alex Gibney
18. Alex Gibson
19. Ludwig Göransson
20. Brian Grazer^{◊}
21. Hildur Guðnadóttir
22. H.E.R.
23. Ron Howard
24. Lady Gaga
25. Paul McCartney
26. James Moll^{PA}
27. Shawn Murphy
28. Morgan Neville
29. Randy Newman
30. Sid Ramin^{†}
31. Trent Reznor
32. Caitrin Rogers
33. Atticus Ross
34. Martin Scorsese
35. Ringo Starr
36. Barbra Streisand^{◊, PA, NCA}
37. Peter Ustinov^{†, ◊}
38. John Williams
39. Robin Williams^{†}
40. Kate Winslet

Notes

† – Person is deceased.
◊ – Person has been nominated at least once for a competitive category of the missing award but has failed to win.
NCA – Person won a non-competitive award in this category (see section above).
PA – Person has won the Peabody Award
PP – Person has won the Pulitzer Prize
TC – Person has joined EGOT winners Helen Hayes, Rita Moreno, and Viola Davis as winners of the Triple Crown of Acting, with singular (non-group/ensemble/company) acting wins in each of the Emmy, Oscar and Tony awards.

== Three, including non-competitive awards ==
In addition to the above winners, the following people have each won three out of the four major entertainment awards in either competitive categories or non-competitive special and honorary categories. As of June 2026, 14 additional living individuals are one award away from achieving EGOT status (including non-competitive awards).

1. Howard Ashman^{†, ◊} won two competitive Academy Awards, five competitive Grammy Awards, and a Special Emmy Award.
2. Fred Astaire^{†} won three competitive Emmy Awards, a Special Academy Award, and a Grammy Lifetime Achievement Award.
3. Robert Russell Bennett^{†} won a competitive Academy Award, a competitive Emmy Award, and two Special Tony Awards.
4. Irving Berlin^{†} won a competitive Academy Award, a competitive Tony Award, and a Grammy Lifetime Achievement Award.
5. Barbara Broccoli won a competitive Emmy Award, two competitive Tony Awards, and the Irving G. Thalberg Memorial Award, a non-competitive Academy Award.
6. Carol Burnett won seven competitive Emmy Awards, one competitive Grammy Award, and a Special Tony Award.
7. David Byrne^{◊} won an Academy Award, a competitive Grammy Award, and a Special Tony Award.
8. Glenn Close^{◊} won the Academy Honorary Award, three competitive Emmy Awards, and three competitive Tony Awards.
9. Walt Disney^{†} won 22 competitive Academy Awards, four non-competitive Academy Awards, seven competitive Emmy Awards, and a Grammy Trustees Award.
10. Ray Dolby^{†} won an Academy Scientific and Technical Award, two Technology & Engineering Emmy Awards, and a Special Merit/Technical Grammy Award.
11. Michael J. Fox won five competitive Emmy Awards, a competitive Grammy Award, and the Jean Hersholt Humanitarian Award, a non-competitive Academy Award.
12. Judy Garland^{†, ◊} won an Academy Juvenile Award, two competitive Grammy Awards, and a Special Tony Award.
13. Eileen Heckart^{†} won a competitive Academy Award, a competitive Emmy Award, and a Special Tony Award.
14. Danny Kaye^{†} won a competitive Emmy Award, a Special Tony Award, and the Jean Hersholt Humanitarian Award, a non-competitive Academy Award.
15. Kathleen Kennedy won a competitive Emmy Award, a competitive Grammy Award, and the Irving G. Thalberg Memorial Award, a non-competitive Academy Award.
16. Barry Manilow won two competitive Emmy Awards, a competitive Grammy Award, and a Special Tony Award.
17. Steve Martin^{◊} won the Academy Honorary Award, a competitive Emmy Award, and five competitive Grammy Awards.
18. Elaine May won the Academy Honorary Award, a competitive Grammy Award, and a competitive Tony Award.
19. Dolly Parton^{†, ◊} won a competitive Emmy Award, 11 competitive Grammy Awards, and the Jean Hersholt Humanitarian Award, a non-competitive Academy Award.
20. Stephen Schwartz won three competitive Academy Awards, three competitive Grammys and the Isabelle Stevenson Award, a non-competitive Tony Award.
21. Bruce Springsteen^{◊} won a competitive Academy Award, 20 competitive Grammy Awards, and a Special Tony Award.
22. Thomas Stockham^{†} won an Academy Scientific and Technical Award, a Technology & Engineering Emmy Award, and a Technical Grammy Award.
23. Cicely Tyson^{†} won three competitive Emmy Awards, a competitive Tony Award, and an Academy Honorary Award.
24. Eli Wallach^{†} won a competitive Emmy Award, a competitive Tony Award, and an Academy Honorary Award.
25. Diane Warren won a competitive Emmy Award, Grammy Award, and an Academy Honorary Award.
26. Oprah Winfrey won competitive Emmy Awards, a competitive Tony Award, and the Jean Hersholt Humanitarian Award, a non-competitive Academy Award.

Notes

† – Person is deceased.
◊ – Person has been nominated at least once for a competitive category of the missing award but has failed to win.

== Four nominations ==
The following people have not won all four awards in competitive categories but have received at least one nomination for each of them:

1. Lynn Ahrens
2. Alan Alda
3. Woody Allen
4. Judith Anderson^{†}
5. Kristen Anderson-Lopez
6. Julie Andrews
7. Alan Arkin^{†}
8. Howard Ashman (Note: Howard Ashman was never nominated for an Emmy, but won a special Emmy Award for his contributions to Cartoon All-Stars to the Rescue.)^{†}
9. Burt Bacharach^{†}
10. Lauren Bacall^{†}
11. Ed Begley^{†}
12. Elmer Bernstein^{†}
13. Leonard Bernstein^{†}
14. Danielle Brooks
15. Ralph Burns^{†}
16. Ellen Burstyn
17. Richard Burton^{†}
18. David Byrne
19. Sammy Cahn^{†}
20. Keith Carradine
21. Diahann Carroll^{†}
22. Stockard Channing
23. Don Cheadle
24. Glenn Close
25. Cy Coleman^{†}
26. Fred Ebb^{†}
27. Cynthia Erivo
28. José Ferrer^{†}
29. Henry Fonda^{†}
30. Jane Fonda
31. Morgan Freeman
32. Judy Garland (Note: Judy Garland was never nominated for a Tony, but did receive a Special Tony Award.)^{†}
33. Jack Gilford^{†}
34. Elliot Goldenthal
35. Brian Grazer
36. Joel Grey
37. Julie Harris^{†}
38. Katharine Hepburn^{†}
39. Jeremy Irons
40. Hugh Jackman
41. James Earl Jones^{†}
42. Quincy Jones^{†}
43. John Kander
44. Tony Kushner
45. Angela Lansbury^{†}
46. Michel Legrand^{†}
47. Jack Lemmon^{†}
48. John Lithgow
49. Kenny Loggins
50. Frank Marshall
51. Max Martin
52. Steve Martin (Note: Steve Martin has not received an Oscar nomination, but has won an Academy Honorary Award.)
53. Bette Midler
54. Liza Minnelli
55. Lin-Manuel Miranda
56. Paul Newman^{†}
57. Laurence Olivier^{†}
58. Leslie Odom Jr.
59. Al Pacino
60. Trey Parker
61. Dolly Parton^{†}
62. Christopher Plummer^{†}
63. Sidney Poitier^{†}
64. André Previn^{†}
65. Lynn Redgrave (Note: Lynn Redgrave is one of only two people to date to be nominated at least once for each of the four awards, without winning any.)^{†}
66. Vanessa Redgrave
67. John C. Reilly (Note: John C. Reilly is one of only two people to date to be nominated at least once for each of the four awards, without winning any.)
68. Jason Robards^{†}
69. Mark Ruffalo
70. Adam Schlesinger^{†}
71. Paul Scofield^{†}
72. Marc Shaiman
73. David Shire
74. Paul Simon
75. Glenn Slater
76. Will Smith
77. Tom Snow
78. Kevin Spacey
79. Bruce Springsteen (Note: Bruce Springsteen has not received a Tony nomination, but received a Special Tony Award.)
80. Sting
81. Maureen Stapleton^{†}
82. Barbra Streisand
83. Meryl Streep
84. Lily Tomlin
85. Stanley Tucci
86. Peter Ustinov^{†}
87. Jimmy Van Heusen^{†}
88. Denzel Washington
89. Sigourney Weaver
90. James Whitmore^{†}
91. Scott Wittman
92. Hans Zimmer

Notes

† – Person is deceased.

== Variations ==
=== PEGOT ===
There are conflicting definitions for the PEGOT. Some say the "P" refers to the Peabody Award, others say it is the Pulitzer Prize. As of 2024, Mel Brooks, Rita Moreno, Mike Nichols, and Barbra Streisand have achieved this status by winning the Peabody while Marvin Hamlisch and Richard Rodgers have achieved it by winning the Pulitzer.

EGOT winners who also won at least one Peabody Award:

1. Mel Brooks
2. Rita Moreno
3. Mike Nichols^{†}
4. Barbra Streisand (Note: Streisand's Tony Award was non-competitive.)

EGOT winners who also won at least one Pulitzer Prize:

1. Marvin Hamlisch^{†}
2. Richard Rodgers^{†} (Note: Rodgers, the first to complete the EGOT (1962), on that same day completed the first PEGOT variation, having won a Pulitzer Prize in 1944.)

People who won a Peabody, lacking only one EGOT award:

1. Carol Burnett (Note: Burnett's Tony Award was non-competitive.) (missing an Oscar)
2. Martin Charnin^{†} (missing an Oscar)
3. Rob Epstein (missing a Tony)
4. Anne Garefino (missing an Oscar)
5. Kathleen Kennedy (Note: Kennedy's Academy Award was non-competitive.) (missing a Tony)
6. James Moll (missing a Tony)
7. Trey Parker (missing an Oscar)
8. Matt Stone (missing an Oscar)
9. Charles Strouse (missing an Oscar)
10. Lily Tomlin (missing an Oscar)
11. Cicely Tyson^{†} (Note: Tyson's Academy Award was non-competitive.) (missing a Grammy)
12. Oprah Winfrey (Note: Winfrey's Academy Award was non-competitive.) (missing a Grammy)

People who won a Pulitzer, lacking only one EGOT award:

1. Jerry Bock^{†} (missing an Oscar)
2. Oscar Hammerstein II^{†} (missing an Emmy)
3. Tom Kitt (missing an Oscar)
4. Frank Loesser^{†} (missing an Emmy)
5. Lin-Manuel Miranda (missing an Oscar)
6. Stephen Sondheim^{†} (missing an Emmy)

Notes † – Person is deceased.

=== REGOT ===
Another variation is the REGOT, which includes being awarded a Razzie Award. Alan Menken has a REGOT due to his Razzie win (with Jack Feldman) for Worst Original Song for "High Times, Hard Times" from Newsies. With her Razzie win for Worst Actress for Rent-a-Cop and Arthur 2: On the Rocks, Liza Minnelli has a REGOT if her non-competitive Grammy Legend Award is considered.

Lady Gaga reordered the acronym as EGORT, when she hosted Saturday Night Live and poked fun at her win for Worst Screen Combo (with Joaquin Phoenix) from Joker: Folie à Deux.

Alternatively, publications such as Vulture have listed the REGOT as including an induction into the Rock and Roll Hall of Fame. The only person to have such a REGOT is Elton John although Harry Belafonte and Quincy Jones would be included if counting non-competitive awards.

== Equivalent honors outside the United States ==
The Emmy, Grammy, Oscar, and Tony Awards are presided over by industry bodies based in the United States, and as of 2026, 17 out of the 22 EGOT winners were American nationals. The remaining five―John Gielgud, Audrey Hepburn, Elton John, Andrew Lloyd Webber, and Tim Rice―were British. Many countries hold their own equivalent awards ceremonies honouring their own television, music, film, and theatre industries. In some cases, commentators in other countries have derived their own acronyms for individuals who have won at all four ceremonies.

=== Canada ===
In 2018, Leah Collins of CBC Arts proposed a Canadian equivalent of the EGOT: the Canadian Screen Awards (and their predecessors, the Gemini Awards and the Genie Awards) for film and television, the Juno Awards for music, and the Dora Mavor Moore Awards for theatre. Toronto-based game show Trivia Club referred to this combination as the "Two-Can-Ju-Do". No individual has won in all four categories.

=== Australia ===
In 2019, Caitlin Welsh of Nova Entertainment proposed the "LAHA" as an Australian equivalent: the Logie Awards for television, the ARIA Music Awards for music, the Helpmann Awards for theatre, and the AACTA Awards for film. She also could not identify any winners of all four awards, although Noni Hazlehurst has received nominations in all four.

== See also ==
- Academy Awards
- Emmy Awards
  - Children's and Family Emmy Awards
  - Daytime Emmy Awards
  - International Emmy Awards
  - News and Documentary Emmy Awards
  - Primetime Emmy Awards
  - Sports Emmy Awards
  - Technology and Engineering Emmy Awards
- Grammy Awards
- Tony Awards
- Triple Crown of Acting
