= Grammy Legend Award =

Special music award of merit given to recording artists

- Awarded for: ongoing contributions and influence in the music industry
- Country: United States
- Presented by: The Recording Academy
- First award: 1990
- Website: grammy.com

The Grammy Legend Award, or the Grammy Living Legend Award, is a special award of merit given to recording artists by the Grammy Awards, a music awards ceremony that was established in 1958. Honors in several categories are presented at the ceremony annually by the National Academy of Recording Arts and Sciences of the United States for outstanding achievements in the music industry.

The first Grammy Legend Awards were issued in 1990 to Smokey Robinson, Willie Nelson, Andrew Lloyd Webber, and Liza Minnelli. The honor was inaugurated to recognize "ongoing contributions and influence in the recording field". The next year, four more musicians (Aretha Franklin, Billy Joel, Johnny Cash and Quincy Jones) were acknowledged with Grammy Legend Awards. The award was given to Barbra Streisand in 1992 and Michael Jackson in 1993.

After 1994, when the American musicians Curtis Mayfield and Frank Sinatra were both issued Grammy Legend Awards, the honors have been given to recording artists intermittently. Italian operatic tenor Luciano Pavarotti was the 1998 recipient of the award. The following year, British singer-songwriter Elton John was recognized with the honor. The Bee Gees are the only recipient of the award in the 21st century, when they received the award in 2003. Overall, fourteen solo musicians and one band have received the Grammy Legend Award.

== Recipients ==
| Year (Note: Each year is linked to an article about the Annual Grammy Awards ceremony of that year.) | | | Ref. |
|---|---|---|---|
| 1990 | Andrew Lloyd Webber in 2009 | Andrew Lloyd Webber | |
| 1990 | Liza Minnelli as Sally Bowles from Cabaret (1972) | Liza Minnelli | |
| 1990 | Smokey Robinson in 2018 | Smokey Robinson | |
| 1990 | Willie Nelson in 2006 | Willie Nelson | |
| 1991 | Aretha Franklin in 1968 | Aretha Franklin | |
| 1991 | Billy Joel in 2009 | Billy Joel | |
| 1991 | Johnny Cash in 1969 | Johnny Cash | |
| 1991 | Quincy Jones in 2014 | Quincy Jones | |
| 1992 | Barbra Streisand in 1966 | Barbra Streisand | |
| 1993 | Michael Jackson in 1984 | Michael Jackson | |
| 1994 | Curtis Mayfield in 1972 | Curtis Mayfield | |
| 1994 | Frank Sinatra in Pal Joey (1957) | Frank Sinatra | |
| 1998 | Luciano Pavarotti in 2002 | Luciano Pavarotti | |
| 1999 | Elton John in 2011 | Elton John | |
| 2003 | Bee Gees in 1978 | Bee Gees | |

== See also ==
- List of Grammy Award categories
