= Audrey (2020 film) =

- Official film poster
- Directed by: Helena Coan
- Produced by: Nick Taussig; Paul Van Carter; Annabel Wigoder
- Narrated by: Audrey Hepburn
- Cinematography: Simona Susnea
- Edited by: Mark Keady
- Music by: Alex Somers
- Production companies: Salon Pictures; XYZ Films
- Distributed by: Universal Pictures Home Entertainment
- Release date: December 15, 2020
- Running time: 100 minutes
- Country: United Kingdom
- Language: English

Audrey is a 2020 documentary film about the life of British actress and humanitarian Audrey Hepburn. Directed by Helena Coan, it was produced with the involvement of Hepburn's elder son, Sean Hepburn Ferrer, and granddaughter, Emma Ferrer. Originally slated for a theatrical release, it was released on DVD and Blu-ray on December 15, 2020, as well as digitally and on Netflix on January 5, 2021. The film has received generally favorable reviews.

== Synopsis ==
The film tells Hepburn's life story, including childhood experiences during World War II, her early ballet career in London, her journey to Hollywood stardom, and tenure as an ambassador of UNICEF before her death. It also recounts her marriages and relationships with Mel Ferrer, Andrea Dotti, and Robert Wolders.

Hepburn appears in archival footage throughout the film, and serves as its narrator. Dance-based "portraits" of Hepburn, portrayed by three ballerinas, are interwoven with interviews with Hepburn's family and friends, as well as actors, designers, and humanitarians.

== Cast ==
- Audrey Hepburn (archive footage)
  - Keira Moore as young Audrey (1930s)
  - Francesca Hayward as Audrey during her Hollywood years (1960s)
  - Alessandra Ferri as Audrey during her UNICEF ambassadorship (1990s)
- Sean Hepburn Ferrer
- Emma Ferrer
- Peter Bogdanovich
- Richard Dreyfuss
- Anna Cataldi
- Clare Waight Keller
- John Loring
- Pierluigi Christophe Orunesu
- Andrew Wald
- Mita Ungaro

== Production ==
After producers Nick Taussig and Annabel Wigoder finished production on McQueen (2018), the team began to pursue making a film following the life of film star Audrey Hepburn. The film spend three years in development before Taussig and Wigoder obtained a meeting with Sean Hepburn Ferrer, Hepburn's elder son. Ferrer was persuaded to allow the film to move forward after British filmmaker Helena Coan was hired to direct, as he wanted Hepburn's story to be a "modern telling" through the "lens of a woman". Taussig, Wigoder and Coan sought to center the film around Hepburn's personal life experiences, and love of dance, and feature interviews by her loved ones. Taussig admitted the film required a "delicate touch", saying that they didn't make a deal with Hepburn's estate to prevent "making a brand film", but respected the access that Hepburn's loved ones gave to producers. Hepburn's narration throughout the film is sourced from American journalist Glenn Plaskin's tapes interviews from US Weekly articles before her death.

Audrey was produced by Salon Pictures and XYZ Films, with US rights obtained by Good Deed Entertainment in July 2019. Paul Van Carter and Wayne McGregor joined as producer and choreographer, respectively. Alex Somers scored the film, inspired by the music of the Golden Age of Hollywood as well as the "theatre" of Hepburn's passion for ballet, which is emphasized in the documentary. Phil Hunt and Compton Ross serve as executive producers. Production was financed by Head Gear Films and Metrol Technology.

== Release ==
The film was originally slated for a 2020 theatrical release, yet was made available on DVD and Blu-ray on December 15, 2020, as well as digitally and on Netflix on January 5, 2021.

== Reception ==
On review aggregator website Rotten Tomatoes, the film holds an approval rating of 79% based on 24 reviews, with an average rating of 6.3/10. The site's critics consensus reads, "While it lacks new insights, Audrey peels back the layers behind Audrey Hepburn's life with all the gloss and shine befitting a Hollywood legend." On Metacritic, the film holds a rating of 66 out of 100, based on 5 critics, indicating "generally favorable reviews".

Tim Robey from The Telegraph wrote that the film leaves the viewer "itching" to read a meaty biography of Hepburn's life, and argues that her "deeper calling ... was as a regal champion of the dispossessed." Writing for The Evening Standard, Charlotte O'Sullivan praised the dance sequences as "poignant" but stated that the film lacked Hepburn's "bite". Candice Frederick of Elle praised the documentary as "enthralling" and praised it for its intimate and authentic perspective. Richard Roeper of the Chicago Sun-Times wrote that the "worshipful documentary breaks no new ground" but serves as a "valuable reminder" of Hepburn's persona and legacy.

Writing for The Guardian, critic Peter Bradshaw praised the film for its candidacy of her childhood and early life, but opined that it didn't give sufficient weight to her acting. Leslie Felperi of The Hollywood Reporter deemed the film "fundamentally well-curated" and "tend[ded] toward gauzy, loving hagiography, emphasizing the star's kindness". Both Felperi and Bradshaw criticized the documentary for not emphasizing lesser-known parts of her filmography.
