= Fashion of Audrey Hepburn =

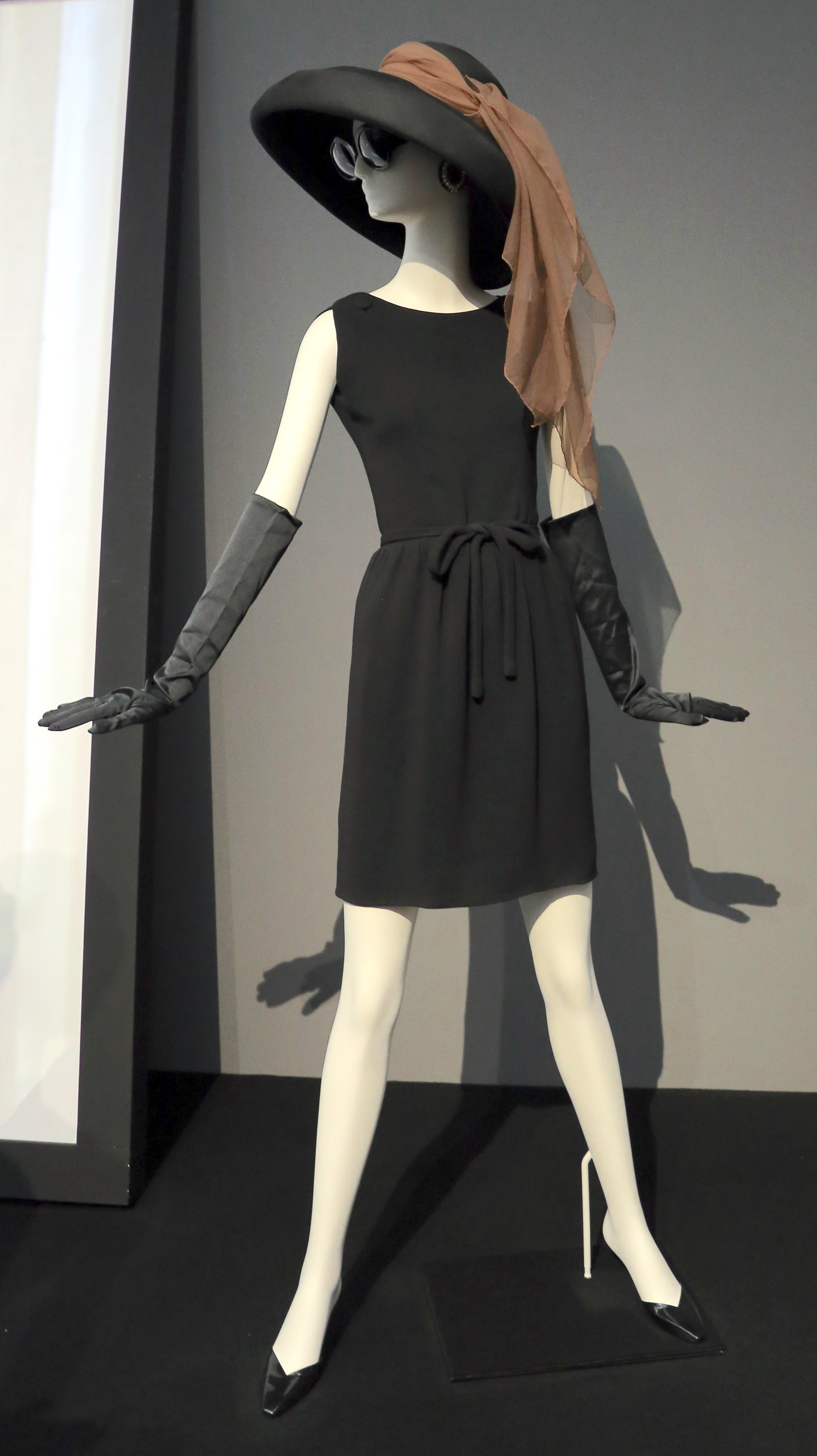
Hepburn's dress from Breakfast at Tiffany's (1961) on display

The fashion of actress Audrey Hepburn, both on and off-screen, has impacted trends and pop culture, and she is considered a style icon.

== Fashion and style ==
I remember the beautiful evening dresses: Givenchy always, and Valentino in Rome ... pea-coats in the winter, collars turned up ... square-toed boots in the 1970s, cotton pants and Lacostes in the summer, ballet slippers and a long robe around the house in the morning.

— Sean Hepburn Ferrer, Audrey Hepburn: An Elegant Spirit

Hepburn's style, subject to prominence after her rise to fame in the 1950s, was associated with timelessness and tailoring. Hepburn had a confident sense in her own manner of dressing, and sought simple, refined pieces to emphasize her silhouette and profile. She believed that women should find their own complementary "look", rather than rely on trends, and accessorize it seasonally. Hepburn invested in quality pieces, and put intentional thought into her ensembles by occasion. She admired simple lines and elegant looks, designed to complement her, rather than stand out. Hepburn veered toward underdressing, rather than overdressing, saying that "it is better to be the only one in a blazer at a black-tie event then be the only one in black tie at a blazer event".

Pieces associated with her brand of fashion included cigarette pants, black polo necks, trench coats, marinières, headbands, waist belts, ballet flats, oversized white shirt, the indigo jean, the gingham trouser and head scarves. She also frequently wore sheath dresses, bateau necklines, cropped pants, emphasized waistlines, and button-downs. She occasionally wore suits and trousers, but often accentuated the look with accessories to preserve a feminine touch. Her fashion has been referred to as sophisticated, minimalist, elegant, polished, and mod. Hepburn typically chose a muted palette of black, white, beige, and pink, which emphasized the darker undertones of her eyes and hair. She "compensated" for her height by wearing ballet slippers and flat shoes. She frequently wore patterns of stripes and gingham. Her "daily uniform" consisted of slack trousers or skirts paired with a blouse. Academic Rachel Moseley describes the combination of "slim black trousers, flat ballet-style pumps and a fine black jersey" as one of her signature looks alongside little black dresses, noting that this style was new at the time when women still wore skirts and high heels more often than trousers and flat shoe.

Hepburn stated that fashion "came into her life" upon her first meeting with Hubert de Givenchy, whom she regarded as a "creator of [her] personality". She became his muse, and the two became so closely associated with each other that academic Jayne Sheridan has stated, "we might ask 'Did Audrey Hepburn create Givenchy or was it the other way around?'" The pair conceptualized Hepburn's "signature" ensemble - a bateau neckline dress with a fitted bodice and full skirting. The ensemble, dubbed "The Hepburn Look", popularized Givenchy's minimalist tailoring and boosted sales. Givenchy created the evening gown she wore to the 1954 Academy Awards, a white lace ensemble with an ivory full skirt that Hepburn referred to as her "lucky dress". Givenchy also designed her second wedding gown, a light-pink polo neck mini dress, worn in a ceremony to Andrea Dotti. Rather than borrow clothes, she owned her wardrobe and paid full price for Givenchy's creations. From 1956, Hepburn's contract stipulated that she would be dressed by Givenchy in all contemporary-set films. Hepburn herself stated that Givenchy "gave me a look, a kind, a silhouette. He has always been the best, and he stayed the best. Because he kept the spare style that I love. What is more beautiful than a simple sheath made an extraordinary way in a special fabric, and just two earrings?"

She developed an association with Valentino upon her move to Rome, where she was often photographed by paparazzi. Hepburn was close to shoemaker Salvatore Ferragamo, and opined that quality shoes could be worn in tandem with simple clothing. She also wore Ralph Lauren for much of her off-duty looks later in life.

== In film ==
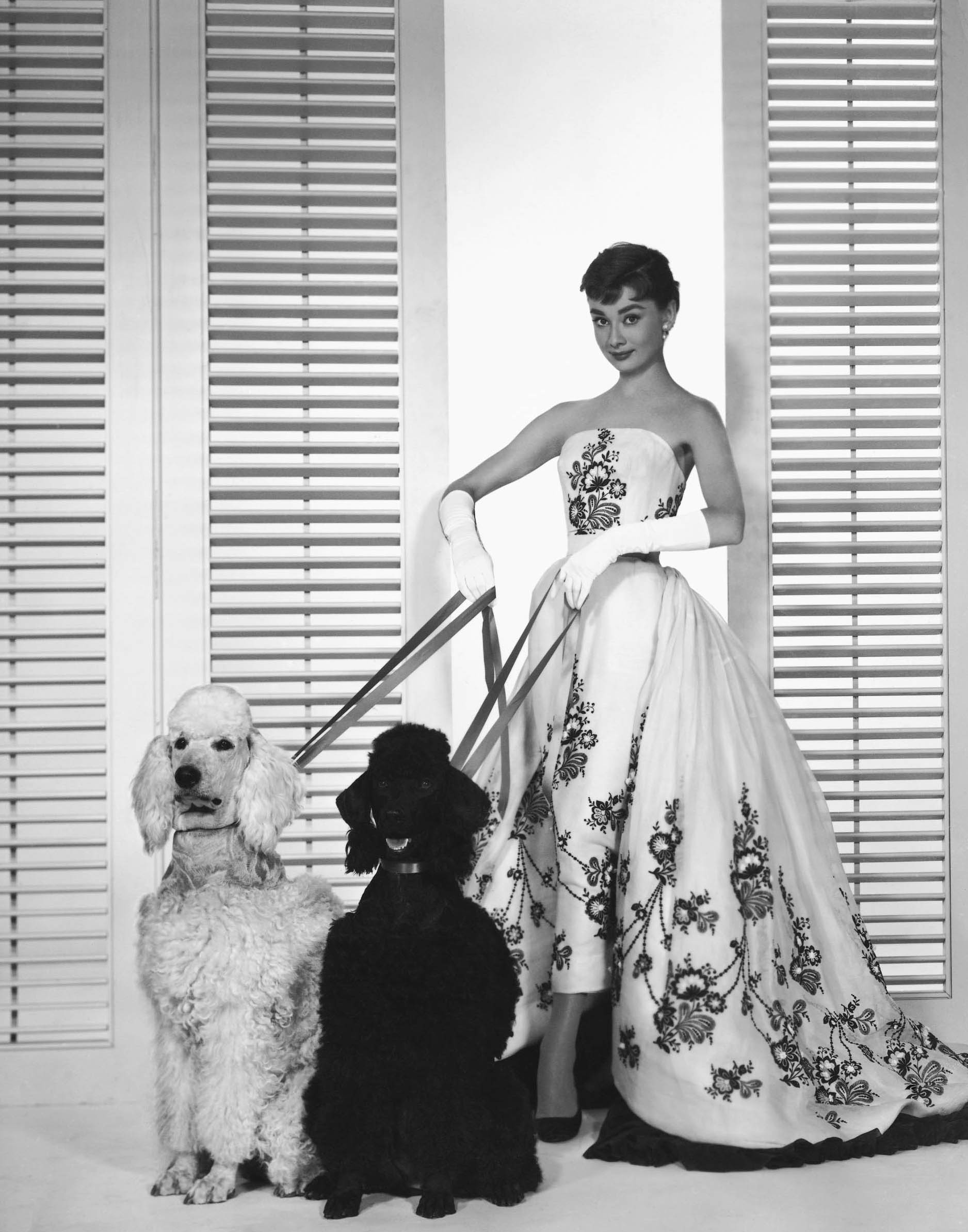
Hepburn in the promotional photograph for Sabrina (1954), her first Givenchy collaboration

Hepburn's debut, Roman Holiday, where she played a mid-century, run-away princess, featured a minimalist wardrobe, with her gamine looks considered watershed for the time. Her character appeared in corseted taffeta gowns before transitioning into belted midi skirts, lace-up sandals, feminine cotton blouses, ballet flats, and printed silk scarves.

Her collaboration with Givenchy in the film Sabrina (1954), where she was cast as the titular chauffeur's daughter, determined classic elements central to her wardrobe that "defined her image" for the duration of her career. Though originally to be designed by Edith Head, director Billy Wilder sent Hepburn to Paris to peruse authentic Parisian designs, which led her to meet Givenchy. The numbers chosen personally by Hepburn included: a gray, Oxford-wool, double-breasted skirt suit with a scoop neck, cinched waist, and vented skirting, and a strapless white ball gown with floral organdy embroidering and a cascading train of black ruffles, as well as a black cocktail dress with a button, down, deep-v back, and flared, ballerina-length. The final dress featured a bateau neckline that became popularly known as the décolleté Sabrina, or Sabrina neckline, which Hepburn became fond of as it emphasized her shape rather than her thinness.

One of her most-worn ensembles premiered in Funny Face (1957), where her character, a studious Beatnik librarian, comes out of her shell. Hepburn wore a black polo neck, a taupe trench coat, black trousers, and black penny loafers for scenes in France. She also wears a vermillion satin gown alongside white opera gloves. Hepburn plays a demure conservatory student in Love in the Afternoon (1957), which features outfits with "preppy feminine charm", such as bold knit cardigans, striped trousers, a-line cotton sundresses, and hair ribbons.

The 1961 film Breakfast at Tiffany's, where Hepburn portrays high-class café society girl Holly Golightly, has been reported to exemplify the cinematography and fashion of the decade. In the opening scene, filmed on Fifth Avenue, Hepburn wore a little black dress, regarded as one of the most iconic in cinema, inspiring several imitations. It is a sheath, satin full-length gown with minimalist cutouts, paired with sunglasses, kitten heels, a multi-layered pearl necklace and a hair brooch. Other outfits worn in the film include an oversized white men's shirt, paired with a turquoise sleep mask, a silk cocktail, scoop-neck, feathered hem minidress, a pair of straight-leg jeans worn with a simple sweatshirt, a bedsheet fashioned to be worn as a party dress, a knee-length hot pink sleeveless frock, embroidered with a sweeping bow and small rhinestone fans, Breakfast At Tiffany's is considered to be Hepburn's most defining film, and cemented her status as a style icon.

My Fair Lady (1964), featuring Hepburn as Eliza Doolittle, tracks her character's transformation through fashion, and includes the emblematic ensemble of a white lace gown with lavish ribbon trimming, paired with a complimentary umbrella of tulle and wide-brim black-and-white hat. She portrays the daughter of an art forger in the 1966 film How to Steal a Million, incorporating an aristocratic slant to sixties mod-trends, such as sculptural tailoring, brightly coloured overcoats, costume jewellery, and white sunglasses. Hepburn was cast as a screenwriter's assistant in Paris When It Sizzles (1967), donning bolder hues, including an orange drape-back shirtdress, pistachio skirt suit, and a cotton-candy shift dress.

== Legacy ==
[Hepburn]'s so embedded in our understanding of fashion history; her outfits on and off screen both totally timeless and emblematic of the sartorial shifts and changes of the latter half of the 20th century. .. many of the clothes from her films — including the little black dress she wore as Holly Golightly, and the humble polo neck in Funny Face (1957) — are now the definition of iconic.

— Rosalind Jana for Vogue magazine

Hepburn was added to the International Best Dressed Hall of Fame List in 1961. Shortly after her rise to prominence, department store Barneys New York released a clothing line inspired by her on and off-duty wardrobe. After Hepburn's death in 1993, much of her gowns were distributed by Givenchy to museums around the world. Upon Givenchy's retirement in 1995, Vanity Fair wrote that "Audrey Revivalism" gained popularity, a term referring to renewed public interest and fashion trends in line with Hepburn's life and fashion, with "legions of fans" seeking to imitate her looks. Her personal collection, including much of her clothing, was exhibited at Christie's London in 2017.

Her dressing has inspired celebrities Beyoncé, Natalie Portman, Taylor Swift, Kendall Jenner, Kiernan Shipka, Sandra Bullock, Zooey Deschanel, Lily Allen, Meghan Markle, Rachel Bilson, Zoe Kravitz, and Ariana Grande. Her on-screen fashion has influenced costuming in film and television, including Big Little Lies (2017-2019), Emily in Paris (2020-present), The Dark Knight Rises (2012), and Gossip Girl (2007-2012). Scores of designers have been reported to release designs inspired by Hepburn, including Zara and Michael Kors, Hepburn has been included in various "best-dressed" lists, including 100 Fashion Icons for Time, Women Who Changed Fashion for Harper's Bazaar, Style Icons for Forbes, and Most Influential Fashion Icons Of All Time for StyleCaster.

Hepburn's posthumous status as an icon has contributed to the ongoing relevancy of her style. Her style and appearance has been idolized by young women during and after her lifetime, with her most famous ensembles being recognizable to the public. Hepburn has been referred to as one of the most elegant women in history. Edith Head stated that Hepburn understood fashion better than any actress, with the exception of Marlene Dietrich. Isaac Mizrahi cited her with bringing minimalism into trend, while Christian Lacroix stated that Hepburn symbolized the style of her generation. Vogue France writes that Hepburn's style "embedded in our understanding of fashion history" and representative of twentieth century fashion. In 2015, her granddaughter, Emma Ferrer, posed in a photoshoot for Harper's Bazaar paying tribute to Hepburn's most memorable ensembles.

== Gallery ==
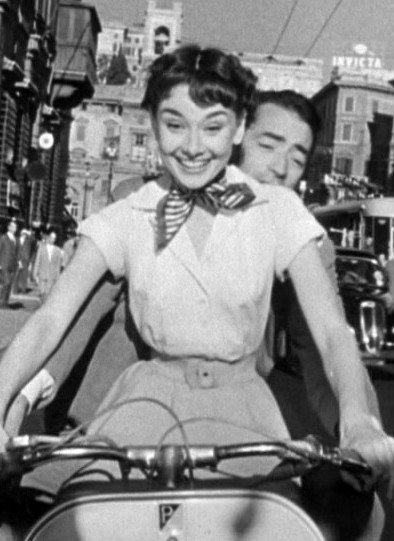
Hepburn wearing a blouse and silk scarf Roman Holiday (1953)

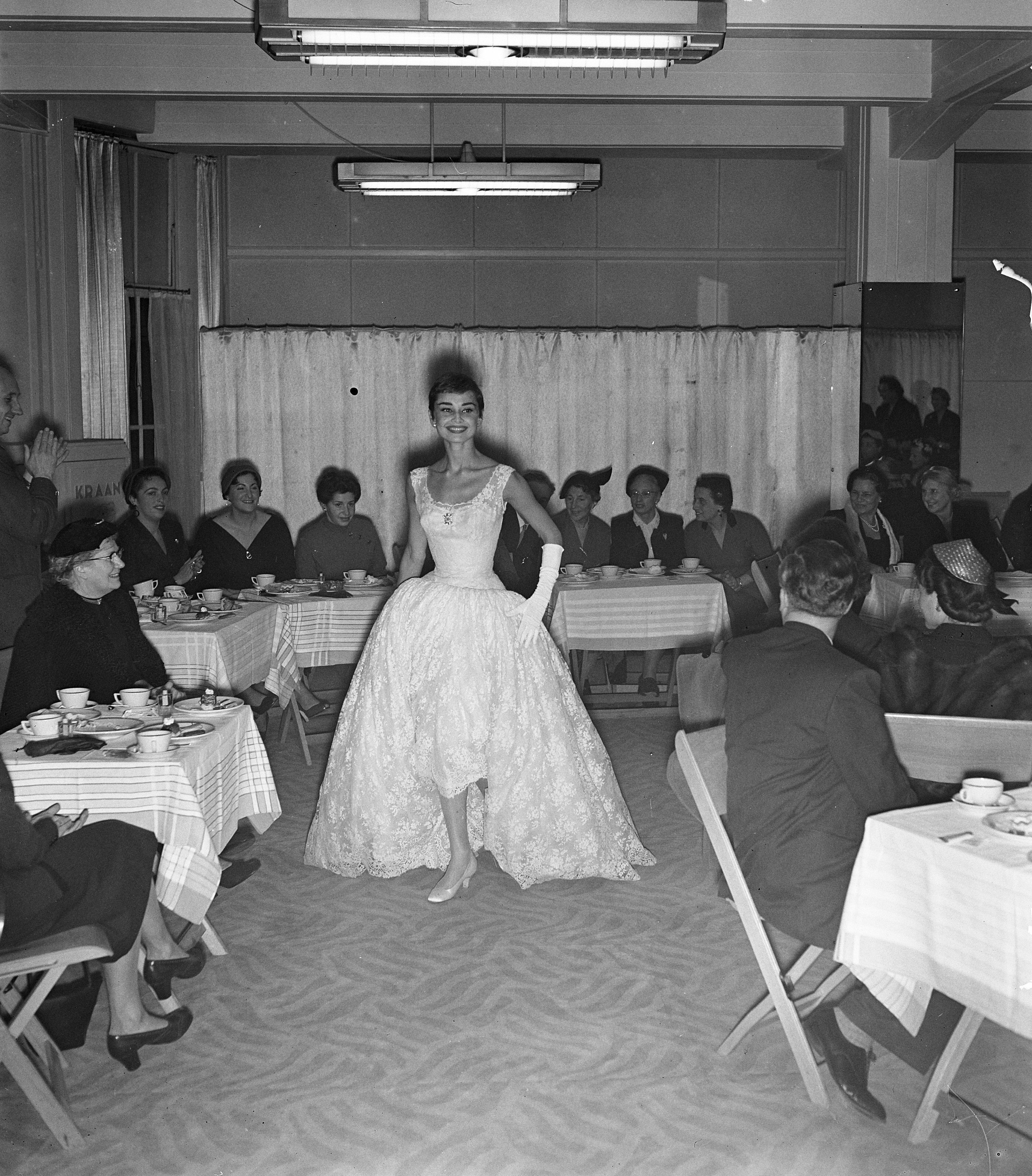
Hepburn participating in a charity fashion show for Givenchy in 1956

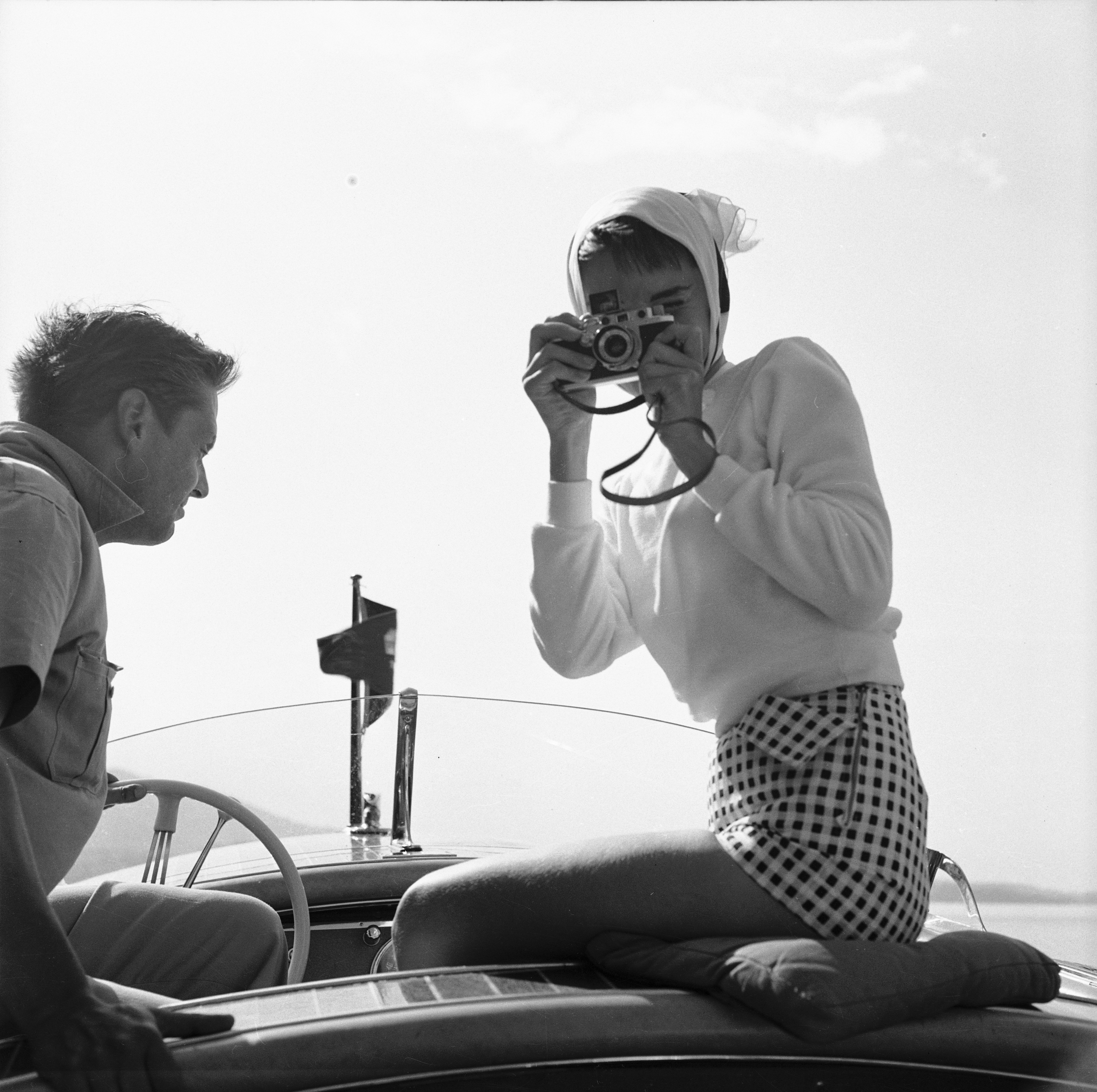
Hepburn wearing a sweater with cropped gingham shorts, c. 1954

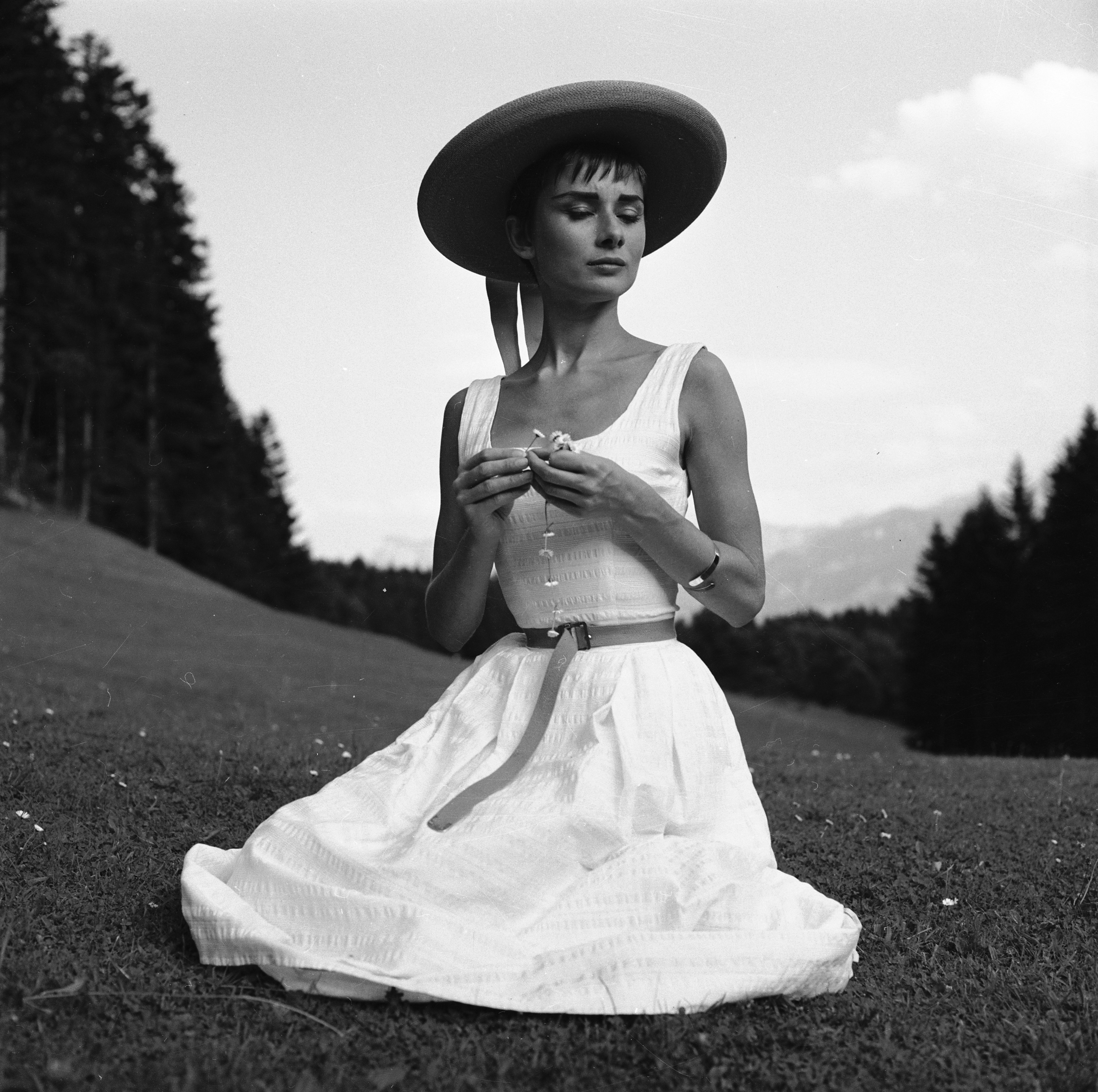
Hepburn in a light belted a-line sundress and straw hat in Switzerland, c. 1954

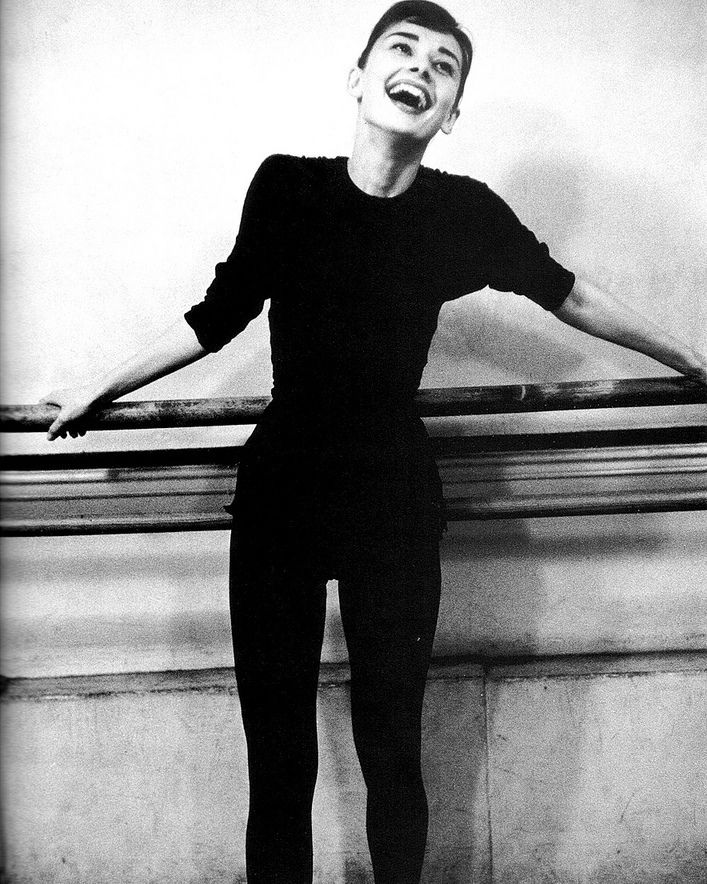
Hepburn in a black polo neck and black trousers during rehearsals in 1956

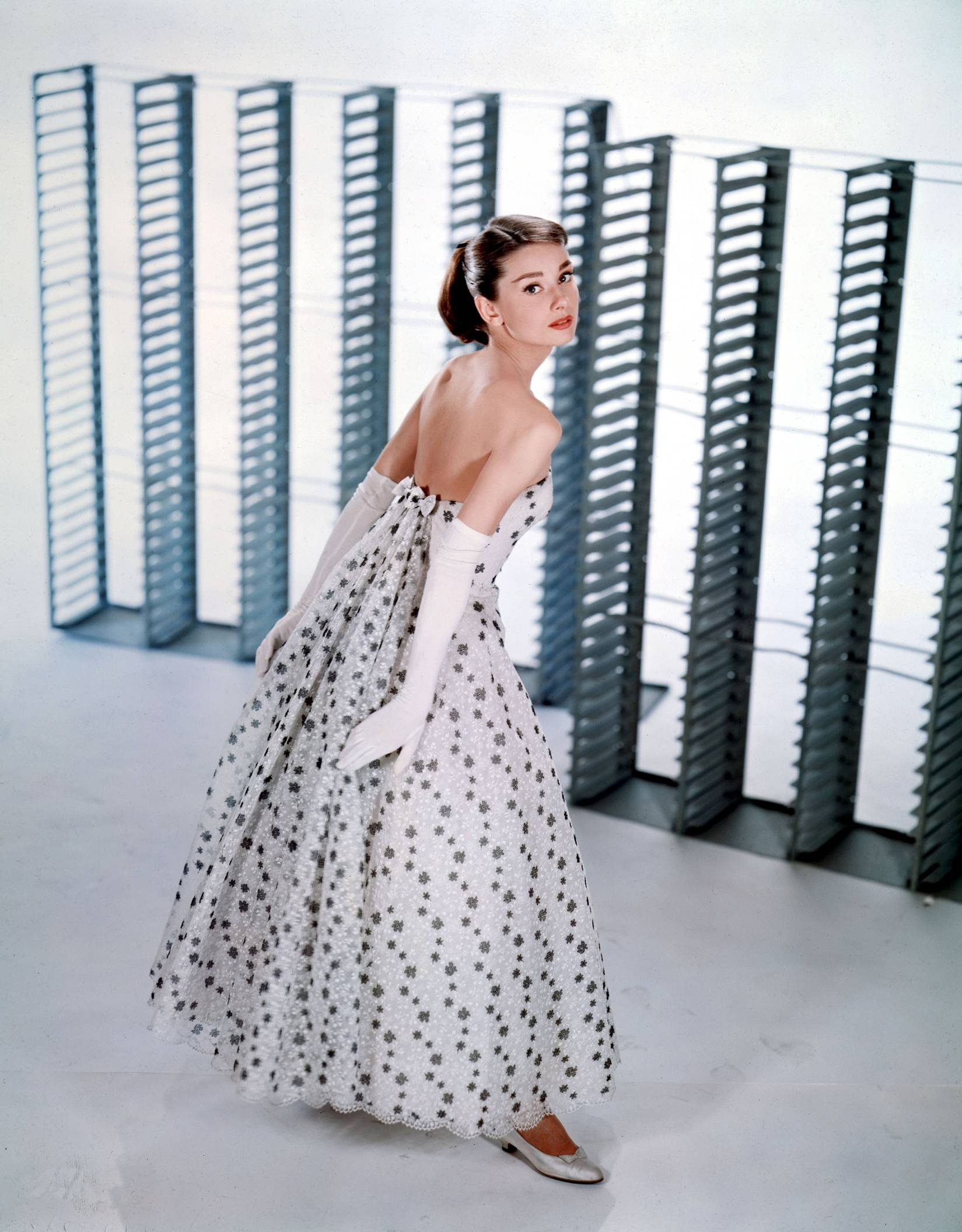
Hepburn wears a Givenchy gown in a promotional photograph for Funny Face (1957)

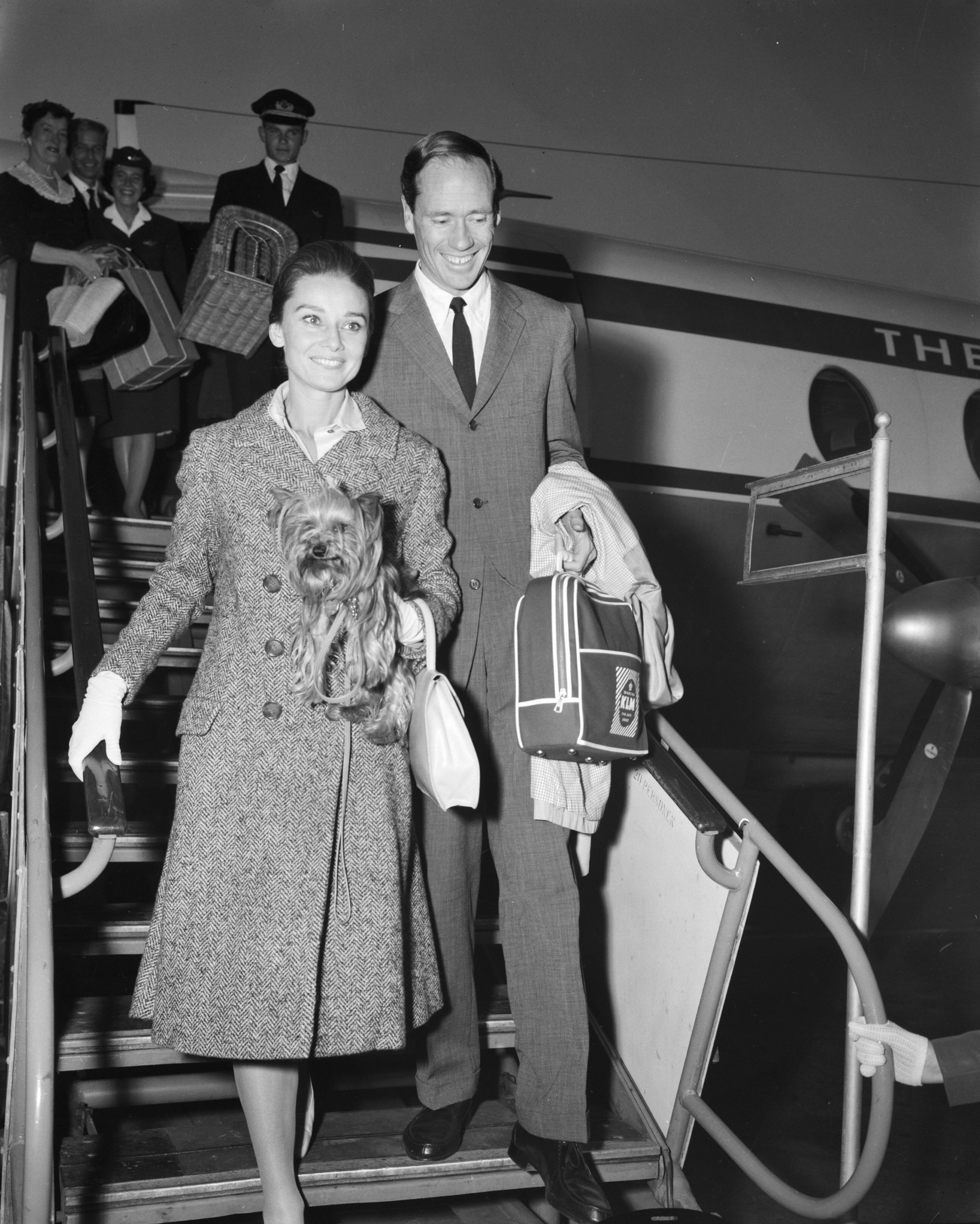
Hepburn wearing a button-up wool overcoat and gloves in 1959

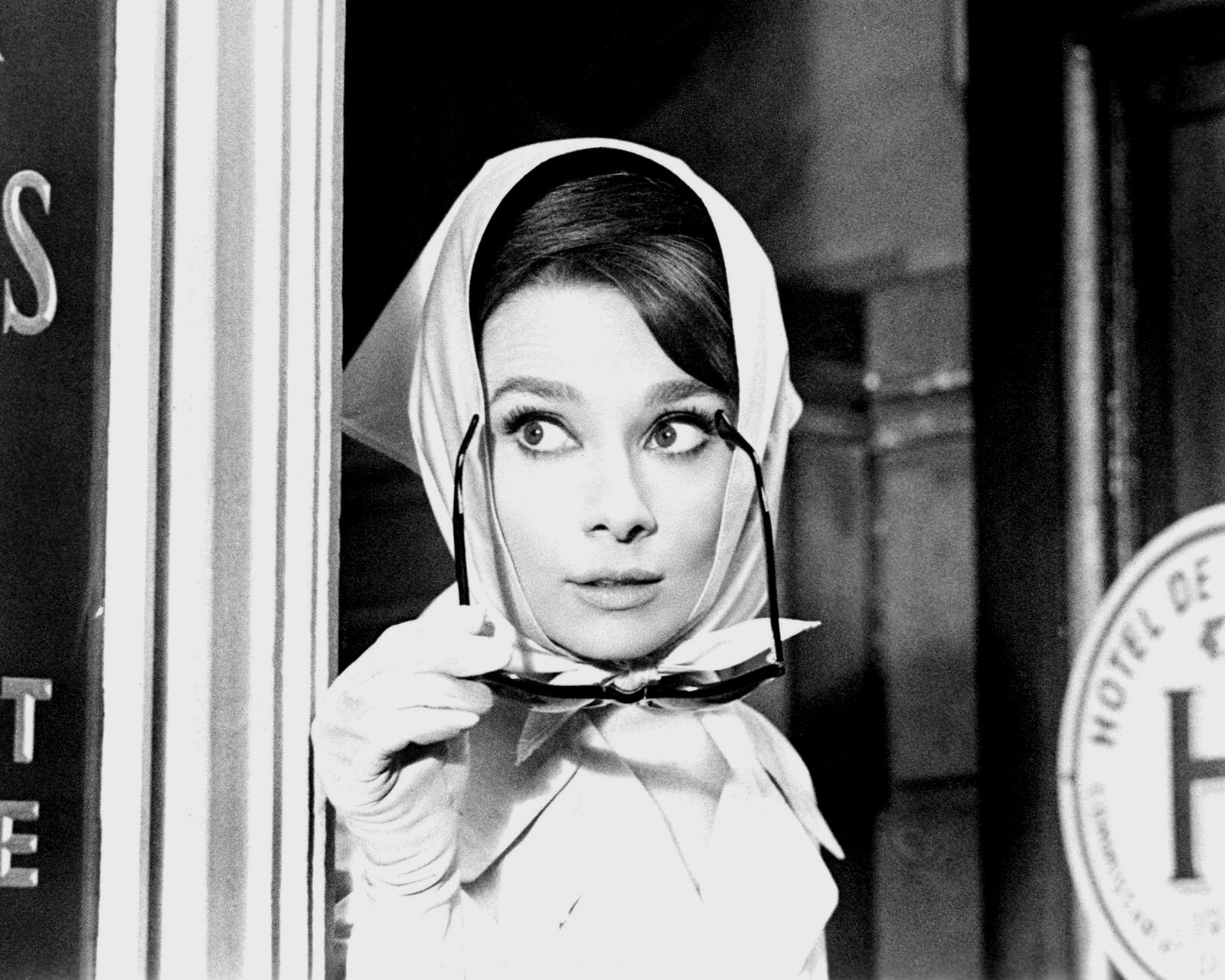
Hepburn wearing sunglasses, gloves, and a headscarf for in publicity photograph for Charade (1963)

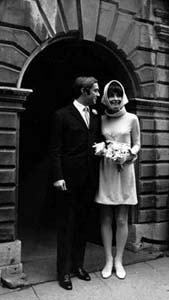
Hepburn's second wedding dress, designed by Givenchy, in 1967

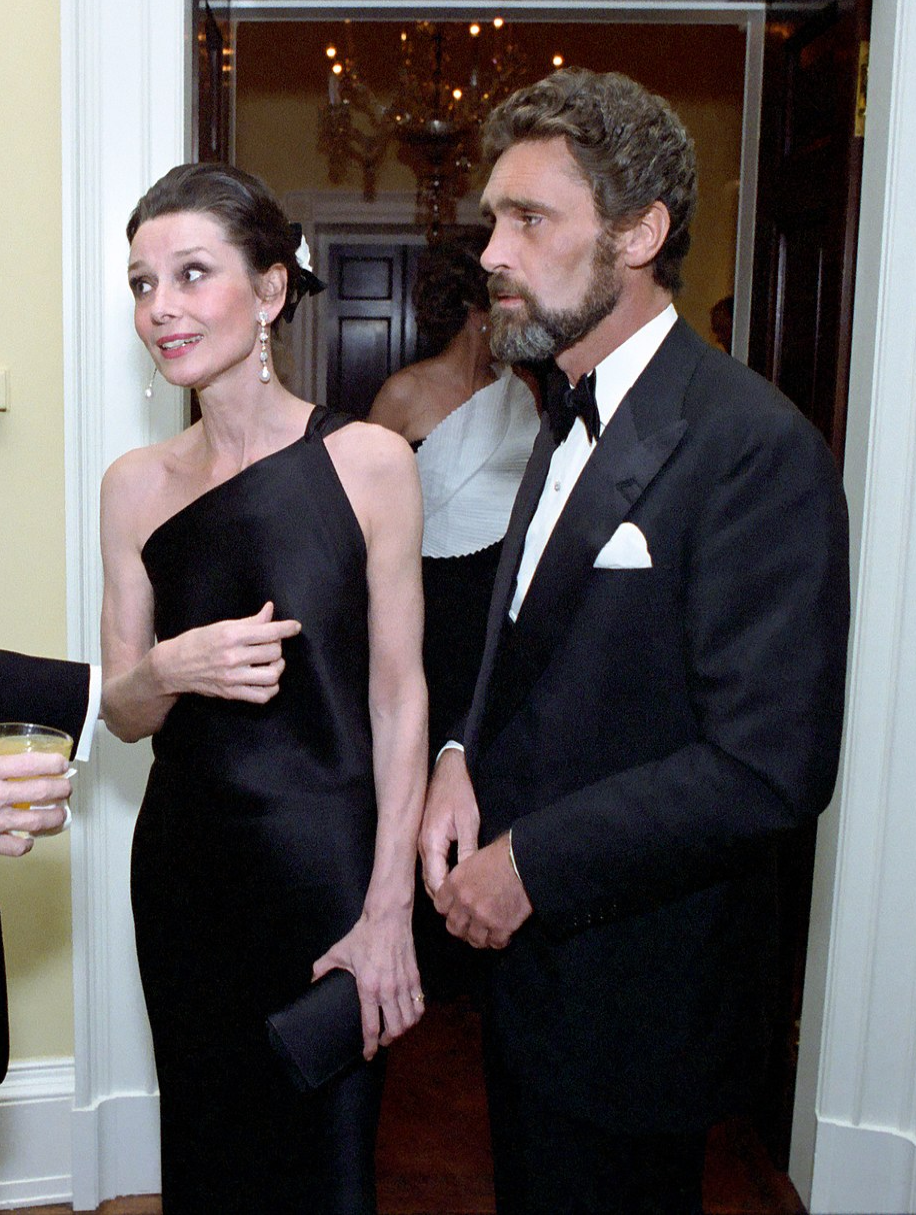
Hepburn wearing an off-the-shoulder satin black evening gown in 1981
