= Claude Tappolet =

Swiss historian and music historian (1926–2019)

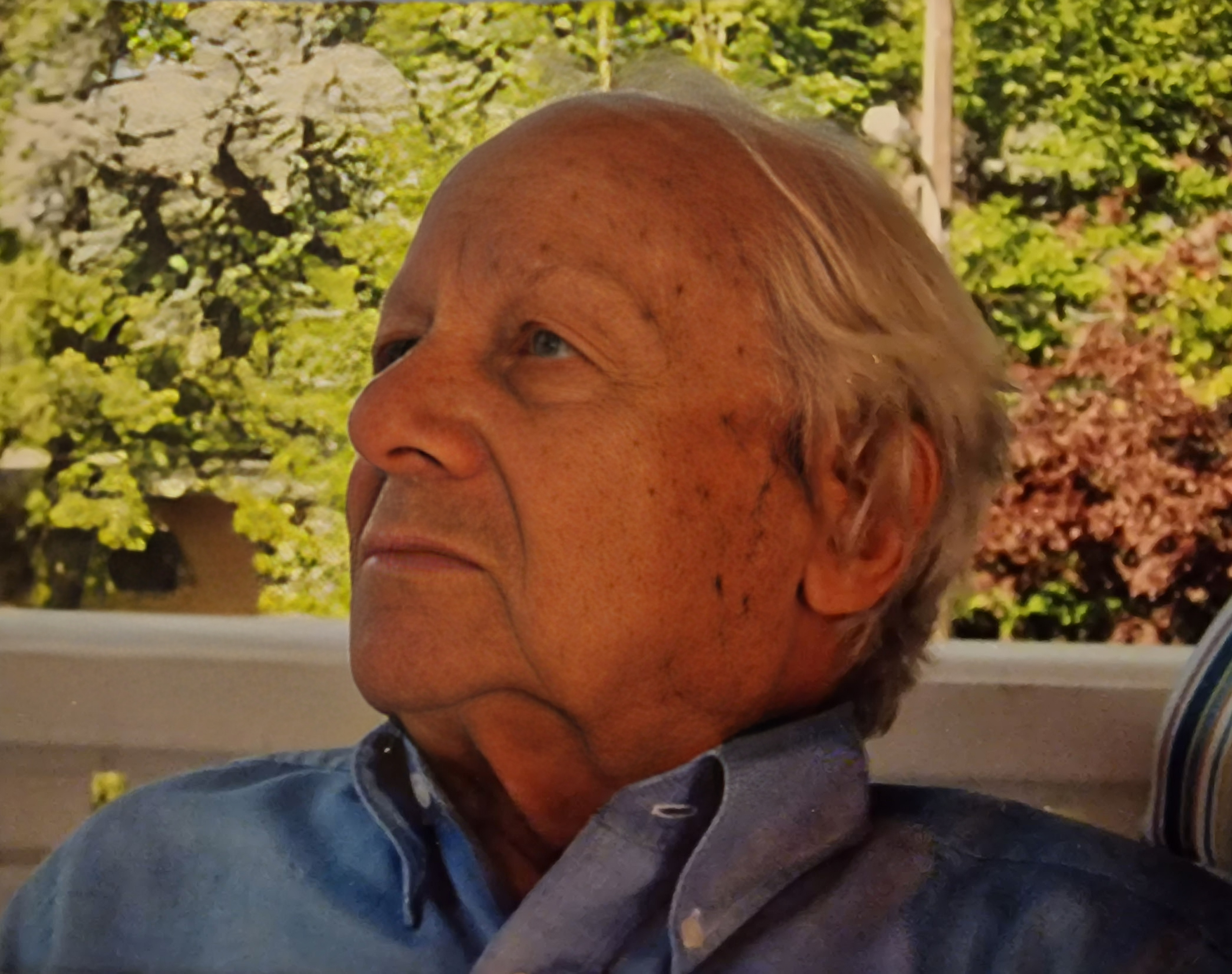
- Born: 28 August 1926; Chêne-Bougeries, Switzerland
- Died: 20 July 2019 (aged 92); Geneva, Switzerland
- Occupations: Historian, teacher
- Spouse: Claire Julliard

Claude Tappolet (28 August 1926 – 20 July 2019) was a Swiss historian and teacher who published extensively on the history of music, particularly in Geneva, and on the conductor Ernest Ansermet.

== Biography ==
Tappolet was the son of Willy Tappolet, a professor of musicology, and of Martha née Huggenberg. In 1961 he married Claire Julliard, daughter of Francis Julliard. After attending the Collège Calvin, he studied history at the University of Geneva. He then taught contemporary history at the Collège Voltaire until 1991.

Tappolet published numerous works on the history of music, notably in Geneva in the 19th and 20th centuries (1972, 1979–2003), as well as on Ernest Ansermet (several editions of his correspondence, 1981–2006).
