= The Brave Bulls (film) =

1951 film by Robert Rossen

- Theatrical release poster
- Directed by: Robert Rossen
- Screenplay by: John Bright
- Produced by: Robert Rossen
- Starring: Mel Ferrer; Miroslava; Anthony Quinn; Eugene Iglesias; José Torvay; Charlita
- Cinematography: Floyd Crosby; James Wong Howe
- Edited by: Henry Batista
- Music by: Mario Castelnuovo-Tedesco
- Production company: Columbia Pictures
- Distributed by: Columbia Pictures
- Release date: April 18, 1951
- Running time: 106 minutes
- Country: United States
- Language: English

The Brave Bulls is a 1951 American drama film directed by Robert Rossen, written by John Bright and starring Mel Ferrer, Miroslava, Anthony Quinn, Eugene Iglesias, José Torvay and Charlita. The film was released on April 18, 1951 by Columbia Pictures.

Although the film features extensive footage of bullfighting activity, the Hays Code prohibited the inclusion of graphic depictions of the killing of the bulls.

== Cast ==
- Mel Ferrer as Luis Bello
- Miroslava as Linda de Calderon
- Anthony Quinn as Raul Fuentes
- Eugene Iglesias as Pepe Bello
- José Torvay as Eladio Gomez
- Charlita as Raquelita
- Jose Luis Vasquez as Yank Delgado
- Alfonso Alvirez as Loco Ruiz
- Alfredo Aguilar as Pancho Perez
- Francisco Balderas as Monkey Garcia
- Felipe Mota as Jackdaw
- Pepe López as Farique
- Jose Meza as Little White
- Vicente Cárdenas as Goyo Salinas
- Manuel Orozco as Abundio de Lao
- Estive Domínguez as Tacho
- Silviano Sánchez as Policarpe Cana
- Francisco Reiguera as Lara
- Eduardo Arozamena as Don Alberto Iriarte
- Luis Corona as Rufino Vega
- Esther Laquin as Señora Bello
- Juan Assael as Alfredo Bello
- Delfino Morales as Indio
- Rita Conde as Lala
- Ramón Díaz Meza as Don Tiburcio Balbuenna
- Fanny Schiller as Mamacita
- Fernando Del Valle as Don Felix Aldemas

== Reception ==
In a contemporary review for The New York Times, critic Bosley Crowther wrote: "Tom Lea's absorbing story of a bull-fighter's battle against fear, told with such flavor and ferocity in his popular novel, 'The Brave Bulls,' has been brought to the screen with all the richness and vitality of the book in Robert Rossen's brilliant translation, which arrived at the Rivoli yesterday. Here, at last, is a picture that captures in its raw and savage power the full fascination and repulsion of bull-fighting in the lives of men."
