= The Fugitive (1947 film) =

1947 film directed by John Ford

- Directed by: John Ford
- Written by: Dudley Nichols
- Based on: The Power and the Glory; 1940 novel by Graham Greene
- Produced by: Merian C. Cooper; Emilio Fernández; John Ford
- Starring: Henry Fonda; Dolores del Río; Pedro Armendáriz
- Cinematography: Gabriel Figueroa
- Edited by: Jack Murray
- Music by: Richard Hageman
- Production company: Argosy Pictures
- Distributed by: RKO Radio Pictures; Estudios Churubusco
- Release date: November 3, 1947
- Running time: 104 minutes
- Countries: United States; Mexico
- Language: English
- Budget: $1.5 million

The Fugitive is a 1947 American drama film, starring Henry Fonda and directed by John Ford, based on the 1940 novel The Power and the Glory, by Graham Greene. The film was shot on location in Mexico.

== Plot ==
A nameless and conflicted Catholic priest is a fugitive in an unnamed Latin American country, where the Catholic Church has been outlawed. (This actually happened in Mexico in 1926, sparking the brutal and bloody civil war known as the Cristero War, the basis of the film and the novel it is based on.) We see a brutal attack on a rural village by troops commanded by a militant-atheist police lieutenant, during which the fugitive priest is present but is hidden by the devout villagers. The viewer learns through dialogue that he is the last priest in the country, the others having been driven out on pain of death (just as in Mexico in the 1920s), but he stayed because he thought he had more time to escape than he actually did, so he becomes a fugitive. When he finally does try to escape, his efforts are thwarted by a crazy, greedy Native and other circumstances. The priest has to return to his village, where, in the ruined and desecrated village church, he meets a beautiful outcast Indian woman, Maria Dolores, who wants her illegitimate baby baptized. When the priest grants her plea, it generates in her a powerful feeling of loyalty and gratitude to him. Another fugitive, a murderous North American bandit dubbed "El Gringo," has already arrived in town. The crazy Native and the police troops soon follow. While Maria Dolores distracts the policemen, the priest escapes. As he escapes, the bandit "El Gringo" holds off the police troops in a gun battle in which he is badly wounded. The devoted and devout Maria Dolores leads the fugitive priest to safety in another town.

In that other town, the priest finds sanctuary, but the crazy Native (a Judas Iscariot-type character) tracks him down and tells him that "El Gringo" is dying and that the priest must go to him to administer the last rites. He is in fact dying, but refuses the Last Rites. Of course, it was a trap by the crazy Native "Judas" and the police lieutenant who has been hunting him from the beginning. The priest is captured and sentenced to death, but he forgives the informant for betraying him. The priest's execution by firing squad brings an outpouring of public grief and shows the authorities that it is impossible to stamp out Catholicism as long as it lives in people's hearts and minds. Even the police lieutenant acknowledges his own faith, albeit secretly.

In the final scene, numerous people are praying in secret when there is a knock at the door. A man stands at the door, announcing that he is the new priest for the village.

== Cast ==
- Henry Fonda as Fugitive priest
- Dolores del Río as Maria Dolores
- Pedro Armendáriz as Police lieutenant
- J. Carrol Naish as Police informer
- Leo Carrillo as Chief of police
- Ward Bond as James "El Gringo" Calvary
- Robert Armstrong as Police sergeant
- Rodolfo Acosta as Policeman (uncredited)
- Mel Ferrer as Father Serra (uncredited)

== Production ==
An international co-production between the United States and Mexico. The Fugitive was filmed on location in Taxco de Alarcón, Cholula, Cuernavaca, and the Churubusco Studios in Mexico City. It was the first collaboration between RKO and Ford-Cooper's company Argosy Pictures, the deal was for Argosy to produce three pictures that RKO should distribute and they would share the costs, and benefits fifty-fifty, while retaining creative control.

With the exception of two assistant directors and an editor, the entire crew was Mexican; about it, Ford said it ran "neck and neck with the best... in Hollywood."

John Ford was helped by Mexican director Emilio Fernández, who served as an associate producer of the film. He introduced Ford to Dolores del Río, Pedro Armendáriz and cinematographer Gabriel Figueroa (all people Fernández had previously worked with). About Figueroa's work, Ford said: "It had a lot of damn good photography –- with those black and white shadows, [...] We had a good cameraman, Gabriel Figueroa, and we'd wait for the light – instead of the way it is nowadays, where regardless of the light, you shoot."

== Reception ==
Tag Gallagher has written an extended discussion of the film in his book, John Ford: The Man and His Films (1986). He summarizes The Fugitive and its place in Ford's career as follows: "once in Mexico, Ford jettisoned most of the script and, giving leave to his fancy, made a highly abstract art film. The Fugitive lost considerable money, caused a rift between [writer Dudley] Nichols and Ford, and has posed problems even for Ford's most devoted followers. Only the director himself consistently defended it. 'I just enjoy looking at it.' 'To me, it was perfect.' And in terms of composition, lighting and editing, The Fugitive may be among the most enjoyable pictures."

Bret Wood has written: "Ford is best remembered today for his boisterous adventure films, such as The Quiet Man (1952), The Searchers (1956) or She Wore a Yellow Ribbon (1949); and for his crusty, unpretentious demeanor, often denying the existence of thematic subtext in his work and refusing to discuss his artistic intentions as a director. But The Fugitive belongs to an earlier, lesser known faction of his work, self-consciously 'arty' films that demonstrated his interests in German expressionism, English literature and religious ideology. Films such as The Informer (1935), The Prisoner of Shark Island (1936) or The Long Voyage Home (1940), remind us that beneath Ford's growling machismo were a sophisticated mind and a brilliant visual sense, even though Ford was later to deny both gifts ('I make Westerns' is how he typically summarized his career). The Fugitive is perhaps Ford's last great 'art film', a high-minded show of faith, a lovingly crafted paean to his own Catholicism."

== Accolades ==
The film gained the prize of the International Catholic Organization for Cinema (OCIC), at the Venice Film Festival in 1948. According to this jury, this was a film "most capable of contributing to the revival of moral and spiritual values of humanity". OCIC critic Johanes added to this that The Fugitive "excelled in plastic perfection. On the other hand, its very excess of pictorial splendour was a fault of the John Ford-Figueroa production. The drama of the priest, as related by Graham Greene, lost in profundity what it gained in external splendour. We all know the definition of this award; for the production that has made the greatest contribution to the moral and spiritual betterment of humanity. It differs from the other awards, which are normally given for artistic merit. Art for Art's sake is not the object, but rather art for the sake of man, the whole of man, heart and soul. Pious dullness is not the aim."

== See also ==
- List of American films of 1947
