= The Girl of the Limberlost =

1945 film directed by Mel Ferrer

- Theatrical poster for the film
- Directed by: Mel Ferrer (as Melchor G. Ferrer)
- Written by: Erna Lazarus
- Based on: A Girl of the Limberlost by Gene Stratton-Porter
- Produced by: Alexis Thurn-Taxis
- Starring: Ruth Nelson; Dorinda Clifton; Loren Tindall
- Cinematography: Burnett Guffey
- Edited by: Al Clark
- Music by: Mischa Bakaleinikoff
- Production company: Columbia Pictures
- Release date: October 11, 1945 (US)
- Running time: 60 minutes
- Country: United States
- Language: English

The Girl of the Limberlost is a 1945 American drama film starring Ruth Nelson, Dorinda Clifton, and Loren Tindall, and directed by Mel Ferrer. The film is based on a 1909 novel by Gene Stratton-Porter. The film was also adapted in 1924 and 1934 as "A Girl of the Limberlost".

The movie is set in Indiana's famous Limberlost Swamp, which was clear-cut, drained and turned into farmland in the early 20th century, despite efforts by Stratton-Porter and others to save it. A small part of the original swamp has been restored since the 1990s and is now a nature preserve.

== Cast ==
- Ruth Nelson as Kate Comstock
- Dorinda Clifton as Elnora Comstock
- Loren Tindall as Pete Reed
- Gloria Holden as Miss Nelson
- Ernest Cossart as Roger Henley
- Vanessa Brown as Helen Brownlee
- James Bell as Wesley Sinton
- Joyce Arling as Margaret Sinton
- Charles Arnt as Hodges
- Warren Mills as Chester Hepple
- Gloria Patrice as Amy Thurston
- Lillian Bronson as Miss Blodgett
- Peggy Converse as Jessie Reed
- Jimmy Clark as Bob Stewart
- Carol Morris as Carrie
