= The Naked Dawn =

1955 film

- Theatrical release poster
- Directed by: Edgar G. Ulmer
- Written by: Julian Zimet
- Produced by: Josef Shaftel
- Starring: Arthur Kennedy; Betta St. John
- Cinematography: Frederick Gately
- Edited by: Dan Milner
- Music by: Herschel Burke Gilbert
- Production company: Universal Pictures
- Distributed by: Universal Pictures
- Release dates: November 2, 1955 (Los Angeles); December 27, 1955 (United States)
- Running time: 82 minutes
- Country: United States
- Language: English

The Naked Dawn is a 1955 American Technicolor Western film directed by Edgar G. Ulmer starring Arthur Kennedy and Betta St. John.

== Plot ==
The story focuses on a poor but proud farmer named Manuel and his wife Maria. When glib-tongued drifter Santiago tries to get Manuel mixed up in a robbery, the farmer is at first resistant, but is goaded into joining Santiago. Corrupted by the prospect of untold wealth, Manuel begins plotting the murder of Santiago; meanwhile, Maria makes plans to run off with the handsome stranger.

== Cast ==
- Arthur Kennedy as Santiago
- Betta St. John as Maria Lopez
- Eugene Iglesias as Manuel Lopez
- Charlita as Tita
- Roy Engel as Guntz
- Tony Martinez as Vicente
- Francis McDonald as Railroad guard

== Additional information ==
- Shot in ten days.
- François Truffaut cited this film as an inspiration for the characters in Jules and Jim.

== See also ==
- List of American films of 1955
