= Willy Tappolet =

Swiss musicologist (1890–1981)

- Born: 6 August 1890; Lindau, Switzerland
- Died: 24 February 1981 (aged 90); Geneva, Switzerland
- Occupations: Musicologist, music critic
- Spouse: Martha Huggenberg

Willy Tappolet (6 August 1890 – 24 February 1981) was a Swiss musicologist and music critic, a co-founder of the chair of musicology at the University of Geneva.

== Biography ==
Tappolet was the son of August Heinrich, a pastor, and of Maria Hedwig Rohr. In 1920 he married Martha Huggenberg. He studied German and Romance literatures, the history of music, and psychology at Montpellier, Berlin, and Zürich (doctorate at Zürich in 1917), and completed his habilitation at Geneva with a work on musical notation and its influence on the practice of music from the Middle Ages to the 20th century (1938).

A co-founder of the chair of musicology at the University of Geneva (1949), Tappolet was an associate professor there from 1955. Alongside his scholarly activity, which focused above all on the history of Swiss music in the 20th century and on musical life in French-speaking Switzerland, he was a music critic for the Revue musicale suisse and the Neue Zürcher Zeitung, and a member of the committees of the Geneva conservatory (1925–1935) and of the Orchestre de la Suisse Romande (1922–1935).

== Works ==
- Maurice Ravel, 1950
- Arthur Honegger, 1957 (German edition 1933)
- Begegnungen mit der Musik in Goethes Leben und Werk, 1975

== Bibliography ==
- Die Musik in Geschichte und Gegenwart, 16, 1979, 500
