= Eugene Iglesias =

Puerto Rican actor (1926–2023)

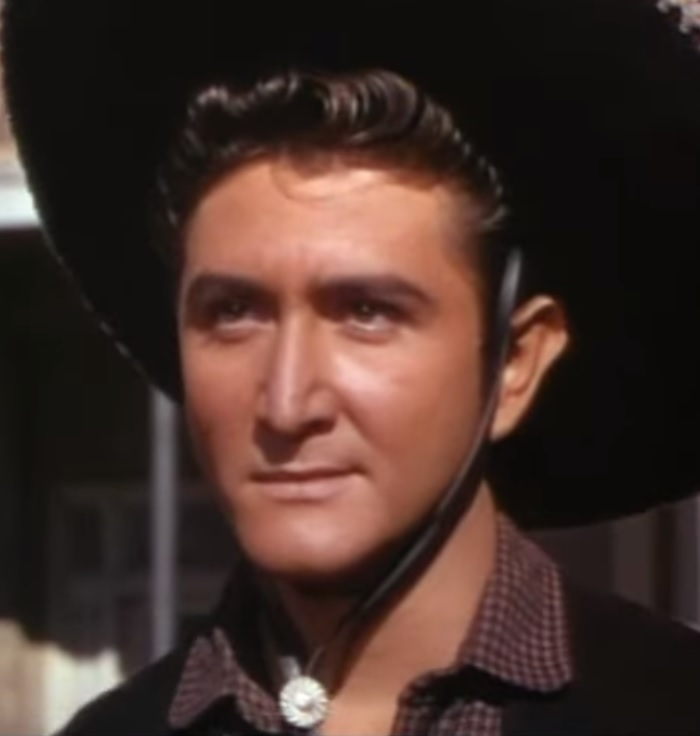
- Born: December 3, 1926; San Juan, Puerto Rico
- Died: February 4, 2023 (aged 96); Lamesa, Texas, U.S.
- Occupation: Actor
- Years active: 1951–1970

Eugene Luis Francisco Iglesias Carrillo (December 3, 1926 – February 4, 2023) was an American actor from Puerto Rico who was active mainly in the 1950s and 1960s. His films include The Naked Dawn (1955), Cowboy (1958), and Harper (1966). He also appeared in television series such as My Little Margie and Dragnet.

== Entertainment career ==
Iglesias was born in San Juan to Eugenio Iglesias de la Cruz and Gloria Carrillo Maldonado. Iglesias was born into a family of lawyers, of which some had served as judges in Puerto Rico. He began his career as a child actor in Puerto Rico. His artistic inclinations became apparent while attending Goyco School at the age of nine as part of the "Noches Culturales" initiatives. . While attending Central High, Iglesias was mentored by Pilar García and Carmen Marrero. Iglesias was discovered by producer Leopoldo Santiago Lavandero, who scouted for talent while he was performing at Central High. He participated with traveling theater groups in Puerto Rico, New York and Mexico. At New York, he met José Ferrer, who served as a mentor to him. Both interpreted Puerto Rican poetry at the Carnegie Hall. Eventually, Ferrer helped him get a space in Hollywood.

Santiago hired him for a role in the University of Puerto Rico, which extended from seven months to six full years and included Prohibido suicidarse en la primavera, Seis personajes en búsqueda de un actor and plays by Chekhov. . During this time, he joined other students in the radio programs that the former directed. In 1946, Iglesias joined Universidad Nacional Autónoma, where he organized three events on Luis Pales Matos' poetry. It was there that he joined fellow Puerto Ricans Mapy and Fernando Cortés in Mexican cinema. From there, Iglesias returned to Puerto Rico. After enrolling at Columbia University (arriving there with $100), Iglesias joined theater group Chenser Players. It was performing for them that he met José Ferrer. The established Puerto Rican actor invited him to join his group.

Ferrer was responsible for Iglesias joined Columbia Studies, after informing him that there were auditions for The Brave Bulls. The studio first considered him for the role of "Yank" before moving him to that of "Pepe Bello". For this part, he received bullfighting classes. For his performance in this film, Iglesias was nominated by Foreign Press and mayor Felisa Rincón de Gautier granted him the Key to San Juan for a second time. In 1950, Columbia contracted Iglesias to a seven-year contract. Throughout the decade, he appeared in 65 films including The Brave Bulls (1951), The Naked Down (1955), War Cry Jaka: Indian Upbringing (1952), The Mask of the Avenger (1951) and East of Sumatra (1953).

For The Money Trap, Iglesias returned to his native Puerto Rico to film scenes in the island municipality of Vieques. While contracted to Columbia Studios, Iglesias was forced to use dark makeup and black wigs to fill the roles that were usually given to Latin Americans. Iglesias refused to change his name to an English variant, despite knowing that this limited his roles. He did, however, take English fiction classes to reduce his accent. During his tenure with the studio, he completed his education at Columbia University. Iglesias later reunited with Fernando Cortés in Posada del caballo blanco. He stated that of all the films he participated in, his favorite was The Naked Dawn.

== Later life ==
After retiring, Iglesias traveled throughout the world along with his parents, during which he gathered paintings. He became a dedicated art collector, beginning with modern and romantic pieces. Afterwards, Iglesias gathered 19th Century paintings and sculptures, in a collection that was claimed to have been the largest in the Western United States. He also acquired other paintings, which he occasionally sold. Iglesias purchased Myrna Loy's House at Hollywood Hills. After retiring from Hollywood, Iglesias withdrew from public life, at one point spending 30 years without granting an interview.

== Death ==
Iglesias died from a heart attack in Lamesa, Texas, on February 4, 2023, at the age of 96, and was buried at Hollywood Forever Cemetery in Los Angeles, California.

== Filmography ==
Year	Title	Role	Notes
1951	The Brave Bulls	Pepe Bello	
1951	Mask of the Avenger	Rollo D'Anterras	
1952	Indian Uprising	Sergeant Ramirez	
1952	California Conquest	José Martínez	
1952	Duel at Silver Creek	Johnny Sombrero	
1952	Hiawatha	Chibiabos	
1953	Jack McCall, Desperado	Grey Eagle	
1953	East of Sumatra	Paulo	
1953	Tumbleweed	Tigre	
1954	Taza, Son of Cochise	Chato	
1954	They Rode West	Red Leaf	
1955	Underwater!	Miguel Vega	
1955	The Naked Dawn	Manuel Lopez	
1956	Walk the Proud Land	Chato	
1957	Domino Kid	Juan Cortez	
1958	Cowboy	Don Manuel Arriega	
1959	Rio Bravo	1st Burdette Man in Shootout	Uncredited
1959	The Untouchables	Tony Cestari	Episode: "The Artichoke King"
1959	Frontier Doctor	David Lanyon	Episode: "Superstition Mountain"
1960	Key Witness	Emelio Sanchez	Uncredited
1961	Peter Gunn	Vicente Alvarez	Episode: "Cry Love, Cry Murder"
1961	Frontier Uprising	Lieutenant Ruiz	
1962	Safe at Home!	Mr. Torres	
1963	The Alfred Hitchcock Hour	Pedro Sanchez	Season 1 Episode 29: "The Dark Pool"
1964	Apache Rifles	Corporal Ramirez	
1965	The Money Trap	Father	
1966	Harper	Felix	
1966	The Wild Wild West	Galito	Episode: "The Night of the Poisonous Posey"
1967	Combat!	Kako	Episode: "Gadjo"
1969	The Wild Wild West	Bernal	Episode: "The Night of the Pistoleros"
