= El Greco (1966 film) =

1966 film

- Film poster
- Directed by: Luciano Salce
- Written by: Guy Elmes; Massimo Franciosa; Juan García Atienza; Luigi Magni
- Produced by: Alfredo Bini; Mel Ferrer
- Starring: Mel Ferrer
- Cinematography: Leonida Barboni
- Edited by: Nino Baragli
- Music by: Ennio Morricone
- Production company: Arco Film
- Distributed by: 20th Century Fox
- Release dates: 7 May 1966 (Premiere); 15 August 1966 (Italy)
- Running time: 95 minutes
- Countries: Italy; Spain; France
- Language: Italian
- Budget: $800,000

El Greco is a 1966 Italian drama film and biography of the painter El Greco directed by Luciano Salce and starring Mel Ferrer and Rosanna Schiaffino.

== Cast ==
- Mel Ferrer as El Greco (Domenico Teotocopulo)
- Rosanna Schiaffino as Jeronima de las Cuevas
- Adolfo Celi as Don Miguel de las Cuevas
- Mario Feliciani as Nino de Guevara
- Franco Giacobini as Francisco
- Renzo Giovampietro as Brother Felix
- Ángel Aranda as Don Luis
- Nino Crisman as Diego de Castillo
- Gabriella Giorgelli as Maria
- Giulio Donnini as Pignatelli
- Fernando Rey as Philip II
- Rafael Rivelles as Marquis of Villena
- John Karlsen as Prosecutor
- John Francis Lane as De Agueda
- Rossana Martini as Zaida

== Production ==
It was Mel Ferrer's first film as producer. According to Ferrer, the film cost $800,000 which he felt was modest considering the film was in color and was the first movie allowed to shoot at Toledo Cathedral.

== Release ==
The film had its world premiere on 7 May 1966 at the Museum of Santa Cruz in Toledo, Spain.

== Reception ==
According to Fox records, the film needed to earn $1,300,000 in rentals to break even and made $1,675,000, meaning it made a profit.
