= Sean Hepburn Ferrer =

American film producer and author (born 1960)

- Born: July 17, 1960 (age 66); Lucerne, Switzerland
- Citizenship: United States
- Occupations: Film producer; author
- Spouse: Karin Hepburn Ferrer
- Children: 3, including Emma Ferrer
- Parents: Mel Ferrer (father); Audrey Hepburn (mother)

Sean Hepburn Ferrer (born 17 July 1960) is an American film producer and author. He is the son of Audrey Hepburn and Mel Ferrer.

== Early life ==
Sean Hepburn Ferrer is the son of Audrey Hepburn and her first husband Mel Ferrer. Ferrer was born in Lucerne, Switzerland, and has spent periods of his life in Italy and Spain. He has a half-brother, Luca Dotti, from Hepburn's second marriage to Italian psychiatrist Andrea Dotti.

After the birth of Sean, his mother turned away from the Hollywood life to focus on raising her children.

== Career ==
He worked in the film industry for several years in the development, production and marketing of films. He has also been an assistant director on several film projects. In 2001, he filmed the documentary Racehoss about Albert Race Sample, who, as a convicted criminal in prison, turned to writing and later helped other inmates to return to normal living. Ferrer directed and produced the film. In 2003, he published a biography of his mother, Audrey Hepburn, an Elegant Spirit. In 2020, he and his wife, Karin, published Little Audrey's Daydream, a children's book about Hepburn's childhood in Europe. Proceeds from the book benefit the European Organisation for Rare Diseases. Ferrer and his daughter, Emma, contributed to Audrey (2020), a documentary about his mother directed by Helena Coan.

== Charity work ==
=== Audrey Hepburn Children's Fund ===
A year after his mother's death in 1993, Ferrer founded the Audrey Hepburn Children's Fund (originally named Hollywood for Children Inc.), a charity funded by exhibitions of Audrey Hepburn memorabilia. He directed the charity in cooperation with his half-brother Luca Dotti, and Robert Wolders, his mother's partner, which aimed to continue the humanitarian work of Audrey Hepburn. Ferrer brought the exhibition "Timeless Audrey" on a world tour to raise money for the foundation. He served as chairman of the fund before resigning in 2012, turning over the position to Dotti. In 2017, Ferrer was sued by the fund for alleged self-serving conduct. In October 2017, Ferrer responded by suing the fund for trademark infringement, claiming that the fund no longer had the right to use Hepburn's name or likeness. Ferrer's suit against the fund was dismissed in March 2018 due to the complaint's failure to include Dotti as a defendant. In 2019, the court sided with Ferrer, with the judge ruling that the charity could not utilize Hepburn's image without the consent of both Ferrer and Dotti.

=== Other ventures ===
From 2014 to 2018, Ferrer was ambassador of the annual Rare Disease Days.

== Personal life ==
Ferrer is married to Karin Hepburn Ferrer (formerly Karin Hofer). He is the godfather of Pierluigi Christophe Orunesu.

== Selected filmography ==
- 1981: Inchon (Assistant Director)
- 1982: One Shoe Makes It Murder (Second Assistant Director)
- 1983: Strangers Kiss (Associate Producer, First Assistant Director)
- 1984: Growing Pains (Second Assistant Director)
- 1986: Good to Go (Producer)
- 1987: Treasure of the Moon Goddess (Assistant Director)
- 1987: Ironweed (Associate Producer)
- 1991: Eye of the Widow (Executive Producer, First Assistant Director)
- 1991: Pretty Hattie's Baby (Producer)
- 1993: Blood In Blood Out (Bound by Honor, First Assistant Director)
- 2001: Racehoss (Producer, Director)
- 2010: Living the Blues (Short, Executive Producer)
- 2011: Cloudstreet (3-episode miniseries, Executive Producer)

== Publications ==
- Hepburn Ferrer, Sean (2003). Audrey Hepburn, An Elegant Spirit: A Son Remembers (1st ed.). New York: Atria Books. ISBN 978-0-6710-2478-9.
- Hepburn Ferrer, Sean; Hepburn Ferrer, Karin (2020). Little Audrey's Daydream. New York: Princeton Architectural Press. ISBN 978-1-6168-9991-2.
- Hepburn Ferrer, Sean; Holden, Wendy (2026). Intimate Audrey: An Authorized Biography. New York: Grand Central Publishing. ISBN 978-1-5387-7507-3.
