= Proibito =

1954 film

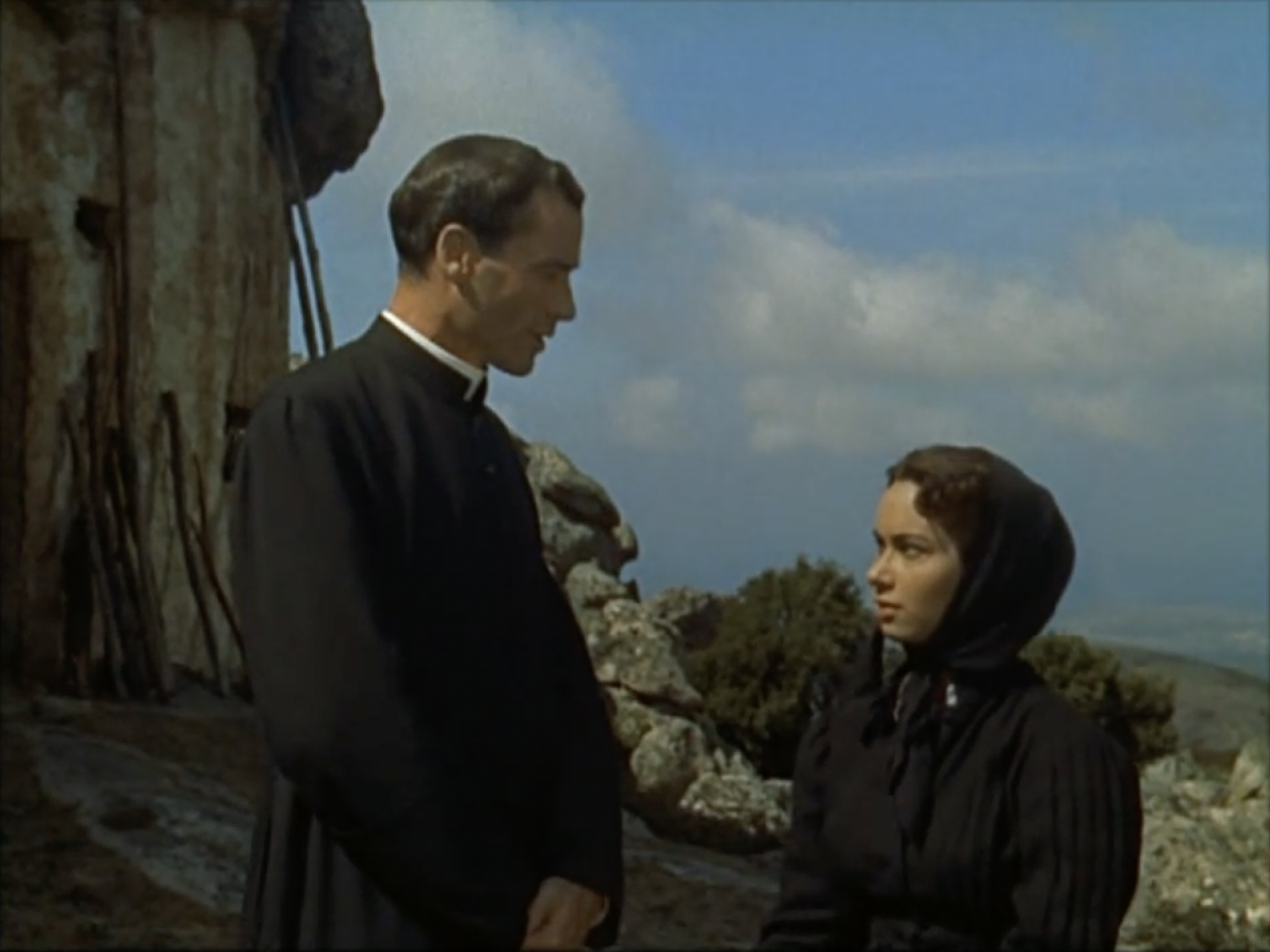
- Ferrer and Massari in a film scene
- Directed by: Mario Monicelli
- Written by: Suso Cecchi d'Amico; Mario Monicelli; Grazia Deledda; Giuseppe Mangione
- Produced by: Jacques Bar
- Starring: Mel Ferrer
- Cinematography: Aldo Tonti
- Edited by: Adriana Novelli
- Music by: Nino Rota
- Release date: 30 December 1954
- Running time: 100 minutes
- Country: Italy
- Language: Italian

Proibito (English: Forbidden) is a 1954 Italian drama film directed by Mario Monicelli and starring Mel Ferrer.

== Cast ==
- Mel Ferrer as Don Paolo Solinas
- Amedeo Nazzari as Costantino Corraine
- Lea Massari as Agnese Barras
- Henri Vilbert as Niccodemo Barras
- Germaine Kerjean as Maddalena Solinas
- Paolo Ferrara as Maresciallo Taddei
- Eduardo Ciannelli as Vescovo
- Decimo Cristiani as Antonio
- Ornella Spegni as La vedova Casu
- Memmo Luisi as Antioco
- Marco Guglielmi as Mareddu
