= Emma Ferrer =

American artist and former model (born 1994)

- Born: Emma Kathleen Hepburn Ferrer; June 1994 (age 32); Morges, Switzerland
- Education: International School of Florence; Florence Academy of Art
- Occupations: Model, artist
- Parent(s): Sean Hepburn Ferrer; Leila Flannigan
- Relatives: Audrey Hepburn (paternal grandmother); Mel Ferrer (paternal grandfather)

Emma Kathleen Hepburn Ferrer (born in June 1994) is an American artist and former model.

== Early life ==
Ferrer was born in June 1994, in Morges, Switzerland, the daughter of producer Sean Hepburn Ferrer and Leila Flanagan. She is the granddaughter of actors Audrey Hepburn and Mel Ferrer. Her parents divorced when she was 6 years old. She has two younger half-siblings. Ferrer spent her childhood in Los Angeles and Florence, and briefly attended Crossroads School for Arts & Sciences. She previously studied ballet. She earned a degree from Italy's Florence Academy of Art.

== Career ==
Ferrer made her magazine modeling debut on the cover of Harper's Bazaar September 2014 issue, and was signed by Storm Management. She played a supporting role in the feature film The Man in the Attic, a psychological thriller directed by Constantine Venetopoulos, released in 2019. Ferrer and her father both contributed to Audrey (2020), a documentary about her grandmother directed by Helena Coan.

Ferrer lived in New York City for 6 years from 2015-2019, where she worked as an art liaison and curator.

Ferrer currently resides in Italy since 2019 where she works as a professional artist.

== Charity work ==
Ferrer is a spokesperson for UNICEF, and a UNHCR Ambassador to the United States. In December 2018, Ferrer was the keynote speaker at a UNICEF ball, in a continuation of her grandmother's work with the organization. Ferrer does counseling work with female detainees at Rikers Island.

== Style and works ==
Ferrer is a multi-material artist painting in both watercolor and oil as well as sculptural works in bronze, resin, and ceramics. According to Ferrer, her style is influenced heavily by her residence in the Italian mountains and can be described as "impressionistic".
