= John Loring (designer) =

American art historian (1939–2026)

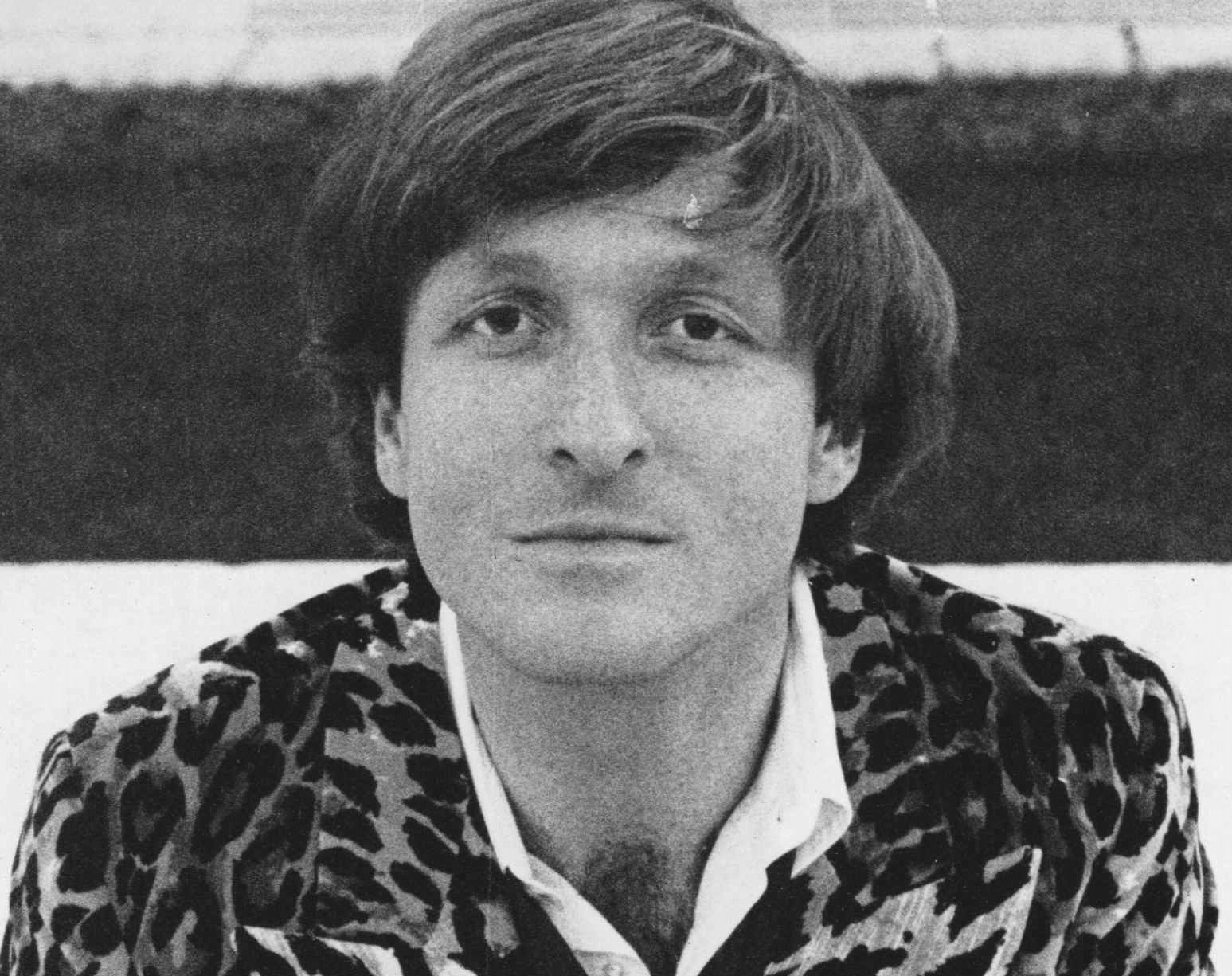
- Loring in 1968
- Born: John Robbins Loring; November 23, 1939; Chicago, Illinois, U.S.
- Died: June 6, 2026 (aged 86); Palm Beach, Florida, U.S.
- Education: Yale University 1960; Académie royale de peinture et de sculpture 1960-1964, (Ecole Beaux Arts de Paris)
- Occupations: Design director of Tiffany & Co., artist, printmaker, author, photographer

John Robbins Loring (November 23, 1939 – June 6, 2026) was an American fashion design director and art historian. He was latterly design director emeritus of Tiffany & Co., where he had been design director from 1979 to 2009. He is the author of numerous books about Tiffany's and art in general and was a longtime contributor to Architectural Digest.

== Life and career ==
John Loring was born in Chicago, Illinois, on November 23, 1939.

Prior to joining Tiffany in 1979 as design director, Loring was the New York bureau chief of Architectural Digest, as well as having been one of the magazine's principal editorial contributors. In 1977 he was a distinguished visiting professor at the University of California Davis.

Loring earned a Bachelor of Arts degree in English literature from Yale University in 1960. After graduating, he continued his studies for four more years at the Ecole des Beaux Arts in Paris. Since 1964, his prints and paintings have been exhibited in Europe and the United States.

He continued to write on art and design. He served on the Acquisitions Committee of The Museum of Modern Art's Department of Prints and Illustrated Books. He was also a serious collector of 20th-century furniture and ceramics. His interests in cooking and interior design have been recognized in major publications, including The New York Times Magazine, Bon Appetit, Food and Wine, Architectural Digest, House & Garden, L’Oeil, Arbitare, GQ, House Beautiful, Metropolitan Home, Gala, The New Yorker, and French Vogue. He was featured in a profile in The New Yorker's August 10, 1992, issue.

In a foreword to Loring's 2011 photography book Christian Lost or Found, photojournalist Harry Benson praises his friend: "With every project he tackles, John Loring's instinctive brilliance produces a little magic, and he has one of the best eyes for photography in the world. You cannot but linger over his photographs – You find there a haunting elegance that stays with you."

Loring died in Palm Beach, Florida, on June 6, 2026, at the age of 86.

== Works ==
Public displays of Loring's work include at the Alexander Hamilton U.S. Custom House in New York City; the Prudential Life Institution Co. of America Eastern home office in Woodbridge, Nee Jersey; in the City of Scranton, Pennsylvania; Western Savings in Philadelphia; and at Tivoli Gardens in Copenhagen. Loring's work is part of the permanent collections of numerous museums, including:

- Museum of Modern Art
- Whitney Museum of American Art
- Metropolitan Museum of Art
- Art Institute of Chicago
- Museum of Fine Arts, Boston
- Yale University Art Gallery
- Dallas Museum of Art

Venues for one-man shows of his work have included the Baltimore Museum of Art, 1972; Hundred Acres Gallery in Nee York, 1972; Pace Editions, 1973, 1977; the Long Beach Museum of Art in 1975; A.D.I. Gallery in San Francisco in 1976; the Holden Luntz Gallery, in Palm Beach, Florida in 2011; and the Sarah Gavlak Gallery in 2012. His works have been exhibited in group shows at the Philadelphia Museum of Art, in 1971; the New York Cultural Centre, in 1972; Biennale Graphic Art in Ljubljana, Yugoslavia, in 1973 and again in 1977; at Intergrafia, Kraków, Poland in 1974; the Art Institute of Chicago in 1975, and at the Rhode Island School of Design in Providence, Rhode Island, in 1976.

== Bibliography ==
- Tiffany Time . New York: Abrams, 2015
- Christian Lost or Found. Brooklyn, New York: powerHouse Books, 2011
- Joseph Urban. New York: Abrams, 2010
- Tiffany Style: 170 Years of Design. New York: Abrams, 2008
- Tiffany Colored Gems. New York: Abrams, 2007
- Tiffany Pearls. New York: Abrams, 2006
- Tiffany Diamonds. New York: Abrams, 2005
- Tiffany's Palm Beach. New York: Abrams, 2005
- Greetings from Andy Warhol: Christmas at Tiffany's. New York: Abrams, 2004
- Tiffany Timepieces. New York: Abrams, 2004
- Tiffany in Fashion. New York: Abrams, 2003
- Tiffany Flora and Fauna. New York: Abrams, 2003
- Louis Comfort Tiffany at Tiffany & Co.. New York: Abrams, 2002
- Magnificent Tiffany Silver. New York: Abrams, 2001
- Paulding Farnham: Tiffany's Lost Genius. New York: Abrams, 2000
- Tiffany Jewels. New York: Abrams, 1999
- Tiffany's 20th Century: A Portrait of American Style. New York: Abrams, 1997
- A Tiffany Christmas. New York: Doubleday, 1996
- The Tiffany Gourmet Cookbook. New York: Doubleday, 1992
- Tiffany Parties. New York: Doubleday, 1989
- The Tiffany Wedding. New York: Doubleday, 1988
- Tiffany's 150 Years. New York: Doubleday, 1987
- Tiffany Taste. New York: Doubleday, 1986
- The New Tiffany Tablesettings. New York: Doubleday, 1981

== Awards ==
- 2010 – Artistic Achievement award, American Cancer Society
- 2005 – Lifetime Achievement award, Museum of Art and Design, NYC
- 2004 – Dallas Fashion award
- 2002 – Pratt Legends award
- 1996 – Honorary Doctor in Arts degree from Pratt Institute
- 1996 – Distinction in Design award from Fashion Group International.
- 1988 – Design and Art Society's Edith Wharton Award for Excellence
