= Orchestre de la Suisse Romande =

Swiss symphony orchestra

Orchestre de la Suisse Romande (OSR)
- Orchestra
- Official logo
- Founded: 1918; 108 years ago
- Location: Geneva, Switzerland
- Concert hall: Victoria Hall
- Principal conductor: Tugan Sokhiev
- Website: Official website

The Orchestre de la Suisse Romande (OSR) is a Swiss symphony orchestra, based in Geneva at the Victoria Hall. In addition to symphony concerts, the OSR performs as the opera orchestra in productions at the Grand Théâtre de Genève.

== History ==
Ernest Ansermet founded the OSR in 1918, together with Paul Lachenal, with a contingent of 48 players and a season of six months' duration. Besides Swiss musicians, the OSR players initially came from other countries, including Austria, France, Germany and Italy. Ansermet gradually increased the percentage of Swiss musicians in the orchestra, attaining 80% Swiss personnel by 1946. He remained the music director of the OSR for 49 years, from 1918 to 1967.

A Swiss radio orchestra based in Lausanne was merged into the OSR in 1938. Subsequently, the OSR began to broadcast radio concerts regularly on Swiss radio. The orchestra had a long-standing contract for recordings with Decca Records, dating from the tenure of Ansermet, and made over 300 recordings for Decca, starting in 1947 with Debussy's La mer. The OSR premiered many works of the Swiss composers Arthur Honegger and Frank Martin. During the directorship of Armin Jordan (1985–1997), the OSR continued to make recordings on the Erato label.

From 2005 to 2012, Marek Janowski was the artistic director and music director of the OSR. He conducted the OSR in recordings for the Pentatone label. In September 2008, his initial 5-year contract had been extended to 2015, but in January 2010, in a change to the September 2008 contract extension, Janowski and the OSR mutually agreed on the scheduled conclusion of his directorship of the OSR after the 2011–12 season.

Following the announcement of Janowski's scheduled 2012 departure, attempts to secure Bertrand de Billy and Kazuki Yamada as the OSR's next artistic leader did not come to fruition. In September 2010, the OSR named Neeme Järvi as its ninth artistic and musical director, and in parallel, Yamada as principal guest conductor, with both appointments effective as of 2012, with initial contracts of 3 years for both conductors. Järvi has commercially recorded with the OSR for the Chandos label. He concluded his OSR directorship after the 2014–2015 season.

Jonathan Nott first guest-conducted the OSR in October 2014. Following these concert appearances, in January 2015, the OSR named Nott its next music and artistic director, effective January 2017. The OSR formalised the new contract and relationship with Nott in March 2016. In February 2021, the OSR announced the conversion of Nott's OSR contract into an evergreen, open-ended lifetime agreement with no set final date. According to news reports in 2023 of a revised contract end date of 2026 for Nott's OSR contract, Nott had been scheduled to conclude his OSR tenure at the close of the 2025–2026 season. Nott formally concluded his OSR tenure in December 2025.

In 2024, Tugan Sokhiev first guest-conducted the OSR. He returned for an additional guest-conducting engagement in October 2025. In June 2026, the OSR announced the appointment of Sokhiev as its next principal conductor and artistic advisor, effective with the 2026–2027 season, with an initial contract of three seasons.

=== Digital collaborations ===
In 2023, Pierluigi Christophe Orunesu's company Cyber'Art developed the 'icologram' initiative, a digital startup enabling virtual artist presence, and collaborated with the OSR to record the first holographic symphonic performance presented at Artgenève 2024. In 2025, the OSR unveiled 'Virtual Hall', an immersive virtual reality platform also developed with Cybel'Art, to offer 360-degree video and spatial audio from multiple stage perspectives, conceptualised by Orunesu and premiered at Artgenève 2025.

== Artistic and musical directors ==
- Ernest Ansermet (1918–1967)
- Paul Kletzki (1967–1970)
- Wolfgang Sawallisch (1970–1980)
- Horst Stein (1980–1985)
- Armin Jordan (1985–1997)
- Fabio Luisi (1997–2002)
- Pinchas Steinberg (2002–2005)
- Marek Janowski (2005–2012)
- Neeme Järvi (2012–2015)
- Jonathan Nott (2017–2025)
- Tugan Sokhiev (2026–present)
