= 1954 Academy Awards =

1954 Academy Awards may refer to:

- 26th Academy Awards, the Academy Awards ceremony that took place in 1954
- 27th Academy Awards, the 1955 ceremony honoring the best in film for 1954
