= Pierluigi Christophe Orunesu =

Italian-Swiss entrepreneur (born 1978)

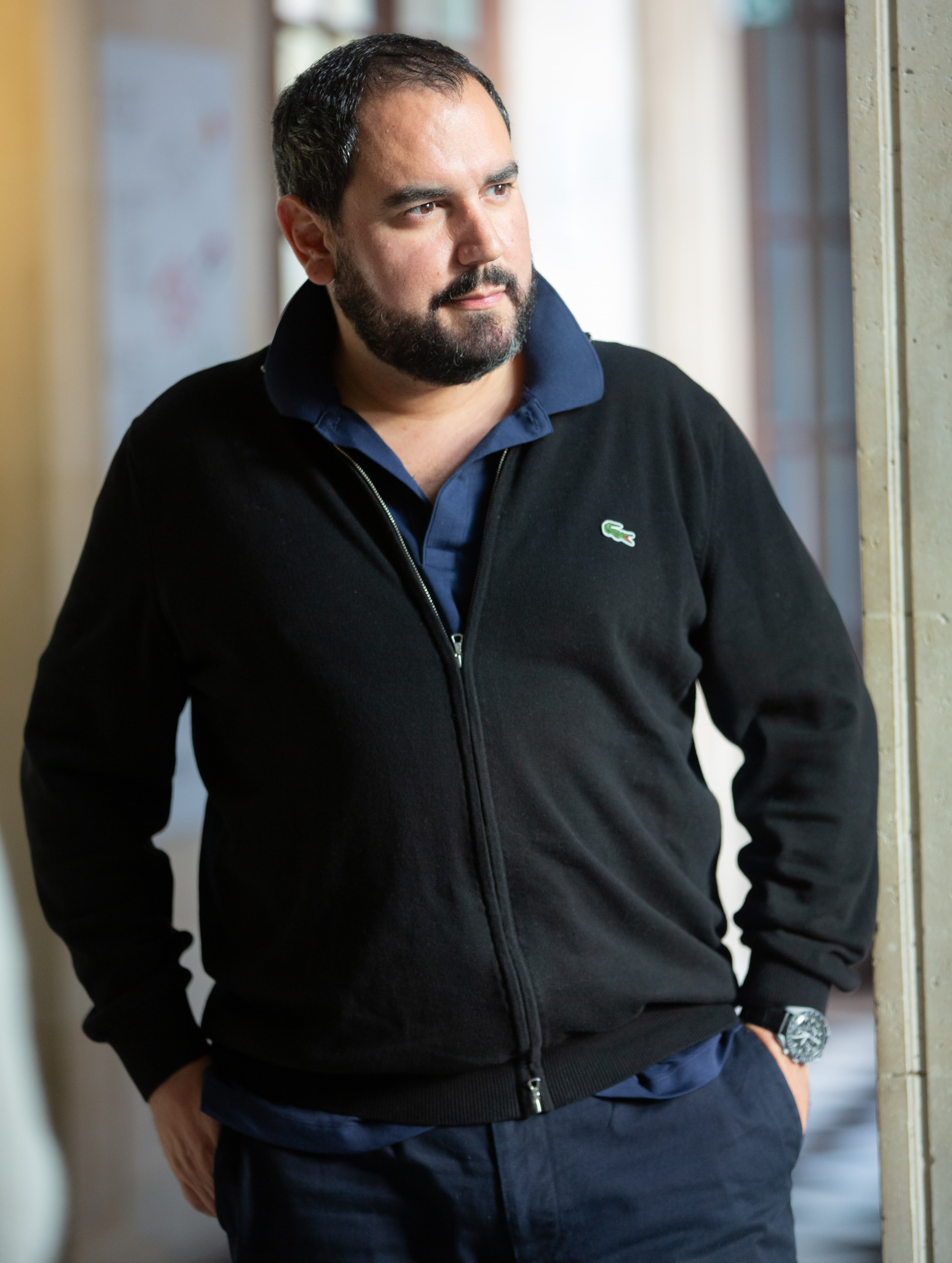
- Born: May 15, 1978 (age 48); Morges, Switzerland

Pierluigi Christophe Orunesu (born May 15, 1978, in Morges, Switzerland) is an entrepreneur of Italo-Swiss origin.

== Biography ==
In September 1998, Pierluigi Christophe Orunesu established Cybel’Art, a company that worked as an executive producer, financing music projects. In 1999, Cybel'Art partnered with the Lausanne-based company Le Produit Music to finance and produce a rhythm and blues album by singer Kathleen Chaplin, granddaughter of Charlie Chaplin.

In the same period, the company also worked with K-mel and Giovanni Danieli, with André Sparascio as composer, arranger and sound engineer.

Cybel'Art later developed icologram, an XR, digital and holographic protocol, with artists including Philippe Entremont and Henri Dès.

In 2008 in Switzerland, Orunesu founded Eurolactis, a business focused on the processing and distribution of Donkey's milk. His company operates worldwide and has a research team in Italy.

In 2011, Eurolactis signed a partnership agreement with football club Inter Milan. In 2017, he stepped down from the presidency, but remained involved as the general manager.

In December 2014, he donated two donkey foals and freeze-dried donkey milk to Pope Francis, intended for the Vatican hospitals.

In 2016, Pierluigi Christophe Orunesu collaborated with Swiss master chocolatier Gérard Fornerod to create "Quartier des Ânes," the first Swiss chocolate bar made with donkey milk, marking an unprecedented innovation in the history of Swiss chocolate-making.

In 2020, Pierluigi Christophe Orunesu was invited to testify at the Agriculture and Agri-Food Commission of the Italian Senate as CEO of Eurolactis, in the context of Bill No. 1197 on the valorization of the Italian Donkey milk production chain. His expert testimony contributed to the legislative discussion aimed at increasing Donkey milk production for human consumption in Italy.

In 2023, his company, Cybel’Art, launched icologram App, a digital and spatial computing startup that allows the virtual presence of artists, such as Henri Dès, through augmented reality technology. His company teamed up with the Orchestre de la Suisse Romande (OSR) to record the world's first holographic symphonic performance presented at Artgenève 2024.

In 2025, Orunesu's company, Cybel’Art, developed and launched Virtual Hall, a virtual reality application designed for symphonic performances, belonging to Orchestre de la Suisse Romande. The platform enables users to view concerts from various on-stage perspectives using 360-degree immersive video. Orunesu is credited as the architect and inventor of the technology, which integrates multi-camera setups and synchronized audio-visual processing. Virtual Hall was first presented at Artgenève 2025.

In 2026, Pierluigi Christophe Orunesu, founder of Swiss ArtTech company Cybel'Art SA, collaborated with legendary Tolkien illustrator John Howe at La Tour du Fantastique in Neuchâtel, Switzerland. In an exclusive interview filmed at Howe's studio within the historic tower, the lead concept artist behind Peter Jackson's The Lord of the Rings and The Hobbit film trilogies endorsed augmented reality and the Cybel'Art protocol as the future of fantasy art, declaring: "Fantasy is a profession of the future through augmented reality and initiatives like yours."

== Personal life ==
Pierluigi Christophe Orunesu has ties to the actress Audrey Hepburn. He spent a portion of his youth at La Paisible, Hepburn's residence. Orunesu's godfather is Sean Ferrer Hepburn, son of Audrey Hepburn and Mel Ferrer.

Orunesu is featured in the documentary Audrey Hepburn: Pain and Glory (2020).

In 2010, Orunesu appeared in the BS-TBS documentary series "Yurari Sanpo: Sekai no Machikado" (A Gentle Walk Through the Streets of the World), in an episode dedicated to the Lake Geneva region and Audrey Hepburn's Swiss life, sharing personal memories of growing up at La Paisible. In 2013, he was featured in the NHK BS Premium documentary "Nao Matsushita — Audrey Forever," presented by Japanese actress and pianist Nao Matsushita.

Since 2008, he has been an active member of the Lions Clubs International, presiding over the Lions Club Jura-Léman from 2015 to 2016.
