= Andrea Dotti (psychiatrist) =

Italian psychiatrist, second husband of Audrey Hepburn (1938–2007)

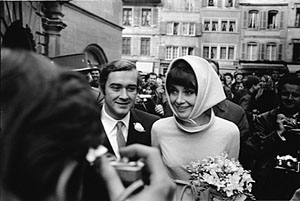
- Dotti and Audrey Hepburn
- Born: Andrea Paolo Mario Dotti; 18 March 1938
- Died: 30 September 2007 (aged 69); Rome, Italy
- Spouse: Audrey Hepburn (m. 1969; div. 1982)
- Children: Luca Dotti

Andrea Paolo Mario Dotti (18 March 1938 – 30 September 2007) was an Italian psychiatrist-neurologist and the second husband of Audrey Hepburn from 1969 to 1982.

== Biography ==
Dotti was a full professor of psychiatry at the Sapienza University of Rome. He was known for his research and clinical work on eating disorders (bulimia and anorexia nervosa), cyclothymic disorders, and pharmacological therapy in psychiatry, the latter being the subject of a successful treatise with Gian Carlo Reda and the pharmacological therapy section in the Italian Treatise of Psychiatry by Cassano and Pancheri.

Dotti came from a wealthy aristocratic family and was a friend or relative of some well-known figures in art and finance. Dotti met Hepburn in June 1968 on a cruise aboard a yacht owned by an Italian socialite. They married on 18 January 1969. Dotti had one child with Hepburn, a son named Luca, born on 8 February 1970.

Dotti and Hepburn were married for 12 years. Much of the marriage was tumultuous due to Dotti's affairs with younger women. Hepburn stayed with Dotti as long as possible for the sake of her sons. However, the couple divorced in 1982.

Dotti died in Rome on 30 September 2007 after complications from a bowel operation.

In 2015, his son Luca Dotti and his step-son Sean Hepburn Ferrer launched a legal feud regarding their mother's estate.
