= Mel Ferrer =

American actor, director and producer (1917–2008)

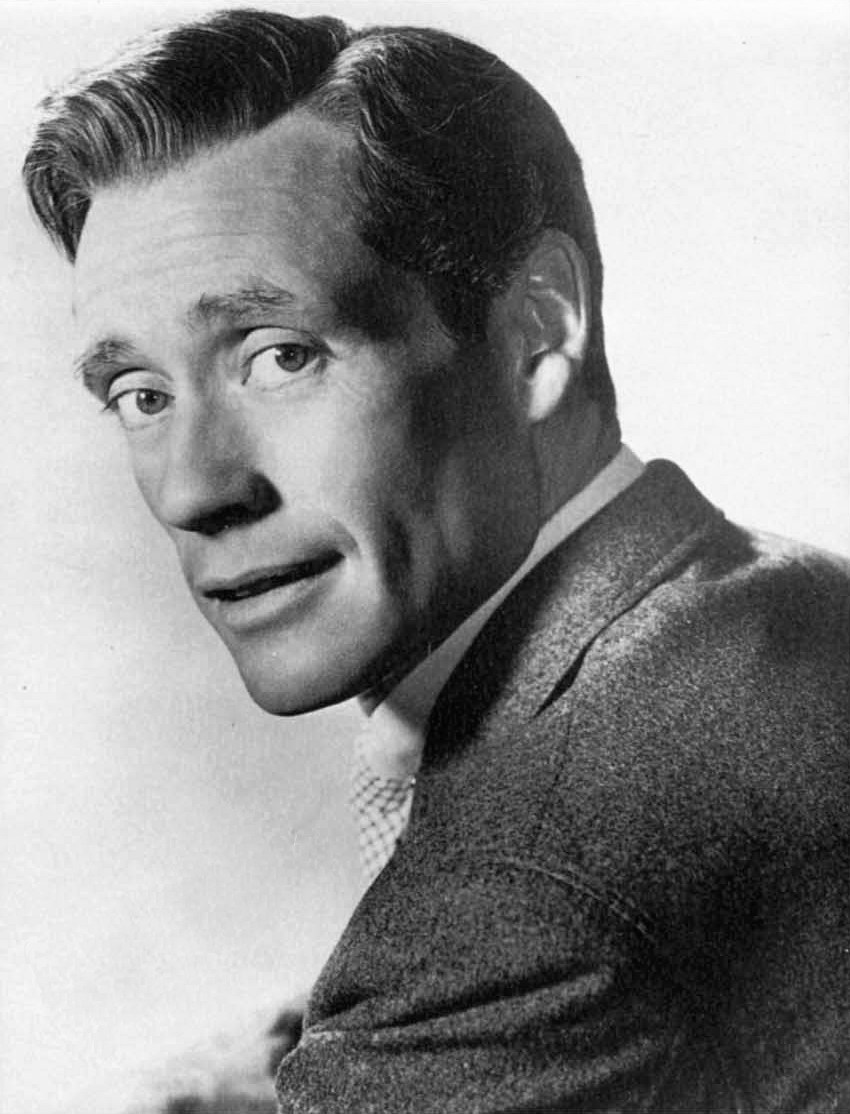
- Ferrer in 1960
- Born: Melchor Gastón Ferrer; August 25, 1917; Elberon, New Jersey, U.S.
- Died: June 2, 2008 (aged 90); Santa Barbara, California, U.S.
- Occupations: Actor; director; producer
- Years active: 1937–1998
- Spouses: Frances Pilchard (m. 1937; div. 1939) (m. 1944; div. 1954) Barbara C. Tripp (m. 1940; div. 1944) Audrey Hepburn (m. 1954; div. 1968) Elizabeth Soukhotine (m. 1971)
- Children: 6, including Sean
- Relatives: Emma Ferrer (granddaughter)

Melchor Gastón Ferrer (Note: Some sources spell his first name as Melchior, but this is incorrect based on Ferrer's records at Princeton University. Also, he was named for his paternal grandfather, Melchor Ferrer. The name Melchor G. Ferrer was used on the cover of Tito's Hats, a children's book that Ferrer wrote in 1940.) (August 25, 1917 – June 2, 2008) was an American actor, director, and producer, active in film, theatre, and television. He achieved prominence on Broadway before scoring notable film hits with Scaramouche (1952), Lili (1953), and Knights of the Round Table (also 1953). He starred opposite his wife, actress Audrey Hepburn, in War and Peace (1956) and produced her film Wait Until Dark (1967).

Beginning in the 1970s, Ferrer acted extensively in Italian films and appeared in several cult hits, including The Antichrist (1974), The Black Corsair (1976) and Nightmare City (1980). He was also a co-founder of the La Jolla Playhouse.

== Early life ==
Ferrer was born in Elberon, New Jersey, of Cuban and Irish descent. His father, Dr. José María Ferrer (December 3, 1857 – February 23, 1920), was born in Havana, Spanish Cuba, of Iberian-Spanish ancestry. José was an authority on pneumonia and served as chief of staff of St. Vincent's Hospital in New York City. He was 59 years old at the time of Mel's birth and died three years later. Mel Ferrer's US-born mother, Mary Matilda Irene (née O'Donohue; January 28, 1878 – February 19, 1967), was a daughter of coffee broker Joseph J. O'Donohue, New York's City Commissioner of Parks, a founder of the Coffee Exchange, and a founder of the Brooklyn-New York Ferry. An ardent opponent of Prohibition, Irene Ferrer (as she was known) was named in 1934 as the New York State chairman of the Citizens Committee for Sane Liquor Laws. Mel's parents married on October 17, 1910, in New York.

His mother's family, the O'Donohues, were prominent Roman Catholics. One of his aunts, Marie Louise O'Donohue, was named a papal countess, while another aunt, Teresa Riley O'Donohue, a leading figure in American Roman Catholic charities and welfare organizations, was granted permission by Pope Pius XI to install a private chapel in her New York City apartment.

Ferrer had three siblings. His elder sister, Dr. María Irene Ferrer (July 30, 1915 – November 12, 2004), was a cardiologist and educator who helped refine the cardiac catheter and electrocardiogram. She died in 2004 in Manhattan at 89 of pneumonia and congestive heart failure. Their brother, Dr. Jose M. Ferrer (November 23, 1912 – December 24, 1982), was a surgeon; he died at 70 from complications of abdominal surgery. Their younger sister, Teresa Ferrer (March 30, 1919 – February 12, 2002), was the religion editor of The New York Herald Tribune and an education editor for Newsweek. She died at 82 from a thoracic aneurysm.

Ferrer was privately educated at the Bovée School in New York (where one of his classmates was the future author Louis Auchincloss) and Canterbury Prep School in Connecticut. He attended Princeton University until his sophomore year, when he dropped out to devote more time to acting.

He worked as an editor of a small Vermont newspaper and wrote the children's book Tito's Hats (Garden City Publishing, 1940). (Note: The book's illustrations are by Jean Charlot.)

== Career ==
=== Early theatre work ===
Ferrer began acting in summer stock as a teenager and in 1937 won the Theatre Intime award for best new play by a Princeton undergraduate; the play was called Awhile to Work and co-starred another college student, Frances Pilchard, who would become Ferrer's first wife later the same year. At 21, he was appearing on the Broadway stage as a chorus dancer, making his debut there as an actor two years later. He appeared as a chorus dancer in two unsuccessful musicals, Cole Porter's You Never Know and Everywhere I Roam. After a bout with polio, Ferrer worked as a disc jockey in Texas and Arkansas and moved to Mexico to work on the novel Tito's Hat (published 1940).

His first acting roles were in a revival of Kind Lady (1940) and Cue for Passion (1940).

=== Columbia Pictures ===
Ferrer was contracted to Columbia Pictures as a director, along with several other "potentials" who began as dialogue directors: Fred Sears, William Castle, Henry Levin and Robert Gordon.

Among the films he worked on were Louisiana Hayride (1944), They Live in Fear (1944), Sergeant Mike (1944), Together Again (1944), Meet Miss Bobby Socks (1944), Let's Go Steady (1944), Ten Cents a Dance (1945), and A Thousand and One Nights (1945). Some were "B" movies but others (Thousand and One Nights) were more prestigious. Ferrer directed The Girl of the Limberlost (1945), starring Ruth Nelson.

=== Broadway ===
Eventually, he returned to Broadway, where he starred in Strange Fruit (1945–46), a play based on the novel by Lillian Smith. It was directed by José Ferrer (no relation). He then directed José Ferrer in the 1946 stage production of Cyrano de Bergerac. He worked as an assistant on The Fugitive (1947), directed by John Ford in Mexico. Along with Gregory Peck, Dorothy McGuire and Joseph Cotten, he founded the La Jolla Playhouse in San Diego.

=== Screen actor ===
Ferrer made his screen acting debut with a starring role in Lost Boundaries (1949), playing a black person who passes for white. The film was controversial and much acclaimed.

=== Howard Hughes's RKO Studios ===
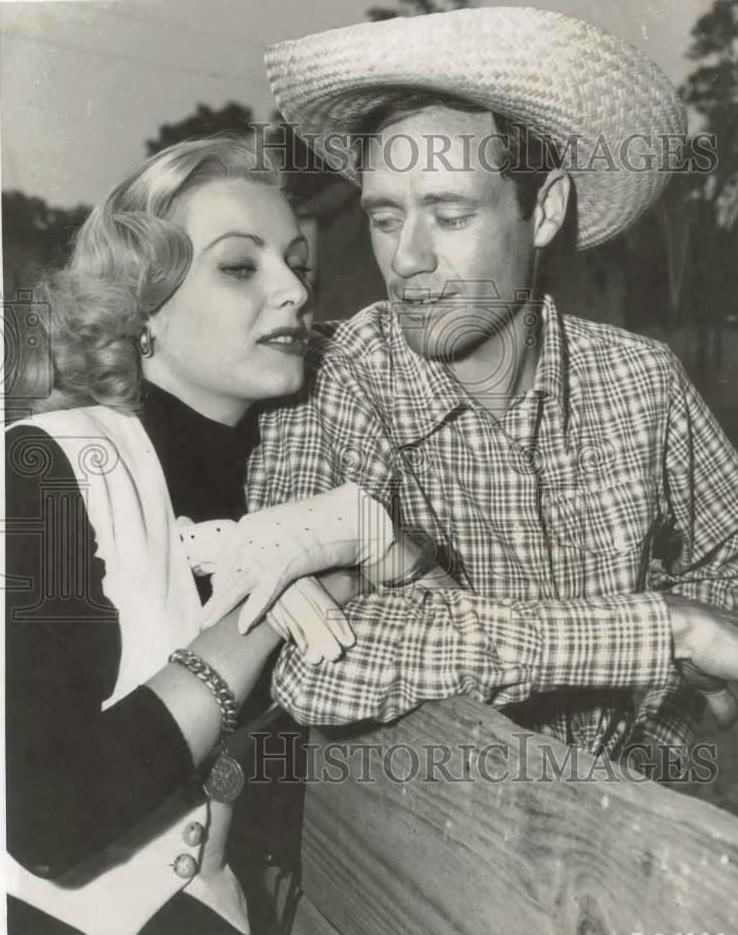
Ferrer with Miroslava in The Brave Bulls (1951)

Ferrer had a supporting role in Born to Be Bad (1950) at RKO, directed by Nicholas Ray. At that studio, he directed Claudette Colbert in The Secret Fury (1950) and directed or co-directed Vendetta (1950), The Racket (1951), and Macao (1952). He starred as a bullfighter in The Brave Bulls (1951) for Robert Rossen at Columbia. Ferrer fought with Arthur Kennedy over Marlene Dietrich in Rancho Notorious (1952), directed by Fritz Lang at RKO.

=== MGM ===
Ferrer went to MGM, replacing Fernando Lamas as the villain in Scaramouche (1952). The film, particularly notable for a long, climactic sword fight between Ferrer and Stewart Granger, was a huge hit. The studio kept him on for Lili (1953) as the title character (played by Leslie Caron)'s love interest. It was another big success; Ferrer and Caron also got a hit single out of it, "Hi-Lili-Hi-Lo". Saadia (1953), which Ferrer made with Cornel Wilde, was a flop, but Knights of the Round Table (1954), in which Ferrer played King Arthur, was another hit. Ferrer met actress Audrey Hepburn at a party; she wanted to do a play together. They appeared in Ondine (1954) on Broadway, and married in Switzerland in September 1954.

=== Europe ===
With Ingrid Bergman in Renoir's Elena and Her Men (1956)

Ferrer went to Italy to make Proibito (1954) and to England for Oh... Rosalinda!! (1955), directed by Powell and Pressburger. Neither film was widely seen, but War and Peace (1956) was a big success; Ferrer played Prince Andrei, co-starring with then-wife Audrey Hepburn. In France, he co-starred with Ingrid Bergman in Elena and Her Men (1956), directed by Jean Renoir.

=== United States ===
Ferrer and Hepburn made Mayerling (1957) for American television; it was released theatrically in some countries. Ferrer returned to MGM to make The Vintage (1957) with Pier Angeli, which was a big flop. He made two films for 20th Century Fox: an all-star adaptation of The Sun Also Rises (1957) and Fräulein (1958), a war story with Dana Wynter. At MGM, he played one of the last three people on Earth in The World, the Flesh and the Devil (1959), another flop. Ferrer went to Italy to star in Roger Vadim's vampire movie Blood and Roses (1960). After an English horror film, The Hands of Orlac (1960), he starred in the Italian adventure film Charge of the Black Lancers (1962). He was one of several stars in The Devil and the Ten Commandments (1962) and The Longest Day (1962). He had a cameo in his wife's Paris When It Sizzles (1964) and was Marcus Aurelius Cleander in The Fall of the Roman Empire (1964).

=== Television ===
Ferrer then turned to television, doing some directing for the series The Farmer's Daughter (1963–66) starring Inger Stevens, William Windom, and Cathleen Nesbitt. Ferrer had a supporting role in Sex and the Single Girl (1964). From 1981 to 1984, he appeared opposite Jane Wyman as Angela Channing's attorney (and briefly her husband), Phillip Erikson, on Falcon Crest (as well as directing several episodes). He played a blackmailing reporter in the Columbo episode "Requiem for a Fallen Star", starring Anne Baxter. He appeared opposite Cyd Charisse in an episode of the long-running Angela Lansbury series, Murder She Wrote, and appeared in two television miniseries, Peter the Great (1986) and Dream West (1986). Later credits include Eye of the Widow (1991) and Catherine the Great (1995).

=== Producer ===
Ferrer produced and starred in the biopic El Greco (1966), playing the famous painter. He also produced Wait Until Dark (1967), starring his wife, another big hit.

He and Hepburn divorced in 1968.

=== Later acting career and European films ===
Ferrer was mostly a jobbing actor in the 1970s, working much in Italy. Among his credits were A Time for Loving (1972); The Antichrist (1974) in Italy; Brannigan (1974), a crime drama set in London that starred John Wayne; Silent Action (1975) and The Suspicious Death of a Minor (1975), both for Sergio Martino; The Net (1975), shot in Germany; The Black Corsair (1976), an Italian swashbuckler; Gangbuster (1977) in Italy; The Pyjama Girl Case (1977); Seagulls Fly Low (1977).

In the U.S., he was in Hi-Riders (1978), The Norseman (1978), Guyana: Crime of the Century (1979), and The Fifth Floor (1979). In 1979, he portrayed Dr. Brogli in an episode of Return of the Saint. In Europe, he was in The Visitor (1979), Island of the Fishmen (1980), Nightmare City (1980), The Great Alligator River (1980) and Eaten Alive! (1980). He went to Germany for Lili Marleen (1981). He worked in two of Spanish actress Marisol's film vehicles: Cabriola and La chica del molino rojo, being the director of the first and acting in the second.

For his contributions to the motion picture industry, Mel Ferrer has a star on the Hollywood Walk of Fame at 6268 Hollywood Blvd.

== Personal life ==
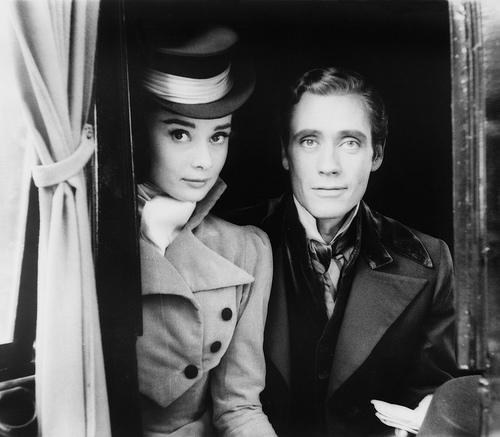
Ferrer with Audrey Hepburn in War and Peace (1955)

Ferrer married five times, to four women, with whom he had six children. His wives were:

1. Frances Gunby Pilchard (1917-1985), his first and third wife, an actress who became a sculptor. They married in 1937, and divorced in 1939 after having one child together, who died before their divorce.
2. Barbara C. Tripp (1916-1972), whom Ferrer married in 1940 and later divorced. They had two children: daughter Mela Ferrer and son Christopher Ferrer.
3. Frances Gunby Pilchard, for the 2nd time; they remarried in 1944, and later divorced, after having two more children together: Pepa Philippa Ferrer, who was conceived during his marriage with Tripp, and Mark Young Ferrer.
4. Audrey Hepburn, to whom he was married from 1954 until 1968. They had one son, Sean Hepburn Ferrer.
5. Elizabeth Soukhotine (1936-2013), from Belgium, to whom he was married from 1971 to his death in 2008.

Before his marriage to Elizabeth Soukhotine in 1971, Ferrer had a relationship with 29-year-old interior designer Tessa Kennedy.

== Death ==
A resident of Carpinteria, California, Ferrer died of heart failure at a convalescent home in Santa Barbara, California on June 2, 2008, at age 90.

== Filmography ==
=== Film ===
==== Actor ====
Year	Title	Role	Notes
1947	The Fugitive	Father Serra	Uncredited
1949	Lost Boundaries	Scott Mason Carter	
1950	Born to Be Bad	Gobby	
1951	The Brave Bulls	Luis Bello	
1952	Rancho Notorious	Frenchy Fairmont	
1952	Scaramouche	Noel, Marquis de Maynes	
1953	Lili	Paul Berthalet	
1953	Knights of the Round Table	King Arthur	
1953	Saadia	Henrik	
1954	Proibito	Don Paolo Salinas	
1955	Oh... Rosalinda!!	Capt. Alfred Westerman	
1956	War and Peace	Prince Andrei Bolkonsky	
1956	Elena and Her Men	Henri de Chevincourt	
1957	The Vintage	Giancarlo Barandero	
1957	The Sun Also Rises	Robert Cohn	
1958	Fräulein	Maj. Foster MacLain	
1959	The World, the Flesh and the Devil	Benson Thacker	
1960	Blood and Roses	Leopoldo De Karnstein	
1960	L'Homme à femmes	Georges Gauthier	
1960	The Hands of Orlac	Stephen Orlac	
1961	Love, Freedom and Treachery	Mirko	
1962	Charge of the Black Lancers	Andrea Di Tula	
1962	The Devil and the Ten Commandments	Philip Allan	Segment: "Luxurieux point ne seras"
1962	The Longest Day	Maj. General Robert Haines	
1962	Marco Polo		Unfinished
1963	Charade	Man Smoking Cigarette in Nightclub	Uncredited
1964	Paris When It Sizzles	Costume Party Jekyll & Hyde	Uncredited
1964	The Fall of the Roman Empire	Cleander	
1964	Sex and the Single Girl	Rudy	
1964	Who Are My Own	Juan Bautista de La Salle	
1966	El Greco	El Greco	
1967	Wait Until Dark	Radio Announcer (voice)	Uncredited
1972	A Time for Loving	Dr. Harrison	
1973	The Girl from the Red Cabaret	Dalton Harvey	
1974	The Antichrist	Massimo Oderisi	
1975	Brannigan	Fields	
1975	Silent Action	District Attorney Mannino	
1975	The Suspicious Death of a Minor	Police Superintendent	
1975	The Net	Aurelio Morelli	
1976	Eaten Alive	Harvey Wood	
1976	The Black Corsair	Van Gould	
1977	Gangbuster	Peseti, the Boss	
1978	Seagulls Fly Low	Roberto Micheli	
1978	The Pyjama Girl Case	Professor Henry Douglas	
1978	Hi-Riders	Sheriff	
1978	The Norseman	King Eurich	
1978	Yesterday's Tomorrow	Colonel Stone	
1978	The Fifth Floor	Dr. Sidney Coleman	
1978	L'immoralità	Vera's husband	
1979	Screamers	Radcliffe	U.S. cut only
1979	The Visitor	Dr. Walker	
1979	The Great Alligator River	Joshua	
1980	Eaten Alive!	Professor Carter	
1980	Nightmare City	General Murchison	
1981	Lili Marleen	David Mendelsson	
1981	Vultures on the City	Sheriff	
1982	A Thousand Billion Dollars	Cornelius A. Woeagen	
1982	Deadly Game	Stephan Mathiesen	
1984	A Soft Sunset	Franz Bollenstein	
1991	Eye of the Widow	Frankenheimer	

==== Filmmaker ====
Year	Title	Contributed to			Notes
Year	Title	Director	Producer	Other	Notes
1944	Louisiana Hayride			Yes	As dialogue coach
1944	They Live in Fear			Yes	As dialogue coach
1944	Sergeant Mike			Yes	As dialogue coach
1944	Together Again			Yes	As dialogue coach
1944	Meet Miss Bobby Socks			Yes	As dialogue coach
1945	Let's Go Steady			Yes	As dialogue coach
1945	Ten Cents a Dance			Yes	As dialogue coach
1945	Boston Blackie's Rendezvous			Yes	As dialogue coach
1945	A Thousand and One Nights			Yes	As dialogue coach
1945	The Girl of the Limberlost	Yes			Directorial Debut
1947	The Fugitive			Yes	As directorial assistant
1950	The Secret Fury	Yes			
1950	Vendetta	Yes			Replaced Stuart Heisler
1951	The Racket	Yes			Uncredited, directed additional scenes
1952	Macao	Yes			Uncredited, directed one day of reshoots
1959	Green Mansions	Yes			
1965	Cabriola	Yes	Executive	Yes	Also writer
1966	El Greco		Yes		
1967	Wait Until Dark		Yes		
1971	The Night Visitor		Yes		
1972	Embassy		Yes		

=== Television ===
==== Actor ====
Year	Title	Role	Notes
1953–54	Omnibus	Chairman of the Board, Jeff Talbot	2 episodes
1957	Producers' Showcase	Crown Prince Rudolph	Episode: "Mayerling"
1957	ITV Play of the Week		Episode: "Lost Boundaries"
1959	Dick Powell's Zane Grey Theatre	Marshal Monty Elstrode	Episode: "The Ghost"
1959	Rendezvous		Episode: "London in the Spring"
1963	Bob Hope Presents the Chrysler Theatre	Peter Carrington	Episode: "The Fifth Passenger"
1973	Columbo	Jerry Parks	Episode: "Requiem for a Falling Star"
1973	Carola	Gen. Franz von Clodius	Television film
1973	Tenafly	Charlie Rush	Episode: "Pilot"
1973	Search	John Rickman	Episode: "Suffer My Child"
1974	Police Story	Dr. Ross	Episode: "Wyatt Earp Syndrome"
1974	Marcus Welby, M.D.	Carlo	Episode: "Designs"
1976	Ellery Queen	Brandon Childs	Episode: "The Adventure of the Disappearing Dagger"
1976	Origins of the Mafia	Armando Della Morra	Episode: "La legge"
1977	Hawaii Five-O	Emil Radick / Father Neill	2 episodes
1977	Baretta	Alex Kramer	Episode: "Everybody Pays the Fare"
1977	The Fantastic Journey	Appolonius	Episode: "Funhouse"
1977	Lanigan's Rabbi	Mike Rushmore	Episode: "In Hot Weather, the Crime Rate Soars"
1977	The New Adventures of Wonder Woman	Fritz Gerlich	Episode: "Anschluss '77"
1977	Logan's Run	Analog	Episode: "Man Out of Time"
1977	Sharon: Portrait of a Mistress	David	Television film
1978	Black Beauty	Nicholas Skinner	Television miniseries
1978	How the West Was Won	Hale Burton	3 episodes
1978	The Return of Captain Nemo	Dr. Robert Cook	Television film
1979	Return of the Saint	Dr. Paolo Brogli	Episode: "Vicious Circle"
1979	Eischied		Episode: "Who Is the Missing Woman?"
1979–80	Dallas	Harrison Page	2 episodes
1980	Top of the Hill	Andreas Heggener	Television film
1980	Hagen	Poole	Episode: "The Straw Man"
1980	The Memory of Eva Ryker	Dr. Sanford	Television film
1980	Fugitive Family	Anthony Durano	Television film
1981	Behind the Screen	Evan Hammer	Episode: "Pilot"
1981–84	Falcon Crest	Phillip Erikson	54 episodes
1982	Fantasy Island	Moriarity, Lord Collingwood	Episode: "The Case Against Mr. Roarke/Save Sherlock Holmes"
1982	One Shoe Makes It Murder	Carl Charnock	Television film
1984	Finder of Lost Loves	George Matthews	Episode: "Forgotten Melodies"
1985	Seduced	Arthur Orloff	Television film
1985	Hotel	Garrett Hardy, Anthony Palandrini	2 episodes
1985	The Love Boat	Jack Powers	2 episodes
1985	Glitter		Episode: "Nightfall"
1985–89	Murder, She Wrote	Miles Austin, Eric Brahm	2 episodes
1986	Peter the Great	Frederick	Television miniseries
1986	Outrage!	Judge Michael Lengel	Television film
1986	Dream West	Judge Elkins	Television miniseries
1989	Wild Jack		Television miniseries
1989–90	Christine Cromwell	Doctor	4 episodes
1995	Catherine the Great	Patriarch	Television film
1998	Stories from My Childhood	Geppetto (voice)	Episode: "Pinocchio and the Golden Key"

== Theatre credits ==
Year	Title	Contributed to			Role	Venue
Year	Title	Actor	Director	Producer	Role	Venue
1936	Night of January 16th	Yes				The Cape Playhouse, Dennis
1938	You Never Know	Yes			Dancer	Winter Garden Theatre, Broadway
1938	Everywhere I Roam	Yes				National Theatre, Broadway
1939	American Landscape	Yes			Abraham Cohen	Lydia Mendelssohn Theatre, Ann Arbor
1939	Captain Brassbound's Conversion	Yes			American Bluejacket	Lydia Mendelssohn Theatre, Ann Arbor
1940	Kind Lady	Yes			Peter Stanard	Playhouse Theatre, Broadway
1940	Cue for Passion	Yes			Reporter	Royale Theatre, Broadway
1945–46	Strange Fruit	Yes			Tracy Deen	Royale Theatre, Broadway
1946–47	Cyrano de Bergerac		Yes		—N/a	Alvin Theatre, Broadway
1946–47	Cyrano de Bergerac		Yes		—N/a	Ethel Barrymore Theatre, Broadway
1947	Heartsong		Yes		—N/a	Shubert Theatre, New Haven
1947	Heartsong		Yes		—N/a	Walnut Street Theatre, Philadelphia
1947	Dear Ruth		Yes			La Jolla Playhouse, San Diego
1949	Command Decision		Yes			La Jolla Playhouse, San Diego
1949	The Importance of Being Earnest	Yes				La Jolla Playhouse, San Diego
1949	Ring Round the Moon	Yes				La Jolla Playhouse, San Diego
1950	Our Town		Yes		—N/a	La Jolla Playhouse, San Diego
1951	The Voice of the Turtle	Yes	Yes		Bill Page	La Jolla Playhouse, San Diego
1952	Strike a Match		Yes	Yes	—N/a	La Jolla Playhouse, San Diego
1952–53	Strike a Match		Yes	Yes	—N/a	U.S. tour
1954	Ondine	Yes			Ritter Hans	46th St. Theatre, Broadway
1987	The Best Man	Yes				Ahmanson Theatre, Los Angeles

== Radio credits ==
Year	Program	Episode/source
1952	Family Theater	Hound of Heaven
1953	Radio Theater	Undercurrent
