= 45th Annual Grammy Awards =

2003 US music awards ceremony

- Date: February 23, 2003
- Location: Madison Square Garden, New York City
- Most awards: Norah Jones (5)
- Most nominations: Avril Lavigne (5) Norah Jones (5)
- Website: https://www.grammy.com/awards/45th-annual-grammy-awards

Television/radio coverage
- Network: CBS

The 45th Annual Grammy Awards were held on February 23, 2003, at Madison Square Garden in New York City honoring the best in music for the recording of the year beginning from October 1, 2001, through September 30, 2002. Musicians' accomplishments from the previous year were recognized. Norah Jones, her album Come Away with Me, and her song "Don't Know Why" were the main recipients of the night, garnering six Grammys, including four major awards: Record of the Year, Album of the Year, Song of the Year and Best New Artist, plus Best Female Pop Vocal Performance and Best Pop Vocal Album. Songwriter Jesse Harris received the Song of the Year award for his work on "Don't Know Why." Simon and Garfunkel reunited to open the show performing "The Sound of Silence".

The Bee Gees were presented with the "Legend Award", only 42 days after the sudden death of Maurice Gibb. The award was received by the surviving brothers, Barry and Robin. During Barry's speech, he made mention of Maurice's widow Yvonne and their children Adam and Sami, and in a heartfelt, gracious and tearful moment announced that he and Robin were presenting the award to Maurice. It was then accepted by Adam, at Barry's request, on behalf of his late father, his mother and his sister.

== Performers ==
Artist(s)	Song(s)
Simon & Garfunkel	"The Sound of Silence"
No Doubt	"Underneath it All" "Hella Good"
Norah Jones	"Dont Know Why"
Faith Hill	"Cry"
Vanessa Carlton	"A Thousand Miles"
John Mayer	"Your Body Is A Wonderland"
James Taylor Yo-Yo Ma	"Sweet Baby James"
Dixie Chicks	"Landslide"
New York Phillharmonic	"Dance at the Gym (Mambo)" from West Side Story
Coldplay New York Phillharmonic	"Politik"
Avril Lavigne	"Sk8er Boi"
Nelly Kelly Rowland	"Hot in Herre" "Dilemma"
Bruce Springsteen E Street Band	"The Rising"
Ashanti	"Dreams"
NSYNC	Tribute to the Bees Gees "Lonely Days" "How Can You Mend a Broken Heart" "How Deep is Your Love" "Stayin Alive"
Eminem Proof	"Lose Yourself"
Sheryl Crow Kid Rock	"You’re An Original"
Elvis Costello Bruce Springsteen Dave Grohl Little Steven	Tribute to Joe Strummer "London Calling"

== Presenters ==
- Dustin Hoffman - introduced Simon & Garfunkel
- Lou Reed & Dave Grohl - presented Best Pop Performance by a Duo or Group with Vocals
- Tony Bennett & Joe Pantoliano - introduced Norah Jones
- Kylie Minogue & Justin Timberlake - presented Best Pop Vocal Album
- Marc Anthony - paid tribute to Tito Puente, a Lifetime Award recipient, and introduced Faith Hill
- Paul Shaffer - introduced Vanessa Carlton
- Herbie Hancock, Martina McBride & Raphael Saadiq - presented Best Country Album
- Kim Cattrall & P. Diddy - presented Best Male Pop Vocal Performance & Best Rap Album
- Queen Latifah - introduced the Dixie Chicks
- John Leguizamo - paid tribute to Glenn Miller, a Lifetime Achievement Award recipient, an introduced the New York Philharmonic Orchestra
- Harvey Fierstein & Rod Stewart - presented Best Comedy Album
- Busta Rhymes & Jamie-Lynn Sigler - paid tribute to Johnny Mathis, a Lifetime Achievement Award recipient, and introduced Avril Lavigne.
- Queen Latifah - introduced Nelly and Kelly Rowland
- Eve & Fred Durst - presented Best Hard Rock Performance
- Robin Williams - introduced Bruce Springsteen and the E Street Band
- Alicia Keys & Cyndi Lauper - presented Best New Artist
- Pat Monahan, Erykah Badu & B.B. King - presented Song of the Year
- Ja Rule and Kevin James - introduced Ashanti
- Ed Bradley - introduced the Bee Gees tribute
- Willem Dafoe - introduced Eminem
- Bonnie Raitt & Aretha Franklin - paid tribute to Etta James, A Lifetime Achievement Award recipient, and presented Record of the Year
- Vince Vaughn - paid tribute to Trustee Award recipient Royal Blakeman and introduced Kid Rock and Sheryl Crow
- Elvis Costello, Michelle Branch & Peter Gabriel - presented Album of the Year

== Winners and nominees ==
=== General ===
Record of the Year

- "Don't Know Why" – Norah Jones
  - Norah Jones, Arif Mardin & Jay Newland, producers; Arif Mardin & Jay Newland, engineers/mixers
- "A Thousand Miles" – Vanessa Carlton
  - Ron Fair, producer; Tal Herzberg, Jack Joseph Puig & Michael C. Ross, engineers/mixers
- "Without Me" – Eminem
  - Jeff Bass & Eminem, producers; Steve King, engineer/mixer
- "Dilemma" – Nelly & Kelly Rowland
  - Bam & Ryan Bowser, producers; Brian Garten, engineer/mixer
- "How You Remind Me" – Nickelback
  - Nickelback & Rick Parashar, producers; Joey Moi & Randy Staub, engineers/mixers

Album of the Year

- Come Away With Me – Norah Jones
  - Norah Jones, Arif Mardin, Jay Newland & Craig Street, producers; Husky Huskolds, Arif Mardin & Jay Newland, engineers/mixers; Ted Jensen, mastering engineer
- Home – Dixie Chicks
  - Dixie Chicks & Lloyd Maines, producers; Gary Paczosa, engineer/mixer; Robert Hadley & Doug Sax, mastering engineers
- The Eminem Show – Eminem
  - Jeff Bass, Dr. Dre, Eminem & Denaun Porter, producers; Steve Baughman, Mauricio "Veto" Iragorri & Steve King, engineers/mixers; Brian "Big Bass" Gardner, mastering engineer
- Nellyville – Nelly
  - Jason "Jay E" Epperson, Just Blaze, The Neptunes, The Trackboyz & Waiel "Wally" Yaghnam, producers; Steve Eigner, Brian Garten, Russ Giraud, Gimel "Young Guru" Keaton, Greg Morgenstein, Matt Still & Rich Travali, engineers/mixers; Herb Powers, mastering engineer
- The Rising – Bruce Springsteen
  - Brendan O'Brien, producer; Nick DiDia & Brendan O'Brien, engineers/mixers; Bob Ludwig, mastering engineer

Song of the Year

- "Don't Know Why"
  - Jesse Harris, songwriter (Norah Jones)
- "Complicated"
  - Avril Lavigne, & The Matrix, songwriters (Avril Lavigne)
- "The Rising"
  - Bruce Springsteen, songwriter (Bruce Springsteen)
- "A Thousand Miles"
  - Vanessa Carlton, songwriter, (Vanessa Carlton)
- "Where Were You (When the World Stopped Turning)"
  - Alan Jackson, songwriter (Alan Jackson)

Best New Artist

- Norah Jones
- Ashanti
- Michelle Branch
- Avril Lavigne
- John Mayer

=== Pop ===
Best Female Pop Vocal Performance

- "Don't Know Why" – Norah Jones
- "Soak Up the Sun" – Sheryl Crow
- "Complicated" – Avril Lavigne
- "Get the Party Started" – Pink
- "Overprotected" – Britney Spears

Best Male Pop Vocal Performance

- "Your Body Is a Wonderland" – John Mayer
- "7 Days" – Craig David
- "Original Sin" – Elton John
- "Fragile (Live)" – Sting
- "October Road" – James Taylor

Best Pop Performance by a Duo or Group with Vocal

- "Hey Baby" – No Doubt
- "Everyday" – Bon Jovi
- "Girl All the Bad Guys Want" – Bowling for Soup
- "Where Are You Going" – Dave Matthews Band
- "Girlfriend" – *NSYNC

Best Pop Collaboration with Vocals

- Santana & Michelle Branch for "The Game of Love"
- Christina Aguilera and Redman – "Dirrty"
- India.Arie and Stevie Wonder – "The Christmas Song"
- Tony Bennett and k.d. lang – "What a Wonderful World"
- Sheryl Crow and Don Henley – "It's So Easy"
- Natalie Cole and Diana Krall – "Better Than Anything"

Best Pop Instrumental Performance

- B.B. King for "Auld Lang Syne"

Best Pop Vocal Album

- Norah Jones - Come Away with Me
- Avril Lavigne - Let Go
- Pink - Missundaztood
- Britney Spears - Britney
- No Doubt - Rock Steady

Best Pop Instrumental Album

- Norman Brown for Just Chillin'

=== Alternative ===
Best Alternative Music Album

- A Rush of Blood to the Head – Coldplay
- Sea Change – Beck
- Walking with Thee – Clinic
- Cruel Smile – Elvis Costello & The Imposters
- Behind the Music – The Soundtrack of Our Lives

=== Blues ===
- Best Traditional Blues Album
  - Anthony Daigle, John Holbrock (engineers/mixers) & B. B. King (producer & artist) for A Christmas Celebration of Hope
- Best Contemporary Blues Album
  - Joe Henry (producer), S. Husky Höskulds (engineer/mixer) & Solomon Burke for Don't Give Up on Me

=== Children's ===
- Best Musical Album for Children
  - Joseph Miskulin (producer), Dan Rudin, Brent Truitt (engineers/mixers) & Riders in the Sky for Monsters, Inc. Scream Factory Favorites
- Best Spoken Word Album for Children
  - Tom Chapin for There Was an Old Lady Who Swallowed a Fly

=== Comedy ===
- From 1994 through 2003, see "Best Spoken Comedy Album" under the "Spoken" field, below.

=== Classical ===
- Best Orchestral Performance
  - Andreas Neubronner (producer), Peter Laenger (engineer), Michael Tilson Thomas (conductor) & the San Francisco Symphony Orchestra for Mahler: Symphony No. 6
- Best Classical Vocal Performance
  - Erik Smith (producer), Jonathan Stokes, Neil Hutchinson, Tom Lazarus (engineers), Patrick Summers (conductor), Renée Fleming & Coro del Maggio Musicale Fiorentino for Bel Canto (Bellini, Donizetti, Rossini, etc.)
- Best Opera Recording
  - Christoph Classen (producer), Tobias Lehmann, Eberhard Sengpiel (engineers), Daniel Barenboim (conductor), Jane Eaglen, Thomas Hampson, Waltraud Meier, René Pape, the Chor der Deutschen Staatsoper Berlin & the Staatskapelle Berlinfor Wagner: Tannhäuser
- Best Choral Performance
  - Thomas Moore (producer), Michael J. Bishop (engineer), Robert Spano (conductor), Norman Mackenzie (chorus director), Christine Goerke, Brett Polegato & the Atlanta Symphony Orchestra & Chorus for Vaughan Williams: A Sea Symphony (Sym. No. 1)
- Best Instrumental Soloist(s) Performance (with orchestra)
  - Thomas Frost (producer), Richard King (engineer), Neville Marriner (conductor), Hilary Hahn & the Academy of St. Martin in the Fields for Brahms/Stravinsky: Violin Concertos
- Best Instrumental Soloist Performance (without orchestra)
  - Andreas Neubronner (producer & engineer) & Murray Perahia for Chopin: Études, Op. 10 & Op. 25
- Best Small Ensemble Performance (with or without conductor)
  - Steve Barnett (producer), Preston Smith (engineer), Joseph Jennings (conductor), Chanticleer & the Handel & Haydn Society of Boston for Tavener: Lamentations and Praises
- Best Chamber Music Performance
  - Andrew Keener (producer), Simon Dominic Eadon (engineer) & the Takács Quartet for Beethoven: String Quartets ("Razumovsky" Op. 59, 1-3; "Harp" Op. 74)
- Best Classical Contemporary Composition
  - Steve Barnett (producer), Preston Smith (engineer), John Tavener (composer), Joseph Jennings (conductor), Chanticleer & the Handel & Haydn Society of Boston for Tavener: Lamentations and Praises
- Best Classical Album
  - Thomas Moore (producer), Michael J. Bishop (engineer), Robert Spano (conductor), Norman Mackenzie (chorus director), Christine Goerke, Brett Polegato & the Atlanta Symphony Orchestra & Chorus for Vaughan Williams: A Sea Symphony (Sym. No. 1)
- Best Classical Crossover Album
  - Sid McLauchlan (producer), Richard Lancaster, Ulrich Vette (engineers), André Previn (conductor) & the London Symphony Orchestra for Previn Conducts Korngold (Sea Hawk; Captain Blood, etc.)

=== Composing and arranging ===
- Best Instrumental Composition
  - Thomas Newman (composer) for "Six Feet Under Title Theme"
- Best Instrumental Arrangement
  - Thomas Newman (arranger) for "Six Feet Under Title Theme"
- Best Instrumental Arrangement Accompanying Vocalist(s)
  - Dave Grusin (arranger) for "Mean Old Man" performed by James Taylor

=== Country ===
- Best Female Country Vocal Performance
  - Faith Hill for "Cry"
- Best Male Country Vocal Performance
  - Johnny Cash for "Give My Love to Rose"
- Best Country Performance by a Duo or Group with Vocal
  - Dixie Chicks for "Long Time Gone"
- Best Country Collaboration with Vocals
  - Willie Nelson & Lee Ann Womack for "Mendocino County Line"
- Best Country Instrumental Performance
  - Dixie Chicks for "Lil' Jack Slade"
- Best Country Song
  - Alan Jackson (songwriter) for "Where Were You (When the World Stopped Turning)"
- Best Country Album
  - Lloyd Maines (producer), Gary Paczosa (engineer/mixer) & the Dixie Chicks (producers & artists) for Home
- Best Bluegrass Album
  - David Castle (engineer/mixer), the Clinch Mountain Boys, Jim Lauderdale (producers & artists) & Ralph Stanley for Lost in the Lonesome Pines

=== Dance ===
- Best Dance Recording
  - Dirty Vegas (producers & artists) for "Days Go By"

=== Film/TV/media ===
- Best Compilation Soundtrack Album for a Motion Picture, Television or Other Visual Media
  - Allan Slutsky, Harry Weinger (producers), Ted Greenberg (producer & engineer/mixer), Kooster McAllister (engineer/mixer) & The Funk Brothers for Standing in the Shadows of Motown performed by The Funk Brothers & various artists
- Best Song Written for a Motion Picture, Television or Other Visual Media
  - Randy Newman (songwriter) for "If I Didn't Have You" (from Monsters, Inc.) performed by John Goodman & Billy Crystal
- Best Score Soundtrack Album for a Motion Picture, Television or Other Visual Media
  - John J. Kurlander (engineer/mixer) & Howard Shore (producer & composer) for The Lord of the Rings - The Fellowship of the Ring

=== Folk ===
- Best Traditional Folk Album
  - Steven Heller (producer), Steven Heller (engineer/mixer), David Holt (producer & artist) & Doc Watson & for Legacy
- Best Contemporary Folk Album
  - Alison Krauss (producer), Gary Paczosa (engineer/mixer) & Nickel Creek for This Side
- Best Native American Music Album
  - Thomas A. Wasinger (producer) & Mary Youngblood (producer & artist) for Beneath the Raven Moon

=== Gospel ===
- Best Pop/Contemporary Gospel Album
  - Vance Powell, Jack Joseph Puig (engineers/mixers) & Jars of Clay (producers & artist) for The Eleventh Hour
- Best Rock Gospel Album
  - Monroe Jones (producer), James J Dineen III (engineer/mixer) & Third Day for Come Together
- Best Traditional Soul Gospel Album
  - John Chelew (producer), Jimmy Hoyson (engineer/mixer) & the Blind Boys of Alabama for Higher Ground
- Best Contemporary Soul Gospel Album
  - Glaurys Ariass, Helsa Ariass (producers & engineers/mixers), Chris Puram (engineer/mixer) & Eartha (producer & artist) for Sidebars
- Best Southern, Country or Bluegrass Gospel Album
  - Art Greenhaw (producer & engineer/mixer), Tim Cooper, Chuck Ebert, Art Greenhaw, Adrian Payne, Robb Tripp & Philip W. York (engineers/mixers), The Jordanaires, Larry Ford & The Light Crust Doughboys for We Called Him Mr. Gospel Music: The James Blackwood Tribute Album
- Best Gospel Choir or Chorus Album
  - B.J. Goss (engineer/mixer) & Carol Cymbala (producer & choir director) for Be Glad performed by the Brooklyn Tabernacle Choir

=== Historical ===
- Best Historical Album
  - Dean Blackwood (producer), David Glasser, Christopher King & Matt Sandoski (engineers) for Screamin' and Hollerin' the Blues: The Worlds of Charley Patton

=== Jazz ===
- Best Jazz Instrumental Solo
  - Herbie Hancock for My Ship
- Best Jazz Instrumental Album, Individual or Group
  - Doug Doctor, Jay Newland, Rob Griffin (engineers/mixers), Jason Olaine (producer), Michael Brecker (producer & artist), Herbie Hancock & Roy Hargrove for Directions in Music: Live at Massey Hall
- Best Large Jazz Ensemble Album
  - James Farber (engineer/mixer), Dave Holland, Louise Holland (producers) & the Dave Holland Big Band for What Goes Around
- Best Jazz Vocal Album
  - Al Schmitt (engineer/mixer), Tommy LiPuma (producer) & Diana Krall for Live in Paris
- Best Contemporary Jazz Album
  - Rob Eaton (engineer/mixer), Lyle Mays, Pat Metheny, Steven Rodby (producers) & the Pat Metheny Group for Speaking of Now
- Best Latin Jazz Album
  - Phil Magnotti (engineer/mixer), Dave Samuels (producer) & the Caribbean Jazz Project for The Gathering

=== Latin ===
- Best Latin Pop Album
  - Bob St. John, Eric Schilling, Gustavo Afont, Iker Gastraminsa, Jaime Lagueruela, Jon Fausty (engineers/mixers), Gonzalo Vasquez (engineer/mixer & producer) Luis Ochoa (producer) & Bacilos (producers and artists) for Caraluna
- Best Traditional Tropical Latin Album
  - Catherine Miller (engineer/mixer), Nat Chediak (producer) & the Bebo Valdés Trio for El Arte del Sabor performed by the Bebo Valdés Trio with Israel López "Cachao" & Carlos "Patato" Valdés
- Best Mexican/Mexican-American Album
  - Benny Faccone (engineer/mixer). Franco Giordani, John Karpowich & Dennis Parker (engineers) & Joan Sebastian (producer & artist) for Lo Dijo El Corazón
- Best Latin Rock/Alternative Album
  - Benny Faccone (engineer/mixer) Alex González, Fher Olvera (producers) & Maná for Revolución de Amor
- Best Tejano Album
  - Gustavo Alphonso Miranda (engineer/mixer), Manuel Herrera Maldonado (producer) & Emilio Navaira for Acuérdate
- Best Salsa Album
  - Jon Fausty, Maria DeJesus (engineers/mixers), Sergio George (producer) & Celia Cruz for La Negra Tiene Tumbao
- Best Merengue Album
  - Manuel Antonio Tejada Tabar, Raphael Peña, Rolando Alejandro (engineers/mixers), Jose Lugo (producer) & Grupo Mania for Latino

=== Musical show ===
- Best Musical Show Album
  - Peter Karam (engineer/mixer), Marc Shaiman (producer, composer & lyricist) & Scott Wittman (lyricist) & the original Broadway cast including Marissa Jaret Winokur & Harvey Fierstein, for Hairspray

=== Music video ===
- Best Short Form Music Video
  - Greg Tharp (video producer), Joseph Kahn (video director) & Eminem for "Without Me"
- Best Long Form Music Video
  - Don Letts (video director) & The Clash for Westway to the World

=== New Age ===
- Best New Age Album
  - Eric Tingstad & Nancy Rumbel for Acoustic Garden

=== Packaging and notes ===
- Best Recording Package
  - Kevin Reagan (art director) for Home performed by the Dixie Chicks
- Best Boxed or Special Limited Edition Package
  - Susan Archie (art director) for Screamin' and Hollerin' the Blues: The Worlds of Charley Patton performed by Charley Patton
- Best Album Notes
  - David H. Evans Jr. (notes writer) for Screamin' and Hollerin' the Blues: The Worlds of Charley Patton performed by Charley Patton

=== Polka ===
- Best Polka Album
  - Jimmy Sturr for Top of the World

=== Production and engineering ===
- Best Engineered Album, Non-Classical
  - Jay Newland & S. Husky Höskulds (engineers) for Come Away with Me performed by Norah Jones
- Best Engineered Album, Classical
  - Michael J. Bishop (engineer), Robert Spano, Norman Mackenzie (conductor), the Atlanta Symphony Orchestra & Chorus for Vaughan Williams: A Sea Symphony (Sym. No. 1)
- Best Remixed Recording, Non-Classical
  - Roger Sanchez (remixer) for "Hella Good (Roger Sanchez Remix Main)" performed by No Doubt
- Producer of the Year, Non-Classical
  - Arif Mardin
- Producer of the Year, Classical
  - Robert Woods

=== R&B ===
- Best Female R&B Vocal Performance
  - Mary J. Blige for "He Think I Don't Know"
- Best Male R&B Vocal Performance
  - Usher for "U Don't Have to Call"
- Best R&B Performance by a Duo or Group with Vocal
  - Stevie Wonder & Take 6 for "Love's in Need of Love Today" (Live)
- Best Traditional R&B Vocal Performance
  - Chaka Khan & The Funk Brothers for "What's Going On"
- Best Urban/Alternative Performance
  - India.Arie for "Little Things"
- Best R&B Song
  - Erykah Badu, Madukwu Chinwah, Rashid Lonnie Lynn (Common), Robert Ozuna, James Poyser, Raphael Saadiq & Glen Standridge (songwriters) for "Love of My Life (An Ode to Hip-Hop)" performed by Erykah Badu featuring Common
  - Michael Archer, Bobby Ozuna, Raphael Saadiq, & Glenn Standridge for "Be Here" (Raphael Saadiq featuring D'Angelo)
  - Marsha Ambrosius, Darren "Limitless" Henson, Keith "Keshon" Pelzer, & Natalie Stewart for "Floetic" (Floetry)
  - Will Baker, Andrew Ramsey, Shannon Sanders, & India Simpson for "Good Man" (India.Arie)
  - Remy Shand for "Take a Message" (Remy Shand)
- Best R&B Album
  - Alvin Speights (engineer/mixer), Shannon Sanders (producer) & India.Arie (producer & artist) for Voyage to India
- Best Contemporary R&B Album
  - Brian Springer, Milwaukee Buck aka Buck 3000 (producer/engineers/mixers), 7 Aurelius (engineer/mixer & producer), Irv Gotti (producer) & Ashanti for Ashanti

=== Rap ===
Best Female Rap Solo Performance

- "Scream a.k.a. Itchin'" – Missy Elliott
- "Diary..." – Charli Baltimore
- "Satisfaction" – Eve
- "Na Na Be Like" – Foxy Brown
- "Mystery of Iniquity" – Lauryn Hill

Best Male Rap Solo Performance

- "Hot in Herre" – Nelly
- "Without Me" – Eminem
- "Song Cry" – Jay-Z
- "Rollout (My Business)" – Ludacris
- "Bouncin' Back (Bumpin' Me Against the Wall)" – Mystikal

Best Rap Performance by a Duo or Group

- "The Whole World" – OutKast featuring Killer Mike
- "The Essence" – AZ featuring Nas
- "Still Fly" – Big Tymers
- "Pass the Courvoisier, Part II" – Busta Rhymes featuring P. Diddy & Pharrell
- "Oh Boy" – Cam'ron featuring Juelz Santana

Best Rap/Sung Collaboration

- "Dilemma" – Nelly featuring Kelly Rowland
- "What's Luv?" – Fat Joe featuring Ashanti
- "Always on Time" – Ja Rule featuring Ashanti
- "Po' Folks" – Nappy Roots featuring Anthony Hamilton
- "Like I Love You" – Justin Timberlake featuring Clipse

Best Rap Album

- The Eminem Show – Eminem
- Word of Mouf – Ludacris
- Tarantula – Mystikal
- Nellyville – Nelly
- Diary of a Sinner: 1st Entry – Petey Pablo

=== Reggae ===
- Best Reggae Album
  - Lee 'Scratch' Perry for Jamaican E.T.

=== Rock ===
- Best Female Rock Vocal Performance
  - Sheryl Crow for "Steve McQueen"
- Best Male Rock Vocal Performance
  - Bruce Springsteen for "The Rising"
- Best Rock Performance by a Duo or Group with Vocal
  - Coldplay for "In My Place"
- Best Rock Instrumental Performance
  - The Flaming Lips for "Approaching Pavonis Mons By Balloon (Utopia Planitia)"
- Best Hard Rock Performance
  - Foo Fighters for "All My Life"
- Best Metal Performance
  - Korn for "Here to Stay"
- Best Rock Song
  - Bruce Springsteen (songwriter) for "The Rising"
- Best Rock Album
  - Nick Didia (engineer/mixer), Brendan O'Brien (engineer/mixer & producer) & Bruce Springsteen for The Rising

=== Spoken ===
- Best Spoken Word Album
  - Charles B. Potter (producer) & Maya Angelou for A Song Flung Up to Heaven
- Best Spoken Word Comedy Album
  - Nathaniel Kunkel (engineer/mixer), Peter Asher (producer) & Robin Williams for Robin Williams - Live 2002

=== Traditional pop ===
- Best Traditional Pop Vocal Album
  - Joel Moss, Tom Young (engineers/mixers), Phil Ramone (producer) & Tony Bennett for Playin' with My Friends: Bennett Sings the Blues

=== World ===
- Best World Music Album
  - Oscar Marin (engineer/mixer), Walter Flores (engineer/mixer & producer) & Rubén Blades (producer & artist) for Mundo

== In memoriam ==
- Derek Bell
- Bill Berry
- Otis Blackwell
- Hadda Brooks
- Ray Brown (musician)
- Rosemary Clooney
- Ray Conniff
- Tom Dowd
- Gus Dudgeon
- John Entwistle
- Erma Franklin
- Adolph Green
- Billy Guy
- Lionel Hampton
- Harlan Howard
- Jam Master Jay
- Waylon Jennings
- Peggy Lee
- Alan Lomax
- Lisa Lopes
- Arthur Lyman
- Peter Matz
- Jim McReynolds
- Mickey Newbury
- Dee Dee Ramone
- Mongo Santamaría
- Layne Staley
- Dave Van Ronk
- Timothy White
- Zal Yanovsky
- Joe Strummer

== Special merit awards ==
=== Lifetime Achievement Award ===
- Etta James
- Johnny Mathis
- Glenn Miller
- Tito Puente
- Simon & Garfunkel

=== Trustees Award ===
- Alan Lomax
- The New York Philharmonic

=== Legend Award ===
- Bee Gees

=== Technical Grammy ===
- Individual Contributions
  - Geoff Emerick
- Company Contributions
  - Shure Incorporated

=== MusiCares Person of the Year ===
- Bono

=== Grammy Hall of Fame Award ===
- Aja (ABC, 1977) performed by Steely Dan
- "Blowin' in the Wind" (Warner Bros., 1963) performed by Peter, Paul and Mary
- Born to Run (Columbia, 1975) performed by Bruce Springsteen
- "Both Sides, Now" (Elektra, 1968) performed by Judy Collins
- "Days of Wine and Roses" (RCA, 1962) performed by Henry Mancini
- "Downtown" (Warner Bros., 1964) performed by Petula Clark
- Genius of Modern Music: Volume 1 (Blue Note, 1951) performed by Thelonious Monk
- Genius of Modern Music: Volume 2 (Blue Note, 1952) performed by Thelonious Monk
- Goodbye Yellow Brick Road (DJM, 1973) performed by Elton John
- "Hotel California" (Asylum, 1977) performed by Eagles
- "I Only Have Eyes for You" (End, 1959) performed by The Flamingos
- "I Shot the Sheriff" (RSO, 1974) performed by Eric Clapton
- "It's Too Late" (Ode, 1971) performed by Carole King
- "Lady Marmalade" (Epic, 1974) performed by Labelle worked from the album Nightbirds
- "Proud Mary" (Liberty, 1970) performed by Ike & Tina Turner worked from the album Workin' Together.
- Rumors (Warner Bros., 1977) performed by Fleetwood Mac
- Shostakovich: Violin Concerto No. 1 in A Minor Op. 99 (Sony Classical, 1956) performed by David Oistrakh with New York Philharmonic conducted by Dimitri Mitropoulos
- "Stairway to Heaven" (Atlantic, 1971) performed by Led Zeppelin
- Still Crazy After All These Years (Columbia Records, 1975) performed by Paul Simon
- "Stormy Weather" (Brunswick, 1933) performed by Ethel Waters
- "Up, Up and Away" (Soul City, 1967) performed by The 5th Dimension
