= Grammy Award for Best Spoken Word Album for Children =

Award for the best spoken children album

- Awarded for: Quality spoken word performances aimed at children
- Country: United States
- Presented by: National Academy of Recording Arts and Sciences
- First award: 1994
- Final award: 2011
- Website: grammy.com

The Grammy Award for Best Spoken Word Album for Children was an honor presented at the Grammy Awards, a ceremony that was established in 1958 and originally called the Gramophone Awards, to recording artists for works containing quality "spoken word" performances aimed at children. Honors in several categories are presented at the ceremony annually by the National Academy of Recording Arts and Sciences of the United States to "honor artistic achievement, technical proficiency and overall excellence in the recording industry, without regard to album sales or chart position."

The award was first presented to Audrey Hepburn and producers Deborah Raffin and Michael Viner in 1994 for the album Audrey Hepburn's Enchanted Tales. Its last winners were the artists, producers, audio engineers, and audio mixers who contributed to the album Julie Andrews' Collection of Poems, Songs, and Lullabies in 2011, when it was announced the award would be combined with the Grammy Award for Best Musical Album for Children to form the Grammy Award for Best Children's Album.

Tom Chapin holds the record for the most wins in this category, with a total of three. Artists Bill Harley and Jim Dale, along with audio engineer David Correia, and producers Arnold Cardillo and David Rapkin, and audio engineer-musical director Rory Young, are the others to win the award more than once, all winning it twice. Former U.S. President Bill Clinton has also won the award, along with Mikhail Gorbachev and Sophia Loren, for their work on the album Wolf Tracks and Peter and the Wolf at the 2003 installment of the awards.

== Recipients ==
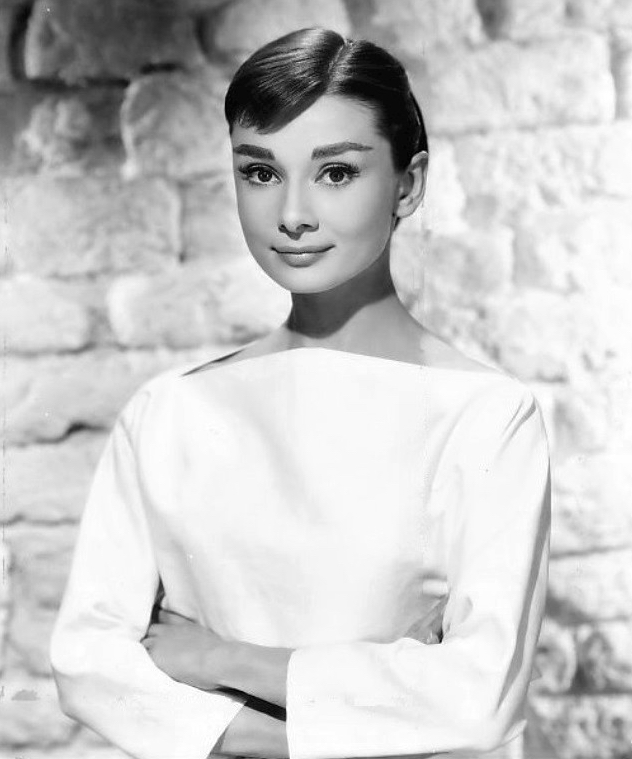
Audrey Hepburn, 1994 winner

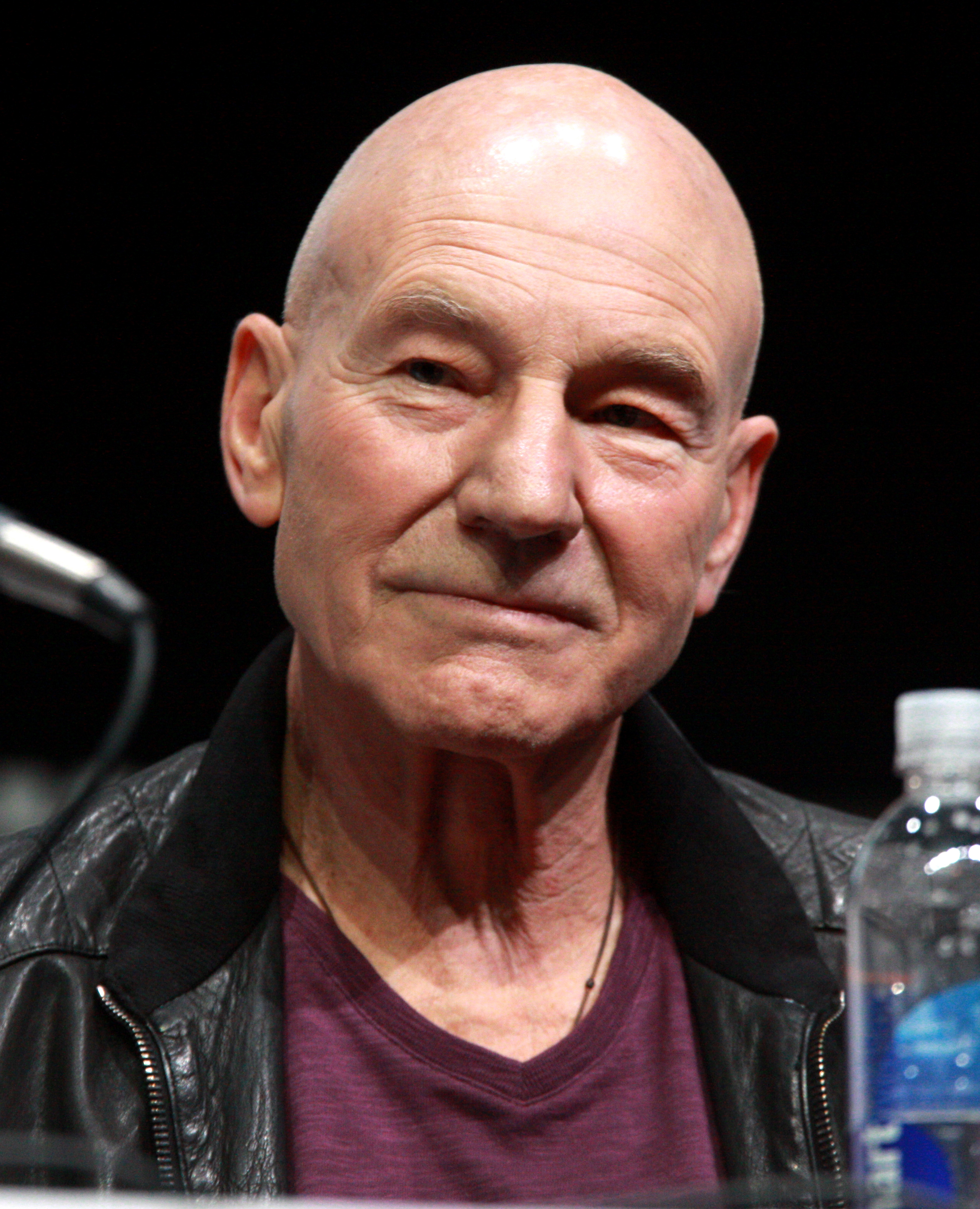
Patrick Stewart, 1996 winner

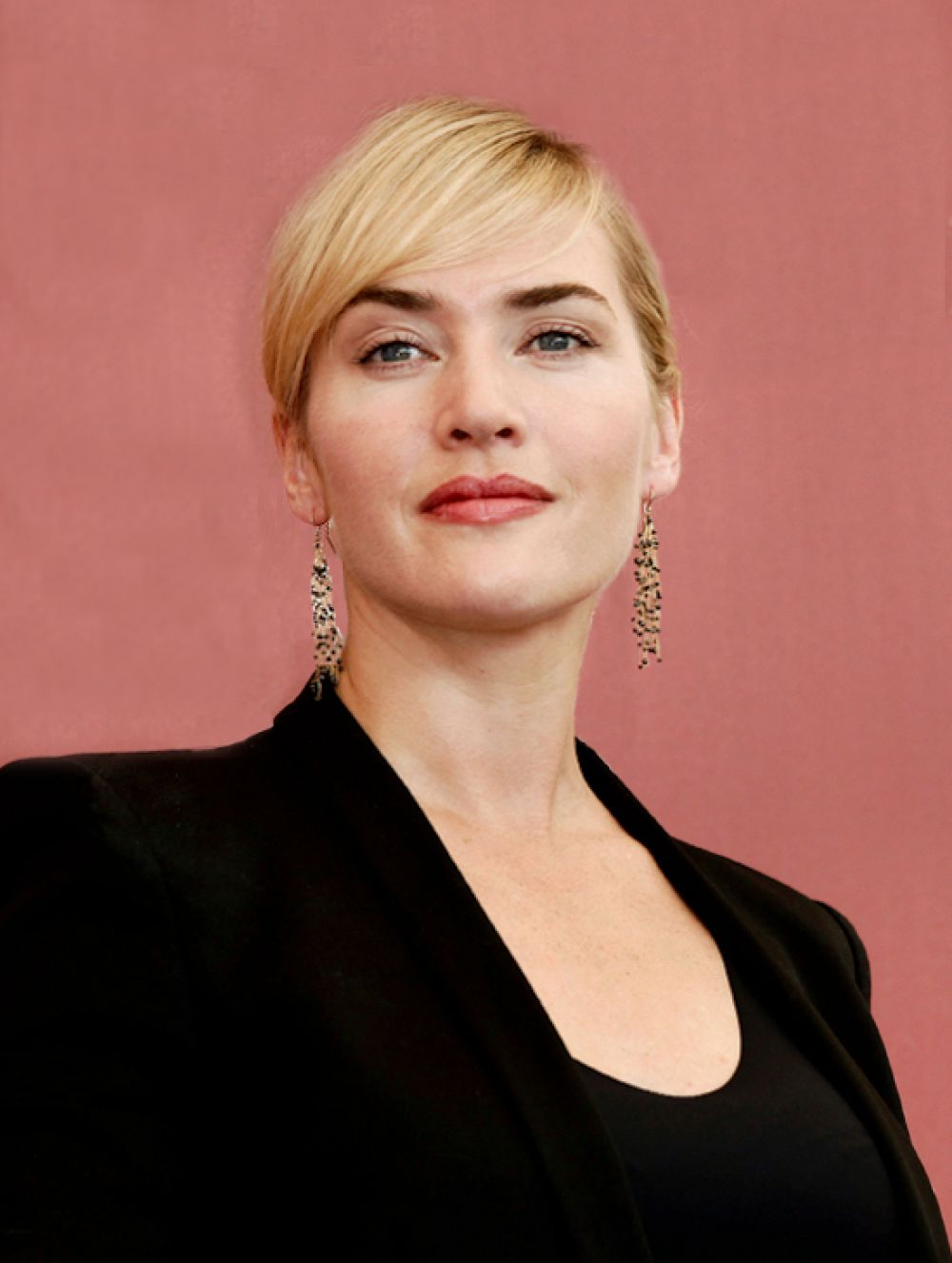
Kate Winslet, 2000 winner

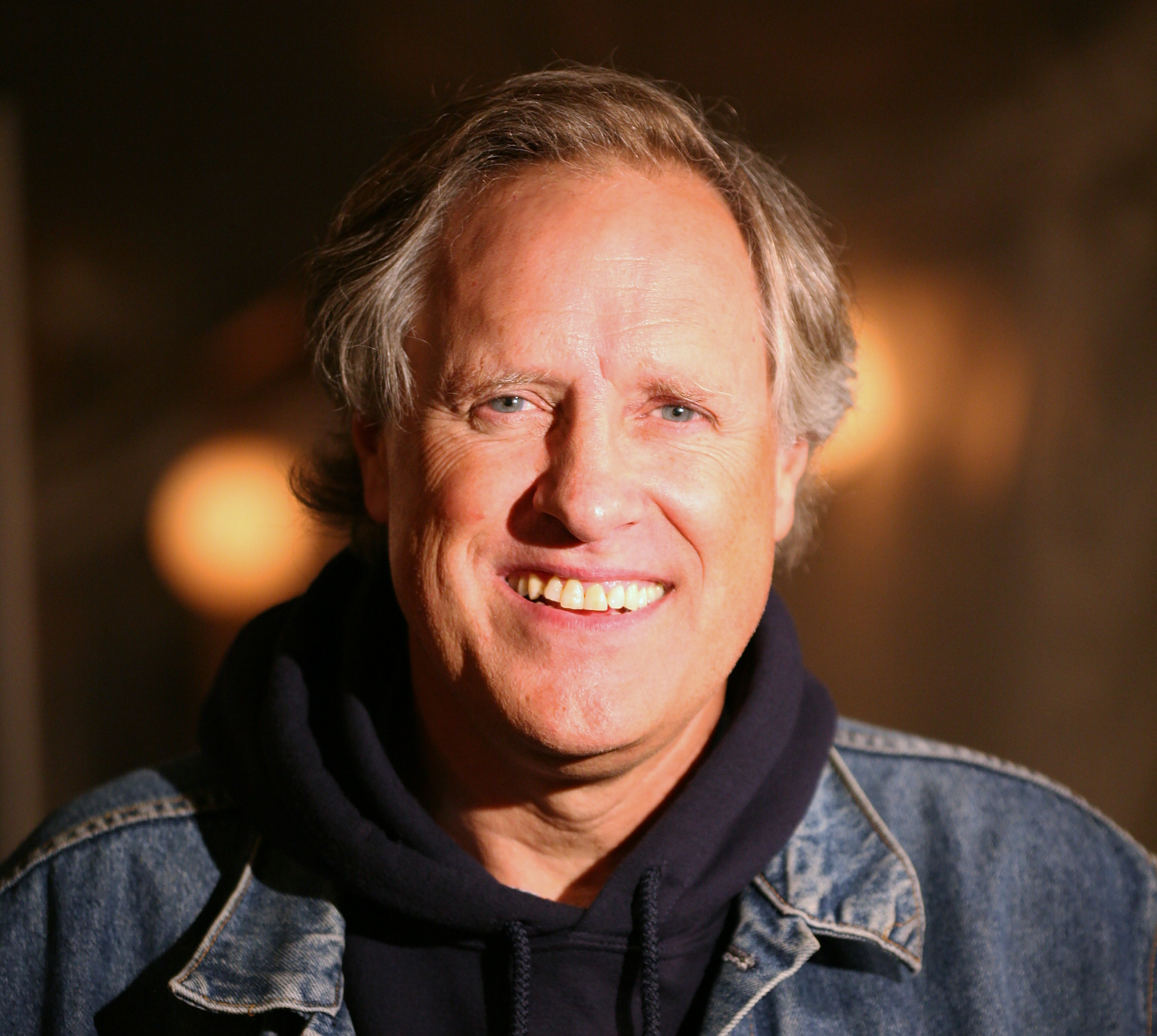
2002, 2003, and 2005 award winner Tom Chapin

2004 award winner Bill Clinton

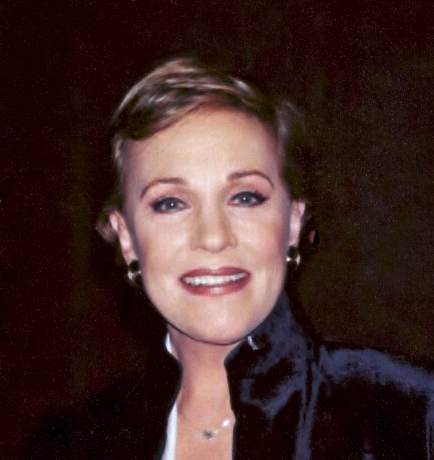
2011 award winner Dame Julie Andrews

=== 1990s ===
Year	Performing Artist(s)	Work	Producers
1994	Audrey Hepburn	Audrey Hepburn's Enchanted Tales	Deborah Raffin and Michael Viner
1994	John Cleese	Did I Ever Tell You How Lucky You Are? (Dr. Seuss)	Sharon Lerner
1994	Danny Glover and Dr. John	Brer Rabbit and Boss Lion	Dr. John, Ken Hoin, and Doris Wilhousky
1994	Sesame Street Muppets	The Muppet Christmas Carol Story Album	Ed Mitchell
1994	Various artists	Aladdin Sound and Story Theater	Ted Kryczko
1995	Various artists (Note: Including Robert Guillaume as the narrator.)	The Lion King Read-Along	Randy Thornton and Ted Kryczko
1995	Amy Grant	The Creation	Bela Fleck, Brian Gleeson, and Craig Rogers
1995	John Hurt	Aladdin and the Magic Lamp	Brian Gleeson, Mickey Hart, and C.W. Rogers
1995	Garrison Keillor	Johnny Appleseed	Ken Hoin and Mark O'Connor
1995	Various artists	The Magic School Bus: Fun With Sound	John Wynne
1996	Patrick Stewart	Prokofiev: Peter and the Wolf	Dan Broatman and Martin Sauer
1996	Morgan Freeman	Follow the Drinking Gourd	Taj Mahal, John McCally, and Doris Wilhousky
1996	David Holt and Bill Mooney	Why the Dog Chases the Cat: Great Animal Stories	David Holt and Bill Mooney
1996	B.B. King and Denzel Washington	John Henry	B.B. King and Doris Wilhousky
1996	Winona Ryder	The Diary of a Young Girl	Lauren Krenzel
1997	David Holt	Stellaluna	Steven Heller, David Holt, and Virginia Callaway
1997	Melissa Manchester	The Wonderful O (James Thurber)	Deborah Raffin
1997	Carl Reiner	The Prince and the Pauper (Mark Twain)	Victoria Preminger
1997	Robin Williams	Jumanji (Chris Van Allsburg)	Susan Dudnick Boer
1997	Michael York	Treasure Island (Robert Louis Stevenson)	Shauna Zurbrugg
1998	Charles Kuralt	Winnie-the-Pooh (A. A. Milne)	John McElroy
1998	Long John Baldry	The Original Story of Winnie-the-Pooh	
1998	Gabriel Byrne	The Star-Child and the Nightingale & the Rose	
1998	Eric Idle	The Quite Remarkable Adventures of the Owl and the Pussycat	
1999	Various artists (Note: (Jim Belushi, Robert Davi, Tate Donovan, Linda Hamilton, Patrick MacNee, Bill Pullman, Daphne Zuniga))	The Children's Shakespeare	Dan Musselman and Stefan Rudnicki
1999	Miguel Ferrer	Disney's The Lion King II: Simba's Pride Read-Along	Randy Thornton
1999	June Foray	Disney's Mulan Read and Sing Along	Ted Kryczko and Randy Thornton
1999	Bill Harley	Weezie and the Moon Pies	Bill Harley
1999	Sharon Kennedy	The Patchwork Quilt and Other Stories From Around the World	Bing Broderick, Kennedy and Steve Netsky
1999	Sesame Street Muppets	Elmo's New Laugh	Ed Mitchell

=== 2000s ===
Year	Performing Artist(s)	Work	Producers
2000	Graham Greene, Wynton Marsalis, and Kate Winslet	Listen to the Storyteller	David Frost and Steven Epstein
2000	Jim Dale	Harry Potter and the Sorcerer's Stone	Kathy Hale
2000	Bill Harley	The Battle of Mad Scientists and Other Tales of Survival	Debbie Block and Bill Harley
2000	Hayden Panettiere	A Bug's Life Read-Along	Randy Thornton and Ted Kryczko
2000	Sesame Street Muppets	Let's Eat!	Ed Mitchell
2001	Jim Dale	Harry Potter and the Goblet of Fire	David Rapkin
2001	James Earl Jones	The Christmas Miracle of Jonathan Toomey	
2001	Liam Neeson	The Polar Express	
2001	Paul Newman	The Adventures of Tom Sawyer	
2001	Susan Sarandon	Dinosongs: Poems to Celebrate a T. Rex Named Sue	
2002	Tom Chapin	Mama Don't Allow	Arnold Cardillo, producer. Rory Young, audio engineer
2002	Tim Curry	A Series of Unfortunate Events – Book 1: The Bad Beginning	
2002	Vanessa Redgrave and Stephen Fry	Oscar Wilde: The Selfish Giant & The Nightingale And The Rose	
2002	Various artists	Dr. Seuss – How the Grinch Stole Christmas!	
2002	Ruth Westheimer	Timeless Tales and Music of Our Time	
2003	Tom Chapin	There Was an Old Lady Who Swallowed a Fly	
2003	Jamie Lee Curtis	The Jamie Lee Curtis Audio Collection	
2003	John Lithgow and various artists	Ogden Nash's the Christmas That Almost Wasn't	
2003	Jerry Seinfeld	Halloween	
2003	Various artists	Monsters, Inc. DVD Read-Along	
2004	Bill Clinton, Mikhail Gorbachev, and Sophia Loren	Prokofiev: Peter and the Wolf/Beintus: Wolf Tracks	Wilhelm Hellweg, producer. Jean-Marie Geijsen, audio engineer.
2004	Jim Broadbent	Winnie-the-Pooh	
2004	Jim Dale	Harry Potter and the Order of the Phoenix	
2004	Eric Idle	Charlie and the Chocolate Factory	
2004	Carl Reiner	Tell Me a Scary Story	
2005	Tom Chapin	The Train They Call the City of New Orleans	Arnold Cardillo, producer. Rory Young, audio engineer.
2005	Marin Alsop	The Story of Classical Music	
2005	John Lithgow	The Emperor's New Clothes	
2005	Various artists	Green Eggs and Ham and Other Servings of Dr. Seuss	
2005	Elaine Stritch	The Best Halloween Ever	
2006	Various artists	Marlo Thomas & Friends: Thanks & Giving All Year Long	Christopher B. Cerf and Marlo Thomas, producers. Nick Cipriano, audio engineer.
2006	Jim Dale	Harry Potter and the Half-Blood Prince	
2006	Roy Dotrice	Pooh's Heffalump	
2006	Ray Romano	Raymie, Dickie, and the Bean: Why I Love and Hate My Brothers	
2006	Various artists	A Series of Unfortunate Events: The Bad Beginning	David Rapkin
2007	Bill Harley	Blah Blah Blah: Stories About Clams, Swamp Monsters, Pirates and Dogs	David Correia, audio engineer
2007	Jim Dale	Peter Pan	
2007	John McCutcheon	Christmas in the Trenches	
2007	Lynn Redgrave	The Witches	
2007	Various artists	Disney's Little Einsteins Musical Missions	
2008	Jim Dale	Harry Potter and the Deathly Hallows	Orli Moscowitz and David Rapkin, producers
2008	Milbre Burch	Making the Heart Whole Again: Stories for a Wounded World	
2008	Diane Ferlatte	Wickety Whack – Brer Rabbit Is Back	
2008	Toni Morrison	Who's Got Game? The Ant or the Grasshopper? The Lion or the Mouse? Poppy or the Snake?	
2008	Stanley Tucci and Meryl Streep	The One and Only Shrek	
2009	Bill Harley	Yes to Running! Bill Harley Live	Daniel P. Dauterive, producer
2009	Buck Howdy and BB	Around the Campfire	
2009	Gwyneth Paltrow	Brown Bear and Friends	
2009	Dean Pitchford	The Big One-Oh	
2009	Tony Shalhoub	The Cricket in Times Square	

=== 2010s ===
Year	Performing Artist(s)	Work	Producers
2010	Buck Howdy	Aaaaah! Spooky, Scary Stories & Songs	Buck Howdy, producer
2010	Ed Asner	Scat	
2010	Harlan Ellison	Through the Looking-Glass and What Alice Found There	
2010	David Hyde Pierce	The Phantom Tollbooth	
2010	Dean Pitchford	Captain Nobody	
2010	Various artists	Nelson Mandela's Favorite African Folktales	
2011	Julie Andrews and Emma Walton Hamilton	Julie Andrews' Collection of Poems, Songs, and Lullabies	Michele McGonigle, producer.
2011	Selma Blair	Anne Frank: The Diary of a Young Girl: The Definitive Edition	
2011	Bill Harley	The Best Candy in the Whole World	
2011	Emma Thompson	Nanny McPhee Returns	
2011	Various artists	Healthy Food for Thought: Good Enough to Eat	

== See also ==
- Grammy Award for Best Spoken Word Album
