= The Watson Family =

Live album by Doc Watson
- Released: 1963 (original LP release)
- Recorded: 1960–65, 1976
- Genre: Folk
- Length: 60:38
- Label: Folkways
- Producer: Jeff Place, Ralph Rinzler

Doc Watson chronology
The Watson Family (1963)	Treasures Untold (1964)

The Watson Family is a recording by American folk music artist Doc Watson and The Watson Family, originally released in 1963.

The Watson Family is taken from field recordings by Ralph Rinzler, Eugene W. Earle, Archie Green, and Peter Siegel, done from 1960 to 1963. It was re-released on Smithsonian Folkways on CD in 1990 with additional tracks from the 1970s.

== Reception ==
Professional ratings
Review scores
Source	Rating
AllMusic	4.5/5 stars

Writing for Allmusic, music critic Brian Whitener wrote the album "This Smithsonian Folkways release captures not only Doc Watson, but almost a dozen family members at the height of their power and has been deservingly hailed as a classic recording... A fabulous record that's a must-listen for any serious fan of American music."

== Track listing ==
All songs Traditional unless otherwise noted.

1. "Ground Hog" – 2:21
2. "Every Day Dirt" – 2:08
3. "Bonaparte's Retreat" – 1:31
4. "The House Carpenter" – 4:33
5. "I'm Troubled" – 2:42
6. "Your Long Journey" (Rosa Lee Watson, A.L. Watson) – 2:36
7. "When I Die" – 2:17
8. "That Train That Carried My Girl From Town" – 2:20
9. "Down the Road" – 1:41
10. "The Lone Pilgrim" – 3:08
11. "Texas Gales/Blackberry Rag" – 1:58
12. "Darling Corey" – 2:37
13. "The Triplett Tragedy" (Ed Miller) – 5:31
14. "Muddy Roads" – 1:24
15. "The Lost Soul" – 3:01
  CD re-issue additional tracks:
16. "Keep in the Middle of the Road" – 1:14
17. "The Old Man Below" – 1:35
18. "Pretty Saro" – 1:42
19. "Cousin Sally Brown" – 2:20
20. "Look Down That Lonesome Road" – 2:06
21. "Doodle Bug" – 1:02
22. "Rambling Hobo" – 1:38
23. "The Cuckoo" – 3:03
24. "Frosty Morn" – 1:41
25. "Shady Grove" – 2:17
26. "Southbound" (Merle Watson, Ryerson) – 2:40

== Personnel ==
- Doc Watson – guitar, banjo, mandolin, autoharp, vocals
- Merle Watson – guitar, banjo
- Gaither Carlton – banjo, fiddle, vocals
- Dolly Greer – vocals
- Sophronie Miller Greer – vocals
- Annie Watson – vocals
- Arnold Watson – banjo, harmonica, vocals
- Rosa Lee Watson – vocals
- Willard Watson – banjo
- Ralph Rinzler – guitar

Production notes

- Eugene Earle – engineer
- David Glasser – digital editing
- Archie Green – engineer
- Mickey Hart – technical advisor
- Suzanne Holder – assistant
- Jeff Place – producer, liner notes
- Ralph Rinzler – producer, engineer, executive producer
- Mike Seeger – assistant
- Peter Siegel – engineer
- Lorrie Taylor – assistant
- Bob Yellin – photography, cover photo
