= Treasures Untold =

Live album by Doc Watson and Family
- Released: 1964
- Recorded: 1964 Newport Folk Festival
- Genre: Folk, blues
- Length: 44:10
- Label: Vanguard
- Producer: Mary Katherine Aldin (Compilation Producer)

Doc Watson chronology
The Watson Family (1963)	Treasures Untold (1964)	Doc Watson (1965)

Treasures Untold is the title of a live recording by Doc Watson & Family, recorded at the 1964 Newport Folk Festival. It includes four duets with Clarence White. Watson's son, Merle, was 15 years old at the time of the recording. He later performed numerous concerts and on recordings with his father.

It was released on CD in 1991 by Vanguard.

== Reception ==
Professional ratings
Review scores
Source	Rating
Allmusic	4.5/5 stars

Writing for Allmusic, music critic Thom Owen wrote the album "At the concert, Doc Watson and his family were in fine form, breathing life into a number of old-timey songs, ranging from ballads to folk songs to gospel. It's an exciting, affectionate performance, highlighted by four duets with Clarence White."

== Track listing ==
All tracks Traditional unless otherwise noted.

1. "Introduction" – 3:16
2. "Lights in the Valley" – 3:49
3. "Beaumont Rag" – 1:23
4. "I Heard My Mother Weeping" – 3:31
5. "Billy in the Low Ground" – 1:36
6. "Omie Wise" – 4:20
7. "Reuben's Train" – 2:49
8. "Hicks' Farewell" – 4:00
9. "Rambling Hobo" – 1:41
10. "White House Blues" – 1:38
11. "Jimmy Sutton/The Old Buck Ram" – :58
12. "I Want to Love Him More" – 2:35
13. "Grandfather's Clock" (Henry Clay Work) – 1:39
14. "Chinese Breakdown" – 1:08
15. "Handsome Molly" – 2:21
  Duets with Clarence White:
16. "Beaumont Rag" – 1:58
17. "Farewell Blues" – 1:59
18. "Lonesome Road Blues" – 1:16
19. "Footprints in the Snow" – 2:13

== Personnel ==
- Doc Watson – guitar, banjo, harmonica, autoharp, vocals
- Gaither Carlton – banjo, fiddle, vocals
- Arnold Watson – banjo, vocals
- Clarence White - guitar
- Merle Watson – guitar
- Mrs. General Dixon Watson – vocals
- Rosa Lee Watson – vocals

Production notes

- Mary Katherine Aldin – liner notes, compilation producer
- Georgette Cartwright – pre-production coordinator
- Kent Crawford – compilation executive producer
- Al Maxwell – photography
- Susanne Smolka – design
- Captain Jeff Zaraya – mixing, compilation engineer
