= Legacy (Doc Watson album) =

Compilation album by Doc Watson
- Released: April 9, 2002
- Genre: Folk, country blues
- Label: High Windy
- Producer: David Holt, Steven Heller

Doc Watson chronology
Round the Table Again (2002)	Legacy (2002)	Tennessee Stud (2003)

Professional ratings
Review scores
Source	Rating
AllMusic	4.5/5 stars

Legacy is the title of a recording by American folk music and country blues artist Doc Watson and David Holt, released in 2002.

This three-disc set includes two CDs of interviews with Watson interspersed with music. Watson discusses his upbringing and career as well as his musical roots. The third disc is a live recording of a concert recorded at the Diana Wortham Theatre in Asheville, NC, in 2001. A 72-page booklet including song notes and rare photographs is also included.

At the Grammy Awards of 2003, Legacy won the 2002 Grammy Award for Best Traditional Folk Album.

== Track listing ==
1. "Cousin Sally Brown" (Traditional) – 1:13
2. "Interview: I Played Like the Rest of the Boys" – 2:37
3. "Interview: Dad Was a Harmonica Player" – 6:33
4. "Interview: The King's Treasure" – 6:38
5. "Deep River Blues" (Traditional) – 4:02
6. "Interview: Cat With Ten Lives" – 1:54
7. "Ruben's Train" (Traditional) – 2:29
8. "Interview: Learn to Pick It Good" – 2:32
9. "Georgie Buck" (Traditional) – 0:57
10. "Darlin' Cory" (Traditional) – 1:15
11. "Interview: Doc's First Guitar" – 2:51
12. "When the Roses Bloom in Dixieland" (Carter) – 5:52
13. "Interview: Leaving Home" – 3:14
14. "Never No Mo' Blues" (Jimmie Rodgers) – 1:41
15. "Interview: Wood Sheddin'" – 1:49
16. "Beaumont Rag" (Traditional) – 2:55
17. "Interview: Fingerstyle Guitar" – 0:55
18. "Freight Train" (Cotten) – 0:57
19. "Sitting on Top of the World" (Sam Chatmon, Walter Vinson) – 0:50
20. "Interview: Playin' on the Street" – 2:15
21. "Down the Road" (Flatt, Scruggs) – 2:58
22. "Bury Me Beneath the Willow" (Carter) – 2:24
23. "Interview: The Woman From Wildcat" – 5:32
24. "Interview: The Legend of Tom Dooley" – 2:30
25. "Tom Dooley" (Traditional) – 3:26
26. "Interview: Hitting the Road" – 6:46
27. "Interview: Going Solo" – 1:53
28. "Interview: Top of the Heap" – 4:50
29. "Tennessee Stud" (Jimmy Driftwood) – 4:37
30. "Interview: Building Bridges" – 4:08
31. "Ready for the Times to Get Better" (Reynolds) – 1:57
32. "Interview: Living the Blues" – 4:37
33. "Interview: Blessed" – 0:57
34. "Rolling in My Sweet Baby's Arms" – 2:35
35. "Whiskey Before Breakfast" / "Ragtime Annie" (Traditional) – 4:00
36. "Shady Grove" (Traditional) – 3:06
37. "Whoop 'Em Up Cindy" – 3:07
38. "Otto Wood" – 4:08
39. "Interview: Dad Taught Me to Play the Harmonica" – 0:33
40. "Old Molly Hare" (Traditional) – 0:54
41. "Home Sweet Home" (Traditional) – 3:17
42. "Railroad Bill" – 3:00
43. "Train That Carried My Girl From Town" – 5:11
44. "Walk On" (Brownie McGhee) – 2:31
45. "Interview: Bantar Vs. Gitjo" – 1:37
46. "Don't Get Weary" – 2:38
47. "Black-Eyed Susie" – 2:45
48. "The Telephone Girl (Orville Reid) 2:24
49. "Stand By Me" (Ernest Tubb) – 2:22
50. "Just to Ease My Worried Mind" (Roy Acuff) – 3:11
51. "Raincrow Bill/Hambone Rhythm" (Traditional) – 3:01
52. "I Got the Blues and I Can't Be Satisfied" (Traditional) – 4:24

== Personnel ==
- Doc Watson – guitar, harmonica, vocals, banjo
- David Holt - banjo, guitar, vocals
- Richard Watson – guitar, banjo

Production notes

- David Holt – producer
- Steven Heller – producer, engineer, mastering and mixing
- Travis Leonard – assistant engineer
- Nathan Milner – assistant engineer
- Virginia Callaway – project coordinator
- Brad Campbell – editorial assistant
