= Blind But Now I See =

2010 biography

Blind But Now I See: The Biography of Music Legend Doc Watson
- First edition
- Author: Kent Gustavson
- Language: English
- Genre: Biography
- Publisher: Blooming Twig Books Sumach-Red Books
- Publication date: April 2010 (1st ed.) 1 March 2012 (2nd ed.)
- Publication place: United States
- Media type: E-book, Print (Paperback)
- ISBN: 978-1-933918-87-7 (1st ed.); 978-1-937753-00-9 (2nd ed.)

Blind But Now I See: The Biography of Music Legend Doc Watson is a book written by Kent Gustavson. The book serves as a comprehensive biography of the late guitarist and singer-songwriter Doc Watson (1923–2012).

== Description ==
The book uses a variety of sources to tell the story of Watson's life and musical career, including historical archives, interviews, and news/media material. There is a particularly strong emphasis on interviews with people familiar with Watson; the book features interviews with around 100 of Watson's friends and collaborators.

Additionally, the book features a collection of quotations by various well-known people regarding Doc Watson, including former presidents Jimmy Carter and Bill Clinton and musicians Bob Dylan, Ben Harper, Chet Atkins, Béla Fleck, Warren Haynes, Ketch Secor of Old Crow Medicine Show, and Ricky Skaggs, among others.

== Reception and awards ==
The book has been well received by critics and fans of Watson's music, with many critics praising the extensive research and detail put into the book. Greg Yost of Country Standard Time stated that "Gustavson uses his academic background to present an extensively researched and fairly even accounting of the artist's life." Dustin Ogdin of No Depression additionally praises the extensive research into both the positive and negative aspects of Watson's life and career.

The book won the 2011 Next Generation Indie Book Award for best biography and was a 2010 finalist in the ForeWord Magazine book of the year awards.

== Release history ==
The first edition of the book was released in April 2010 by Blooming Twig Books and a second edition was released in March 2012 by Sumach-Red Books.

Gustavson is currently working on an expanded third edition of the book, addressing Watson's death and featuring new interviews and photographs.

== List of interviews ==
The following is a selected list of people interviewed for the book:

- Annie Bird
- Norman Blake
- Greg Brown
- Sam Bush
- Jonathan Byrd
- Guy Clark
- Michael Cleveland
- John Cohen
- Dan Crary
- Guy Davis
- Pat Donohue
- Jerry Douglas
- Stuart Duncan
- Tommy Emmanuel
- Tim Eriksen
- Béla Fleck
- Bill Frisell
- Don Gallagher
- Alice Gerrard
- Ben Harper
- Warren Haynes
- Beppe Gambetta
- David Grisman
- Si Kahn
- Steve Kaufman
- Jack Lawrence
- Larry Long
- Taj Mahal
- Edgar Meyer
- Paddy Moloney
- Maria Muldaur
- Alan O'Bryant
- Tom Paxton
- Tony Rice
- Don Rigsby
- Jean Ritchie
- Tao Rodríguez-Seeger
- Peter Rowan
- Ketch Secor
- Mike Seeger
- Peggy Seeger
- Michelle Shocked
- Marty Stuart
- B. Townes
- Tony Trischka
- Abigail Washburn
- Roland White
- Robin Williams
