= Doc Watson (album) =

Debut album by Doc Watson

Studio album by Doc Watson
- Released: 1964
- Genre: Folk, blues
- Length: 35:10
- Label: Vanguard

Doc Watson chronology
Treasures Untold (1964)	Doc Watson (1964)	Doc Watson and Son (1965)

Doc Watson is the debut album by Doc Watson, released by Vanguard Records in 1964. The musical supervision was credited to Ralph Rinzler.

It was re-issued on CD by Ace Records in 1995 and numerous tracks have been used in compilations such as Vanguard Years and The Best of Doc Watson 1964-1968.

In celebration of Vanguard Records 60th Anniversary in 2010, it was re-issued with original artwork on a limited edition 180 gram vinyl record pressing of 500 copies for Record Store Day on April 17.

In 2025, Heady Wax Fiends re-issued the album in its original Mono form on vinyl in two colored variants. 500 "Ol' Hoss" colored variants were distributed to subscribers of Heady Wax Fiends Record Club and 500 "Black Mountain" colored variants were made available on the Heady Wax Fiends website.

== Reception ==
Professional ratings
Review scores
Source	Rating
Allmusic	5/5 stars

Writing for Allmusic, music critic Jim Smith wrote of the album "The album is incredibly varied, from the stark, banjo-driven "Country Blues" to the humorous "Intoxicated Rat," and many of these songs became Watson standards, especially his signature song "Black Mountain Rag." His incredible flat-picking skills may have been what initially wowed his audiences, but it was Watson's complete mastery of the folk idiom that assured his lasting popularity."

== Track listing ==
1. "Nashville Blues" (Alton Delmore, Rabon Delmore) – 1:55
2. "Sitting on Top of the World" (Sam Chatmon, Walter Vinson) – 2:35
3. "Intoxicated Rat" (Dorsey Dixon, Mainer) – 2:28
4. "Country Blues" (Dock Boggs) – 3:26
5. "Talk About Suffering" (Traditional) – 2:45
6. "Born About Six Thousand Years Ago" (Traditional) – 2:57
7. "Black Mountain Rag" (Traditional) – 1:29
8. "Omie Wise" (Traditional) – 4:23
9. "Georgie Buck" (Traditional) – 2:13
10. "Doc's Guitar" (Doc Watson) – 1:14
11. "Deep River Blues" (Traditional) – 3:07
12. "St. James Hospital" (James "Iron Head" Baker) – 3:25
13. "Tom Dooley" (Traditional) – 3:13

== Personnel ==
- Doc Watson – guitar, banjo, harmonica, vocals
- John Herald - second guitar on Nashville Blues and Black Mountain Rag
