= Newport Folk Festival =

Annual American music festival in Rhode Island

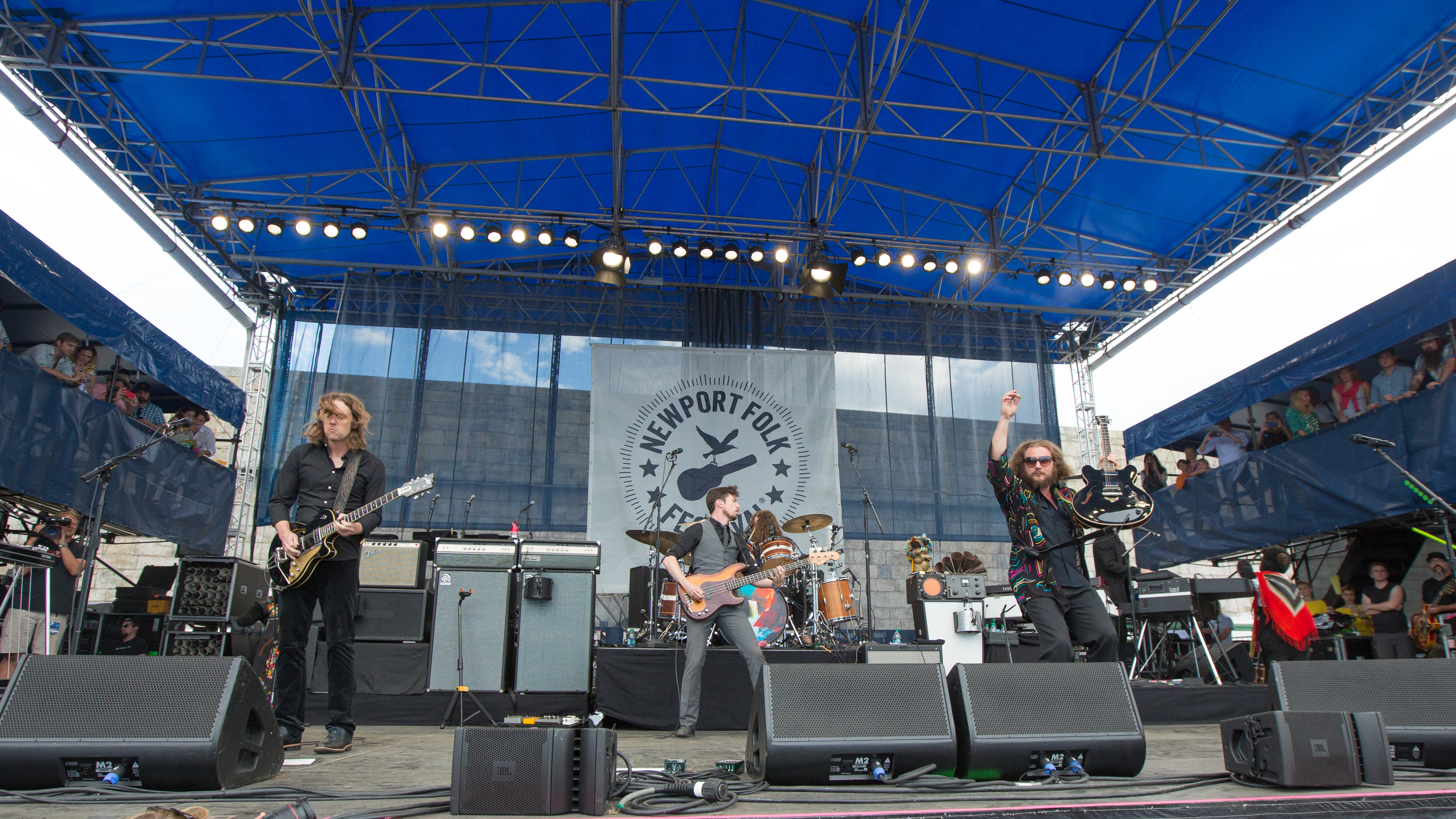
- My Morning Jacket performing at the festival in 2015
- Genre: Contemporary folk music and other genres
- Venue: Fort Adams State Park
- Locations: Newport, Rhode Island, U.S.
- Coordinates: 41.478056°N 71.335556°W
- Years active: 1959–1960, 1963–1969, 1985–present
- Inaugurated: July 11, 1959
- Founders: George Wein, Pete Seeger, Albert Grossman, Theodore Bikel, Oscar Brand
- Most recent: July 24, 2026 – July 26, 2026
- Next event: July 23, 2027 – July 25, 2027
- Website: newportfolk.org

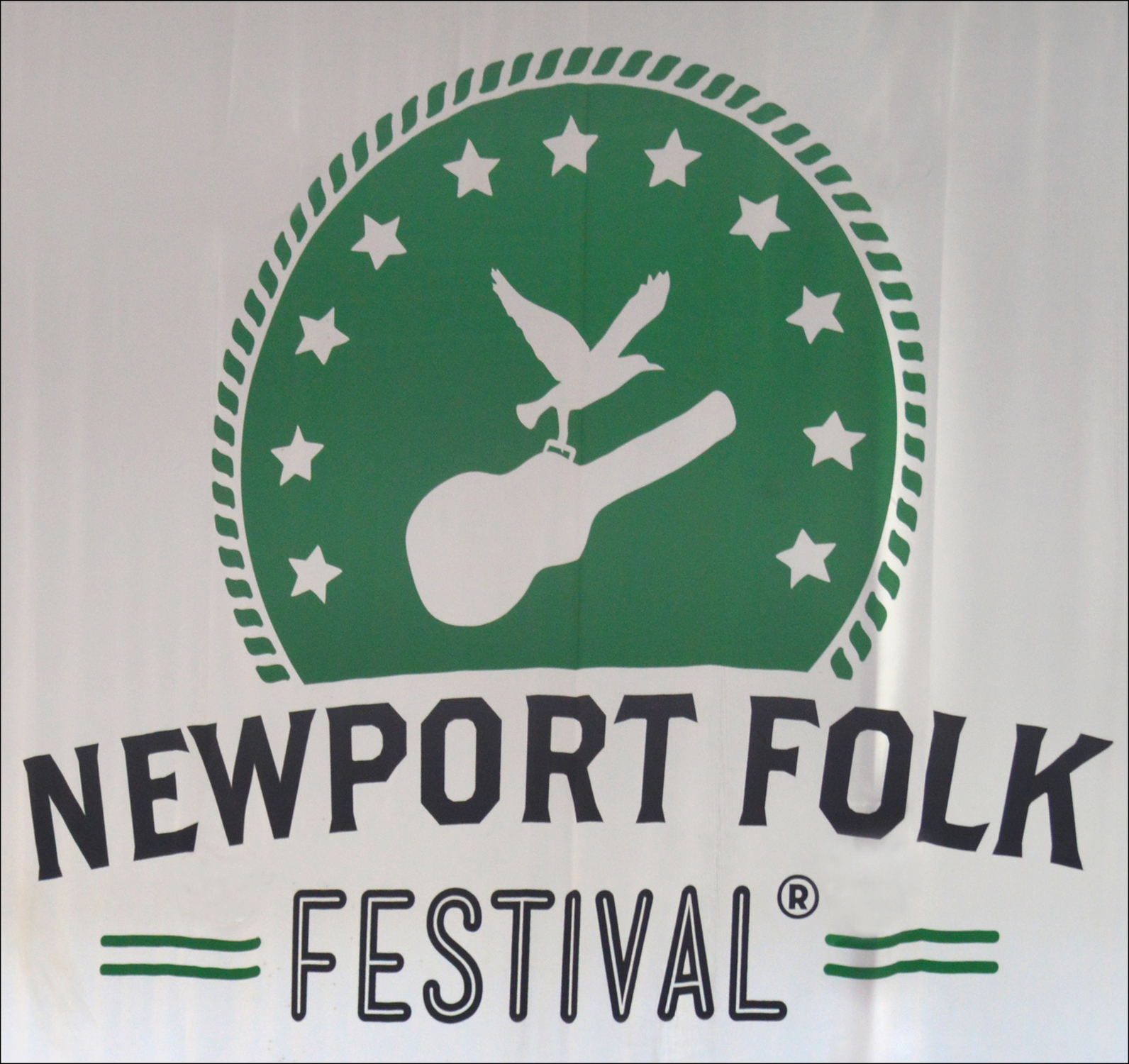
Newport Folk Festival logo

The Newport Folk Festival is an annual American folk-oriented music festival in Newport, Rhode Island, which began in 1959 as a counterpart to the Newport Jazz Festival. The festival was founded by music promoter and Jazz Festival founder George Wein, music manager Albert Grossman, and folk singers Pete Seeger, Theodore Bikel, and Oscar Brand. It was one of the first modern music festivals in America and remains a focal point in folk music. The festival was held in 1959 and 1960, then annually from 1963 to 1969, first at Freebody Park and then at Festival Field. In 1985, Wein revived the festival; it has since been staged annually at Fort Adams State Park.

== History ==
=== Founding ===
The Newport Folk Festival was started in 1959 by George Wein, founder of the well-established Newport Jazz Festival and owner of Storyville, a jazz club in Boston, Massachusetts. In 1958, Wein became aware of the growing Folk Revival movement and began inviting folk artists such as Odetta to perform on Sunday afternoons at Storyville. The afternoon performances consistently sold out and Wein began to consider the possibility of a "folk afternoon embedded within the 1959 Newport Jazz Festival". Wein envisioned the program to be "similar in scope and tone to the highly successful blues and gospel shows" that had taken place at the Jazz Festival in previous years. Wein asked Odetta, Pete Seeger, and the Weavers to perform in the afternoon in addition to the Kingston Trio. Some in the jazz community accused Wein of crass commercialism in booking these groups because they deviated from, and had a larger following than, most jazz musicians of the time. This pressure, coupled with his various conversations with those in the folk community, made it clear to Wein that an afternoon program at the Jazz Festival would not suffice and that there was demand for a full folk festival.

Aware of his own limitations in the folk scene, Wein asked Albert Grossman, then Odetta's manager, to join him in planning and producing the festival. Grossman accepted and began working with Wein to book talent and organize the weekend. Pete Seeger was also involved with the founding of the festival. Theodore Bikel and Oscar Brand were also founders of the festival.

The inaugural festival, held at Freebody Park, included Pete Seeger, Earl Scruggs, the Kingston Trio, John Jacob Niles, Sonny Terry and Brownie McGhee, Odetta, The New Lost City Ramblers, and more. Perhaps the most notable performance was the surprise debut of the eighteen-year-old Joan Baez, who was brought on as a guest of Bob Gibson.

The festival returned in 1960 and was expanded to include three nights. The lineup placed an emphasis on music diversity, booking performers from Africa, Scotland, Spain, Israel, and Ireland alongside "traditional" folk musicians such as Pete Seeger, Ewan McColl, John Lee Hooker, Cisco Houston, and Tommy Makem.

=== A tradition of protest ===
The Newport Folk Festival has a rich connection to protest movements. In the '60s, the festival became a platform for artists who played a substantial part in the civil rights and anti-war movements, including Pete Seeger, Arlo Guthrie, Joan Baez, Tom Paxton, Sweet Honey in the Rock, and the Staple Singers, among many others. In the mid-80s, a new generation of artists—from the Indigo Girls to Tom Morello—also provided keen social commentary from the Newport stage, advocating for women's rights, the LGBTQ community, peace, climate awareness, clean air and water, and the continued call for civil rights activism. In 1988, Ben & Jerry joined forces with Wein's Festival Productions, Inc. to sponsor the event through 1999, a partnership that helped the festival thrive and reinforced its progressive identity.

=== Civil Rights Movement ===
In 1962, two young members of the Student Nonviolent Coordinating Committee (SNCC) formed a gospel vocal quartet named the Freedom Singers. And in 1962, Pete and Toshi Seeger assisted the Freedom Singers in organizing a nationwide collegiate tour. As a result, the civil rights movement became deeply embraced by the folk music community. In 1963, the Freedom Singers performed on the first night of the Newport Folk festival, and on the second night Joan Baez joined SNCC activists and roughly 600 festival-goers on a march through Newport. The crowd walked past the Bellevue Avenue mansions and into Touro Park, where SNCC's executive secretary James Forman and Freedom Singers leader Cordell Reagon delivered speeches, rallying support for the March on Washington scheduled for the following March.

For the final performance on Friday, Wein had scheduled Peter, Paul, and Mary. But under the persuasion of Albert Grossman, who was managing Peter, Paul, and Mary, Wein decided to allow Bob Dylan (whom Grossman was also managing) to close the night. After Peter, Paul, and Mary finished their afternoon set, Wein announced that they would reappear at the end of the evening. Dylan performed a set consisting of particularly topical songs: "With God on Our Side", "Talkin' John Birch Society Blues", and "A Hard Rain's Gonna Fall". Peter, Paul, and Mary then returned and performed an encore of "Blowin' in the Wind". Amidst a "deafening roar of applause" they brought to the stage Dylan, Joan Baez, Pete Seeger, Theo Bikel, and the Freedom Singers. The singers stood in a single line facing the audience with crossed arms and clasped hands and began to sing a variation on the Baptist hymn "I'll Overcome Some Day". The hymn's new incarnation -- "We Shall Overcome" -- had become an anthem for the Civil Rights Movement.

=== Revival of Mississippi John Hurt ===
In 1928, Mississippi John Hurt, a self-taught amateur musician and farmer, recorded 13 songs for Okeh Records which failed to achieve commercial success. Believing his musical career to be over, Hurt continued farming, apparently thinking little of his brief recording gig.

Post WWII, few records cut by southern musicians in the 1920s were commercially available. Hurt's records were particularly rare, since few had been manufactured in the first place. But Harry Smith, a member of a tiny subculture of obsessive, cranky collectors, put two John Hurt cuts on his influential 1952 Anthology of American Folk Music prompting many blues hobbyists to begin searching for him. In 1963, Tom Hoskins and Mike Stewart acquired a tape of Hurt's Avalon Blues through their informal network of tape traders. Hurt had recorded Avalon Blues at the end of a week-long stay in New York that spanned Christmas 1928. Apparently homesick in the big city, Hurt included a line about his home in Avalon being always on his mind.

Hoskins and Stewart were able to locate Avalon and track Hurt down. After asking Hurt to perform, to ensure he was actually who he claimed to be, Hoskins convinced Hurt to move to Washington, D.C., and embark on a national tour.

The tour culminated on Saturday evening of the 1963 Newport Folk Festival, when Mississippi John Hurt performed alongside Brownie McGhee, Sonny Terry, and John Lee Hooker for a blues workshop at the Newport Casino. The performance is considered to be a seminal moment for the folk revival and caused Hurt to rise to fame. He performed extensively at colleges, concert halls, and coffeehouses and appeared on The Tonight Show Starring Johnny Carson, on Pete Seeger's public TV show Rainbow Quest, and had a write up in Time magazine.

=== Electric Dylan controversy ===
Bob Dylan's 1963 and 1964 performances solo and with Baez had made him popular with the Newport crowd, but on July 25, 1965, festival headliner Dylan was booed by some fans when he played with several members of the Paul Butterfield Blues Band as his backing band.

It is usually said that the reason for the hostile reception by a small number of fans was Dylan's "abandoning" of the folk orthodoxy, or poor sound quality on the night (or a combination of the two). The controversy regarding the reaction of the audience at this event is often overplayed, as it was not the general reaction of the audience, but rather that of a small number of folk "purists", including Pete Seeger. The reaction of "the crowd" to Dylan's performance, certainly from eyewitness accounts, was generally quite enthusiastic. This performance, Dylan's first live "plugged-in" set of his professional career, marked the shift in his artistic direction from folk to rock, and had wider implications for both genres. The performance marked the first time Dylan performed "Like a Rolling Stone" in public. Johnny Cash, who was a major influence on Dylan, had played an electric guitar at the 1964 Newport Festival. A letter which Cash wrote to the editor of Broadside which called for the people at the Newport Folk Festival to "shut up and let him sing" shortly before the 1964 festival had a major influence on Dylan's shift in the direction for his musical career as well.

Despite the musical transition, Dylan's growing status within the larger counterculture ensured that his place in the expanding movement would remain secure.

Dylan did not return to Newport until 2002, when he played a headlining performance while wearing a wig and fake beard.

=== Johnny Cash introduces Kris Kristofferson ===
In 1969, the Johnny Cash troupe was to perform on opening night of the festival. Cash had recently become aware of Kris Kristofferson, a young, relatively unknown country singer-songwriter, and convinced George Wein to allow Kristofferson to join him onstage. Kristofferson's performance of "Me and Bobby McGee" and other songs gave him a launch into his musical career. The 1969 festival also included the debut festival performance of James Taylor, who performed "Carolina in My Mind" to a standing ovation during a "young performers" showcase. However, Taylor only performed for 15 minutes before Wein ended the festival early with the announcement that Apollo 11 had landed on the Moon.

=== End of Folk Festival, hiatus, and return ===
The Folk Festival did not return to Newport in 1970, due to financial issues and local controversies involving the Newport Jazz Festival. Following a riot at the jazz festival in 1971, Wein moved his jazz festival to New York, but the folk festival was dormant for over a decade.

In 1981, Wein returned to Newport with his Jazz Festival at a new waterfront site: Fort Adams State Park. Robert L. Jones, Wein's longtime producer, ran the shows. Jones worked for Wein as both a road manager and producer of jazz and blues events. But his life in music began in Boston folk clubs with artists such as Joan Baez, Tom Rush, Eric von Schmidt, and Bob Dylan, and he first came to Wein's attention as a talent scout, traveling across the country with folklorist Ralph Rinzler to bring undiscovered artists of all kinds to the Newport stage. It was Jones' dream to revive the folk event, and in 1985, he persuaded the Weins to bring back the Newport Folk Festival.

=== 1985-2006 ===
With Jones at the helm, Newport Folk programs honored traditional forms of American roots music (blues, bluegrass, Cajun, gospel, and more) alongside a wide range of contemporary songwriters, classic Americana bands such as Little Feat and The Band, world music artists, early jam bands, AAA artists, Irish and British folk-rock, Mardi Gras Indians, and alt-country groups. The festival inaugurated a Friday night concert, established Song Circles with songwriters such as Shawn Colvin, Sarah McLachlan, and Buddy Miller in the round, and expanded to three stages. Other groundbreaking sets included a teenaged Alison Krauss's major festival debut, iconic blues performances from B.B. King, Susan Tedeschi, and Bonnie Raitt, early incarnations of the Indigo Girls, Mary-Chapin Carpenter, and Joan Baez as Four Voices in Harmony, classic performances by Weir & Wasserman, Crosby, Stills & Nash, Joan Armatrading, Elvis Costello, Willie Nelson, and Wilco, and in 2005, an extended collaborative set with Bright Eyes, Jim James, and M. Ward. The festival sold out on only a few occasions in those years, but remained commercially strong enough to continue growing and attract strong audiences for both traditional and contemporary artists.

=== Michelle Shocked and V-J Day protest ===
The Newport Folk Festival has, throughout various points in its history, remained connected to protest movements. In the 1960s, the festival played a substantial part in the civil rights movement. In the early '80s, the Festival was one of the first festivals to serve as a platform for climate change protest.

In the 1990s, playing on Victory Day (originally Victory over Japan Day or V-J Day) folk musician Michelle Shocked asked the entire standing audience to drop to the ground on cue to show what it would look like when crowds died on "Hiroshima Day." This was relevant to the locale of the festival as Rhode Island is the only U.S. state which still officially celebrates the holiday, and the Naval War College is also in Newport, two miles from the Fort Adams State Park where the festival is held.

=== Return of Bob Dylan ===
In 2002, Bob Dylan returned to the Newport Folk Festival for the first time since his iconic performance in 1965, when he went electric. George Wein noted that the anticipation in 2002 was intense. "The question is what will he do at Newport? We have never asked. Whatever it is, it will be all right with me." Rick Massimo, music writer, recalls Dylan took the stage in "a white cowboy hat, a fake beard, and a long, stringy-haired wig" in what seemed a wry acknowledgment of the legions of music journalists and photographers who came to document his return. Backstage guests included Al Gore and Richard Gere, alongside dozens of other musicians who flocked to hear the set. Dylan and his band (including Larry Campbell and Charlie Sexton) launched into "Roving Gambler" then played a series of classics alongside his newer material: a set markedly in keeping with the rest of his tour. Peter Stone Brown wrote, "The guy underneath the hat may have looked a little strange, but in the end it was the music that mattered and just maybe that’s what he’s been trying to say all along."

=== Films and books ===
In 2005, alternative rock band The Pixies came to Newport with an acoustic performance, a concept that referenced Dylan's going electric. The set was recorded and turned into a feature film directed by Michael B Borofsky, titled Pixies: Acoustic: Live in Newport.

In 2013, NAKA producers Alyson Young and Beverly Penninger released The Newport Effect, a documentary exploring the impact of the Newport Folk Festival since its inception in 1959. The film features interviews, performances, and behind-the-scenes footage of the event. Narrated by Joan Armatrading, with segment narrators Rosanne Cash, Michael Doucet, Steve Earle, Angelique Kidjo, Pokey LaFarge, Tom Morello, Mavis Staples, and Lucinda Williams.

In 2003, Da Capo Press published Myself Among Others: A Life in Music, a memoir by George Wein and coauthor Nate Chinen.

In 2017, Wesleyan University Press published I Got A Song, A History of the Newport Folk Festival by Rick Massimo.

=== Establishment of foundation ===
The Newport Folk Festival has existed in various forms since its creation; founded as a not-for-profit, the festival became a for-profit in the mid-1980s. However, in 2011, the festival announced it would return to its non-profit status under the umbrella of the Newport Festivals Foundation. The Foundation not only strived to sustain the Newport Folk and Newport Jazz Festival, but also expand the impact of its Festivals through educational initiatives that celebrate innovation while preserving the deep traditions inherent in jazz and folk music.

=== 50th celebration ===
By 2006, after an autoimmune syndrome left Jones partially paralyzed, he was no longer able to produce the festival. In 2008, Executive Producer George Wein hired Jay Sweet as an associate of the festival. Sweet brought the Black Crowes and Trey Anastasio, frontman of Phish, as headliners and other artists on the bill included Stephen Marley and Damian Marley, sons of reggae icon Bob Marley. The Festival was well attended and received favorable press, despite folk purists questioning the modernization of the festival. In 2009, Wein asked Jones and his team to work with Sweet for the 50th anniversary of the festival, and their collaboration resulted in a multi-generational celebration.

=== New era ===
The success of the 2009 festival marked a new era in the festival's history. Under Sweet's direction, the festival has reclaimed its place at the center of American music, with surprise sets by Dolly Parton and Joni Mitchell among other standout performances. In 2011, the two-day festival sold out Saturday, and in 2012, the festival sold out both days. In 2013, the festival expanded to three days and sold out both Saturday and Sunday. In 2014, the festival sold out all three days, months in advance. As of 2023, the festival has sold out every year since.

=== 65 Revisited ===
In commemoration of the 50th anniversary of Bob Dylan going electric at Newport, the Festival scheduled a program titled 65 Revisited on the final night of the 2015 festival. The program's details and performers were kept secret before the performance - prompting various rumors including the return of Bob Dylan.

Instead, the program featured an array of more contemporary musicians, including Taylor Goldsmith of Dawes, Gillian Welch and David Rawlings, Willie Watson, Hozier and Klara Soderberg of First Aid Kit, John McCauley and Ian O'Neil of Deer Tick, Robyn Hitchcock and the Preservation Hall Jazz Band of New Orleans. The ensemble performed a collection of Dylan's material, ending the performance with "Rainy Day Women No. 12 and 35".

=== COVID-19 pandemic ===
The 2020 edition of the festival was canceled due to the global COVID-19 pandemic. Artists who were scheduled to perform at the festival were invited to return for the 2021 edition.

In March 2021, Rhode Island governor Dan McKee announced that the state was working with the Newport Festivals Foundation to hold the folk and jazz festivals in the summer with modified capacities and a different format. Instead of its typical format, the 2021 Newport Folk Festival was instead formatted as two three-day events in July featuring performances, storytelling, and workshops.

=== 2022: Joni Mitchell surprise appearance ===
The 2022 festival marked a return to normal operations. A highlight was when Brandi Carlile introduced a surprise appearance by Joni Mitchell as the festival's closing act. This was the 78-year-old Mitchell's first full-length public performance since the early 2000s and her first appearance at the festival since 1969.

== Programming style ==
In recent years, the Newport Folk Festival has developed a reputation for selling out of tickets before announcing the lineup. Unlike most festivals, the festival "rolls out" their lineup over the course of the year instead of releasing a lineup poster on one day. The festival has also developed a reputation for programming surprise, unannounced artists. Past instances include the 65 Revisited program (2015), in which Gillian Welch and Dave Rawlings, Dawes, and Willie Watson appeared unannounced. Other surprise moments include My Morning Jacket (2015), James Taylor (2015), Kris Kristofferson (2016), Roger Waters (2017), Mumford & Sons (2018), Dolly Parton (2019), Paul Simon (2022), and Joni Mitchell (2022). Like 65 Revisited in 2015, 2018's A Change Is Gonna Come closing set paired guests from the weekend with unannounced guests including Leon Bridges, Chris Thile, and Mavis Staples.

== Settings ==
From 1959 to 1964, the festival was held at Newport's Freebody Park; 1963 saw Bob Dylan's festival debut at the adjacent Newport Casino, where he performed with Joan Baez in the Casino's Horseshoe Court. 1965 through 1969 the festival took place at Festival Field; this is where Dylan "went electric" in 1965. Festival Field has since been built over with apartments.

Since the festival's revival in 1985, the festival has taken place at Fort Adams State Park. Fort Adams houses five stages, the Fort Stage which sits looking out at Newport harbor and the famous Claiborne Pell Bridge, the Harbor Stage, The Quad Stage, The Bike Stage (powered by people riding stationary bikes) and The Foundation Stage. The festival is known for its beautiful setting- as the music blog Consequence of Sound writes: "Located at the gorgeously scenic Fort Adams, in Newport, Rhode Island, glimmering, clear blue water surrounds the small vivid green peninsula. Look out from the fort towers and you'll see hundreds of beautiful boats rocking along the water." (Consequence of Sound). My Morning Jacket frontman Jim James told Spin: "You've got the sun on your skin and the breeze in your hair. It's magical here... It's just magical." (SPIN at Newport Folk 2010) Brandi Carlile says "It's one of my favorites so far if not my favorite." (Brandi Carlile Interview)

WMVY began streaming the festival in 2005 and was joined by NPR Music in 2008. WMVY's Archives contains both performances and interviews from Newport Folk and NPR music has recorded sets available for listening here: NPR at Newport Folk 2010.

== Sustainability ==
The festival has made efforts in being green-friendly, teaming with many groups to do so. It partnered with Clean Water Action and Rhode Island Resource Recovery to collect 1.5 tons of recyclables. CWA worked onsite picking up trash and recycling, and set up composting stations to curb the waste generated during the event. A portion of beer and wine sales went to CWA to support its work. The official beer of the festival, Vermont-based Magic Hat used plant-based, 100% compostable cups. The festival also partnered with CLIF Bar, who set up a bike valet to encourage people to cycle to the event and participate in its two-mile challenge. It worked with New England Wind Fund to offset power used during the festival, and Klean Kanteen to provide reusable water bottles. It also partnered with Farm Fresh Rhode Island to incorporate local foods into the vendors' fare.

== Awards ==
- In 2015, the Newport Folk Festival was named Music Festival of the Year by Consequence of Sound.
- In 2012, the Newport Folk Festival was named Music Festival of Year by Pollstar.
- In 2014, the Newport Folk Festival was named Music Festival of Year by Pollstar.
- In 2015, the Newport Folk Festival was named Music Festival of Year by Pollstar.

== Albums recorded at the festival ==
- John Lee Hooker - The Folk Lore of John Lee Hooker (1961; includes material from the 1960 festival)
- John Lee Hooker - Concert at Newport (1964; recorded at the 1963 festival)
- Doc Watson and Family - Treasures Untold (1964, recorded at the 1964 festival)
- Doc Watson - Songs for Little Pickers (1991; includes material from the 1988 festival)
- The Kingston Trio - The Kingston Trio Live at Newport (1994; recorded at the 1959 festival)
- Joan Baez - Live at Newport (1996; recorded at the 1963, 1964, and 1965 festivals)
- Phil Ochs - Live at Newport (1996; recorded at the 1963, 1964, and 1966 festivals)
- Lightnin' Hopkins - Live at Newport (2002; recorded at the 1965 festival)
- Bob Dylan - The Bootleg Series Vol. 7: No Direction Home: The Soundtrack (2005, includes material from the 1964 and 1965 festivals)
- Bob Dylan - The 50th Anniversary Collection 1964 (2014; includes material from the 1964 festival)
- Joni Mitchell - Joni Mitchell at Newport (2023; recorded at the 2022 festival)

== See also ==
- American folk music revival
- Festival!, 1967 film
- No Direction Home, 2005 Martin Scorsese documentary on Bob Dylan
- A Complete Unknown, 2024 film
- Kerrville Folk Festival
- Philadelphia Folk Festival
- Newport Music Festival
