= Steven Heller (composer) =

Steven Heller is a producer-composer, based in Asheville, North Carolina, who has won two Grammy Awards, as well as a number of national awards for his music and recordings. He was production music supervisor for the 1995 Miramax film, "The Journey of August King. He wrote and produced the theme music for "Conversations" and "Evening Rounds," listener call-in programs on the public radio station WCQS, in Asheville, North Carolina. Steven Heller is the father of guitarist Drew Heller of the band Toubab Krewe.

== Grammy awards ==
- 1996 - 39th Annual Grammy Awards (February 26, 1997) - Best Spoken Word Album for Children: David Holt, narrator; David Holt, Steven Heller & Virginia Callaway, producers; for Stellaluna
- 2002 - 45th Annual Grammy Awards (February 23, 2003) - Best Traditional Folk Album: David Holt & Doc Watson, artists; Steven Heller, engineer/mixer; Steven Heller, producer; for Legacy
