= William Mooney (actor) =

American television and theatre actor

William Mooney is an American television and theatre actor. Mooney played the character Paul Martin in the daytime soap opera All My Children. He has been nominated for two Daytime Emmy Awards, including a 1980 nomination for Outstanding Lead Actor in a Drama Series.

Mooney is also a storyteller. He was nominated for two Grammy Awards for albums with David Holt.

== Filmography ==
- Second Sight (1989) – Fritz Bloom
- C.A.T. Squad: Python Wolf (1988) (TV) – aka Python Wolf
- Beer (1985) – Newscaster
- A Flash of Green (1984) – Leroy Shanner
- The Next Man (1976) – Press Room Reporter
- All My Children (1970) TV Series – Paul Martin #2 (1972–1982, 1984–1985, 1995)
- "The Mayor of Sherwood" (1987 TV Mini Series) – Mayor Rob Sachs

== Television ==
- As the World Turns playing "Judge Jessup" 20 January 1999

== Awards ==
Daytime Emmy

1980: Nominated for Outstanding Actor in a Daytime Drama Series for All My Children (1970).

Grammy

1996: Nominated for Best Spoken Word Album for Children for Why the Dog Chases the Cat: Great Animal Stories (with David Holt).

1998: Nominated for Best Spoken Word Album for Spiders in the Hairdo: Modern Urban Legends (with David Holt).
