= Bill Harley =

American storyteller

- Born: William Harley; July 1, 1954 (age 72); Greenville, Ohio, U.S.
- Education: Hamilton College
- Occupations: Musician, Storyteller, Author
- Years active: 1975–present
- Website: www.billharley.com

Bill Harley (born William Harley, July 1, 1954 in Greenville, Ohio) is an American children's entertainer, musician, and author who has been called "the Mark Twain of contemporary children's music" by Entertainment Weekly. He uses a range of musical styles, and his audience includes both children and adults. Harley began singing and storytelling in 1975 while still a student at Hamilton College. Much of his material is autobiographical, focusing on vignettes from childhood.

== Career ==
Harley has released over 30 recordings. He received two Grammy Awards for Best Spoken Word Album For Children (albums consisting of predominantly spoken word versus music or song) for his albums Blah Blah Blah: Stories About Clams, Swamp Monsters, Pirates & Dogs and Yes to Running! Bill Harley Live in 2007 and 2009, and five additional Grammy nominations. He has also won Parents' Choice awards, ALA (American Library Association) awards and the highest award from the Oppenheim Toy Portfolio for his concert DVD Yes to Running.

Harley has also published numerous books. His first novel for elementary students, The Amazing Flight of Darius Frobisher, was chosen by Bank Street School of Education as one of the best children's books of the year. His second novel for children, Night of the Spadefoot Toads, was released in October 2008 and won a Green Earth Book Award. His picture books include Sitting Down To Eat, which was selected as an American Booksellers Association Pick of the List. A book from his most recent series, Charlie Bumpers vs. The Teacher of the Year, won the 2016 Beverly Cleary Children's Choice award and is part of the One School One Book programming from Read to Them.

Harley has performed in more than 2500 schools over the years. In addition to children's music, he performs at storytelling festivals around the country, including appearances at the National Storytelling Festival. He tours nationwide as an author, performing artist and keynote speaker from his home in Seekonk, Massachusetts. His 1988 album You're in Trouble had a contributing bit by Rhode Island children's performer Salty Brine, who started one of Harley's songs like a weather report, and his trademark line "No school Foster-Glocester!"

== Awards ==
=== Nominations ===
- 1999 Grammy Award Best Spoken Word Album For Children; Weezie And The Moon Pies
- 2000 Grammy Award Best Spoken Word Album for Children; The Battle of the Mad Scientists and Other Tales of Survival
- 2008 Grammy Award Best Musical Album for Children; I Wanna Play
- 2010 Grammy Award Best Spoken Word Album For Children; The Best Candy In The Whole World
- 2012 Grammy Award Best Album For Children; High Dive and other things that could have happened…

=== Awards ===
- 2001 National Storytelling Network's Circle of Excellence Award
- 2006 Storytelling World Award; Joey, Chloe and the Swamp Monsters
- 2007 Grammy Award Best Spoken Word Album For Children – Blah Blah Blah: Stories About Clams, Swamp Monsters, Pirates & Dogs
- 2009 Grammy Award Best Spoken Word Album For Children – Yes to Running!
- 2009 Green Earth Book Award Children's Fiction – Night of the Spadefoot Toads
- 2010 Rhode Island Humanities Council Lifetime Achievement Award

== Discography ==
- 1984: Monsters in the Bathroom
- 1986: 50 Ways to Fool Your Mother
- 1987: Dinosaurs Never Say Please
- 1987: Cool In School: Tales from the 6th Grade
- 1987: Coyote
- 1988: You're in Trouble
- 1989: In the Hospital (With Peter Alsop)
- 1990: Grownups Are Strange
- 1990: Come On Out and Play
- 1990: I'm Gonna Let It Shine
- 1994: Already Someplace Warm
- 1995: Wacka Wacka Woo
- 1995: From the Back of the Bus
- 1995: Sitting On My Hands
- 1996: Lunchroom Tales: A Natural History of the Cafetorium
- 1996: Big Big World
- 1996: Who Made This Mess? (Video/DVD)
- 1997: There's A Pea On My Plate
- 1998: Weezie and the Moonpies
- 1999: The Battle of the Mad Scientists and Other Tales Of Survival
- 1999: Play It Again
- 2001: Down in the Backpack
- 2002: Sandburg Out Loud (with Carol Birch, Angela Lloyd & David Holt)
- 2002: Mistakes Were Made
- 2003: The Town Around the Bend
- 2004: cELLAbration! A Tribute to Ella Jenkins (with various artists, from Smithsonian Folkways)
- 2004: The Teachers' Lounge
- 2005: One More Time
- 2005: Blah Blah Blah
- 2007: I Wanna Play
- 2008: Yes to Running! Bill Harley Live Double CD
- 2008: Yes to Running! Bill Harley Live DVD
- 2009: First Bird Call
- 2009: "Wash Your Hands (Lavate las Manos)" (single)
- 2010: Rock & Roll Playground (with various artists, from Putumayo)
- 2010: The Best Candy in the Whole World
- 2010: "Grimsley's Christmas Surprise" (single)
- 2012: High Dive
- 2012: "Puddy Wiot" (single)
- 2013: It's Not Fair to Me (with Keith Munslow)
- 2014: Nothing For Granted
- 2017: "Hold Your Candle" (single)
- 2017: "Well...I'm Sorry" (single)
- 2018: Further Around the Bend: More News from the Town Around the Bend
- 2018: John Muir's Stickeen
- 2018: Same Moon: Bill Harley Live at Home
- 2019: "The Emporer's New Clothes Talking Blues" (single)
- 2020: Just Kidding (compilation)
- 2020: Storytime (compilation)
- 2020: Bill & Keith's Dollar Store, Vol. 1 (with Keith Munslow)
- 2020: "Walking Each Other Home" (single)
- 2020: "Elijah" (single) (with Peter Amidon)
- 2020: "I Know an Old Lady (Who Swallowed a Fly)" (single)
- 2020: "Little Things" (single)
- 2020: "Same Rain (We Sing for Peace)" (single)
- 2020: "Three Gilly Boats" (single)
- 2022: Walking Each Other Home
- 2022: No Problem: Stories of Accidental Mayhem
- 2022: "Best. Song. Ever." (single) (with Keith Munslow)
- 2024: “The Bogman” (single)
- 2024: “Jericho Road” (single)

== Bibliography ==
- 1989: Peter Alsop & Bill Harley: In the Hospital
- 1994: Carna and the Boots of Seven Strides
- 1995: Open Ears
- 1995: Nothing Happened
- 1996: Sarah's Story
- 1996: Sitting Down to Eat (illustrated by Kitty Harvill)
- 2001: Bear's All Night Party
- 2005: Dear Santa
- 2006: Do It Together: A Collection of Favorite Songs
- 2006: The Amazing Flight of Darius Frobisher
- 2008: Dirty Joe the Pirate (illustrated by Jack Davis)
- 2008: Night of the Spadefoot Toads
- 2010: Between Home and School
- 2012: Lost and Found (illustrated by Adam Gustavson)
- 2013: Charlie Bumpers vs. the Teacher of the Year
- 2014: Charlie Bumpers vs. the Really Nice Gnome
- 2014: Charlie Bumpers vs. the Squeaking Skull
- 2015: Charlie Bumpers vs. the Perfect Little Turkey
- 2016: Charlie Bumpers vs. the Puny Pirates
- 2017: Charlie Bumpers vs. His Big Blabby Mouth
- 2019: Charlie Bumpers vs. the End of the Year
- 2021: Now You Say Yes
- Neal Walters & Brian Mansfield (ed.) (1998) MusicHound Folk: The Essential Album Guide, p. 345-347, ISBN 1-57859-037-X (the source of his birth date and place).
