= David Rapkin =

David Rapkin is a recording engineer, sound designer and audio producer, based in New York.

== Career ==
Rapkin has designed sound on Broadway for Steaming by Nell Dunn, On Golden Pond by Ernest Thompson, The Curse Of An Aching Heart by William Alfred, The Wake Of Jamie Foster by Beth Henley and Off-Broadway for Playwrights Horizons and The Phoenix Theater.

Rapkin appeared in, produced, and edited many of Joe Frank's radio programs.

== Awards ==
Radio programs produced by Rapkin have received the Armstrong Award, The Corporation For Public Broadcasting Award and the Ohio State Award for Excellence in local broadcasting, as well as the Gold Medal from The International Radio Festival of New York. Rapkin was twice awarded a Grammy for his work as producer and director of the Harry Potter audiobook series.
