= Jamaican E.T. =

2002 reggae/dub album by Lee "Scratch" Perry

Studio album by Lee "Scratch" Perry
- Released: February 5, 2002
- Recorded: Ro-Lo, Coventry, England
- Genre: Reggae, dub
- Length: 1:13:20
- Label: Sanctuary/Trojan
- Producer: Lee "Scratch" Perry

Lee "Scratch" Perry chronology
Songs to Bring Back the Ark (2000)	Jamaican E.T. (2002)	Earthman Skanking (2003)

Professional ratings
Review scores
Source	Rating
AllMusic	4/5 stars
Blender	4/5 stars

Jamaican E.T. is a reggae/dub album released by Lee "Scratch" Perry. The album was released February 5, 2002, on the Sanctuary/Trojan label, and won the 2003 Grammy Award for Best Reggae Album.

== Track listing ==
All tracks by Lee "Scratch" Perry

1. "10 Commandments" – 4:31
2. "I'll Take You There" – 5:17
3. "Message From The Black Ark Studios" – 4:19
4. "Holyness, Righteousness, Light" – 4:22
5. "Babylon Fall" – 5:45
6. "Mr. Dino Koosh Rock" – 6:00
7. "Hip Hop Reggae" – 4:59
8. "Evil Brain Rejector" – 4:27
9. "Jah Rastafari, Jungle Safari" – 4:49
10. "Love Sunshine, Blue Sky" – 5:45
11. "Clear The Way" – 4:30
12. "Congratulations" – 4:22
13. "Shocks Of Mighty" – 4:27
14. "Jamaican E.T." – 5:44
15. "Telepathic Jah A Rize" – 4:07

== Personnel ==
Credits on Jamaican E.T. include:

- Lee "Scratch" Perry - vocals, producer
- Al Fletcher - drums
- Nick Welsh - bass
- Chris Clunn - photography
- Justin Dodsworth - keyboards
- Leigh Malin - sax (tenor)
- Tim Debney - mastering
- Michelle Naylor - backing vocals
- Sharron Naylor - backing vocals
- Anthony Harty - guitar, electric percussion
- Roger Lomas - engineer, mixing
