= Kent Gustavson =

- Education: Stony Brook University, Middlebury College
- Occupations: Author; musician; professor

Kent Gustavson is an author, musician, and professor. Gustavson is most well known for his biography on musician Doc Watson called Blind But Now I See.

== Personal life and education ==
Gustavson started performing music from an early age, first taking classical piano lessons, then learning to play the double bass. For college, he attended Middlebury College in Vermont, then achieved his doctorate degree in classical composition at Stony Brook University on Long Island. He also spent time in Jerusalem learning the Arabic lute and playing with a Palestinian music ensemble.

Gustavson currently lives in Tulsa, Oklahoma, where he works as a freelance author and music journalist.

== Career ==
=== Author ===
While in college, Gustavson became interested in the music of Doc Watson, a well-known folk singer-songwriter and guitarist. This interest ultimately culminated in the first extensive biography of Doc Watson, titled Blind But Now I See. The book features interviews with a multitude of friends and musicians familiar with Watson, including Ben Harper, Béla Fleck, members of the Seeger family, and many others. The book was well received by critics, who particularly praised the extensive research and detail put into the book. The book won the 2011 Next Generation Indie Book Award for best biography and was a finalist in the 2010 book of the year awards presented by ForeWord Magazine.

After the death of Doc Watson in May 2012, Gustavson was invited onto Public Radio Tulsa, a National Public Radio network station, to discuss his legacy.

=== Professor ===
Gustavson previously served as a professor at Stony Brook University, where he taught courses in subjects including writing, music, and the German language. He also hosts workshops internationally.

=== Performer ===
Gustavson has recorded more than a dozen albums. His 2004 album Stolen Shack was featured on NPR's All Songs Considered program. Host Robin Hilton praised the album, stating that "the CD has songs from the Civil War and from Cyndi Lauper, from Ireland and Asbury Park, and somehow it all works."

Gustavson's recording of the hymn "And Am I Born To Die" which was featured on that record was nominated for a Just Plain Folks award.

== Influences ==
Gustavson cites musician and record producer Michael Chorney and guitarist Doc Watson as important influences to his musical performance and career interests.
