= B.J. Goss =

American songwriter

Benjamin Goss is an American recording engineer, producer, and songwriter, who currently resides in Franklin, Tennessee, with his wife Julie, and their three children, Samantha, Joseph, and Alexandria.

Goss is a two-time Grammy Award winner, and three-time nominee. His other accomplishments include two Telly Awards for music composition and production for video, and six Dove awards for his engineering work in gospel music. As a songwriter and publisher, he has had over 80 songs recorded in the church market.

Goss is also a licensed attorney in the state of Tennessee.

Goss is the son of gospel music producer, Lari Goss.
