= Doc Watson =

American musician (1923–2012)

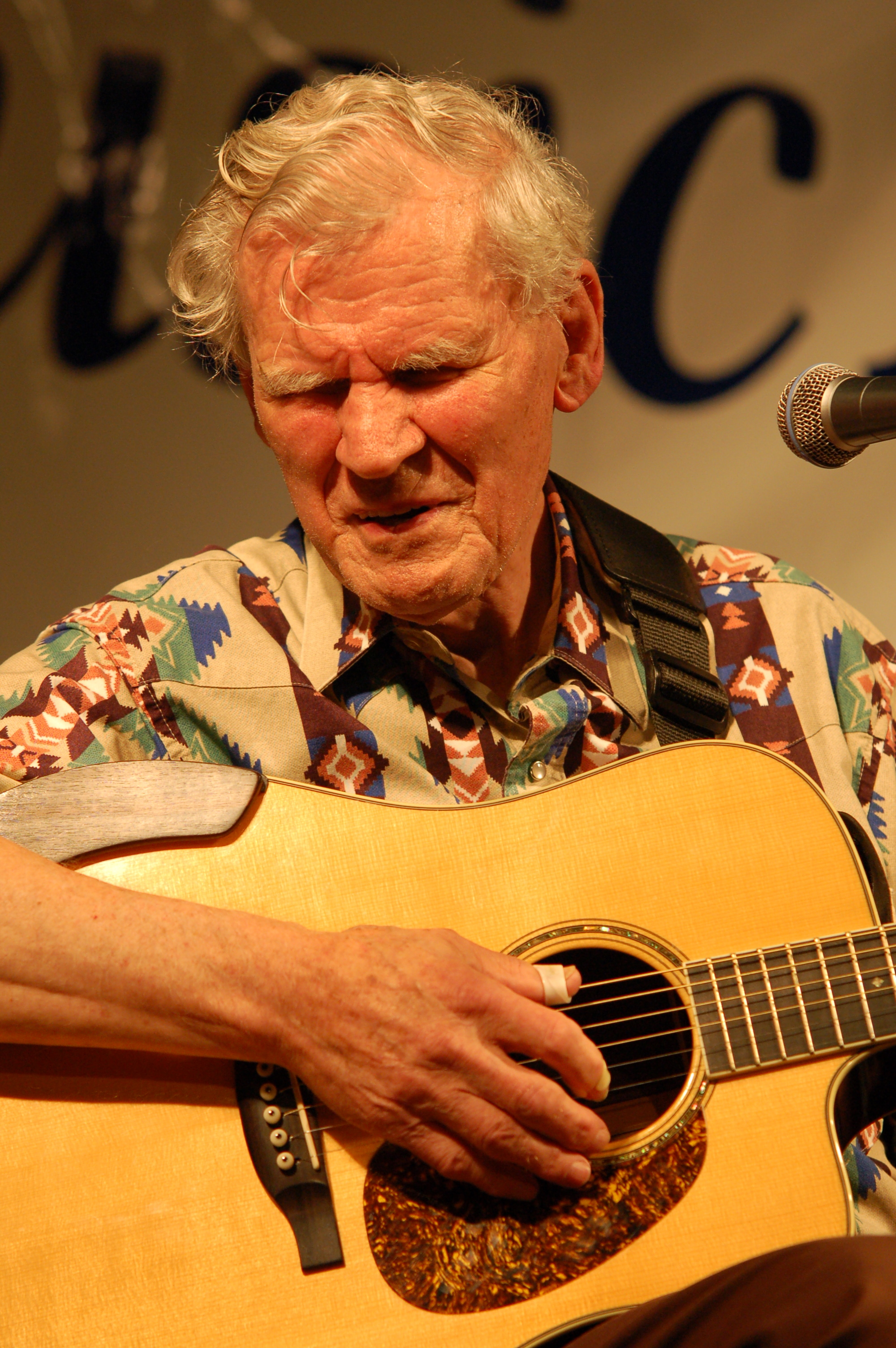
- Watson at MusicFest 'N Sugar Grove, Sugar Grove, North Carolina, 2009

Background information
- Also known as: Doc Watson
- Born: Arthel Lane Watson; March 3, 1923; Deep Gap, North Carolina, U.S.
- Died: May 29, 2012 (aged 89) Winston-Salem, North Carolina, U.S.
- Genres: Bluegrass; folk; old-time; country; blues; gospel
- Occupations: Musician, singer-songwriter
- Instruments: Vocals, guitar, banjo, harmonica
- Years active: 1953–2012
- Labels: Folkways, Vanguard, United Artists, Flying Fish, Sugar Hill
- Spouse: Rosa Lee Carlton Watson

Arthel Lane "Doc" Watson (March 3, 1923 – May 29, 2012) was an American guitarist, songwriter, and singer of bluegrass, folk, country, blues, and gospel music. He won seven Grammy awards as well as a Grammy Lifetime Achievement Award. His fingerpicking and flatpicking skills, as well as his knowledge of traditional American music, were highly regarded. Blind from a young age, he performed publicly both in a dance band and solo, as well as for over 15 years with his son, guitarist Merle Watson, until Merle's death in 1985 in an accident on the family farm.

== Early life ==
Watson was born in Deep Gap, North Carolina. According to Watson on his three-CD biographical recording Legacy, he got the nickname "Doc" during a live radio broadcast when the announcer remarked that his given name Arthel was odd and he needed an easy nickname. A fan in the crowd shouted "Call him Doc!", presumably in reference to the literary character Sherlock Holmes's companion, Doctor Watson. The name stuck.

An eye infection caused Watson to lose his vision before his second birthday. He attended North Carolina's school for the blind, the Governor Morehead School, in Raleigh, North Carolina.

In a 1989 radio interview with Terry Gross on the Fresh Air show on National Public Radio, Watson spoke about how he got his first guitar. His father told him if he and his brother David chopped down all the small dead chestnut trees along the edge of their field, they could sell the wood to a tannery. Watson bought a Sears Silvertone from Sears Roebuck with his earnings, while his brother bought a new suit. Later in the same interview, Watson mentioned that his first high-quality guitar was a Martin D-18.

Watson's earliest influences were country roots musicians and groups such as the Carter Family and Jimmie Rodgers. The first song he learned to play on the guitar was "When Roses Bloom in Dixieland", first recorded by the Carter Family in 1930. Watson said in an interview with American Songwriter that "Jimmie Rodgers was the first man that I started to claim as my favorite." Watson proved to be a natural musical talent and within months was performing on local street corners playing songs from the Delmore Brothers, Louvin Brothers, and Monroe Brothers alongside his brother Linny. By the time Watson reached adulthood, he had become a proficient acoustic and electric guitar player.

== Career ==
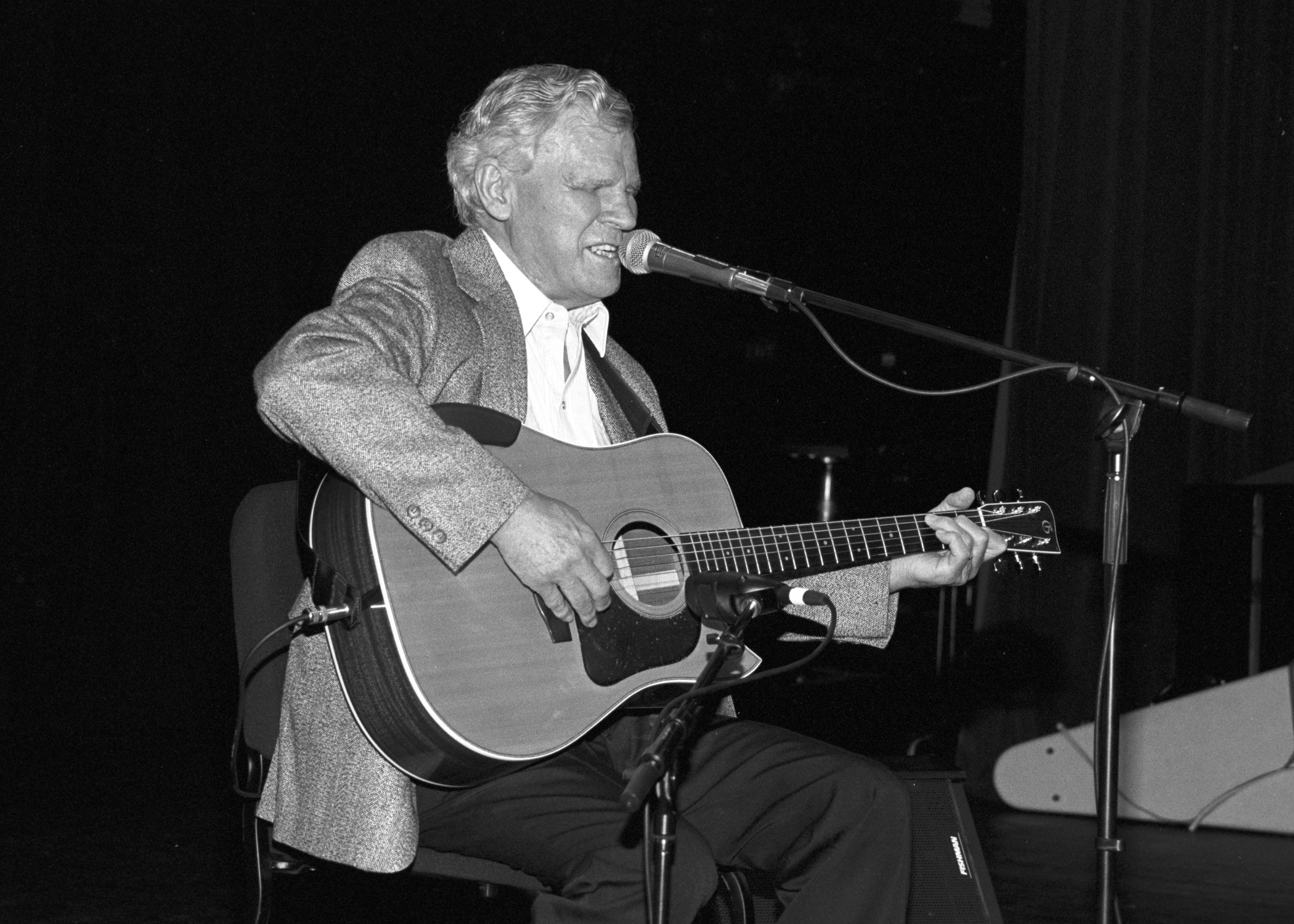
Watson performing in 1994

In 1953, Watson joined the Johnson City, Tennessee–based Jack Williams's country and western swing band on electric guitar. The band seldom had a fiddle player, but was often asked to play at square dances. Following the example of country guitarists Grady Martin and Hank Garland, Watson taught himself to play fiddle tunes on his Gibson Les Paul electric guitar. He later transferred the technique to acoustic guitar, and playing fiddle tunes became part of his signature sound. During his time with Jack Williams, Watson also supported his family as a piano tuner.

In 1960, as the American folk music revival grew, Watson took the advice of folk musicologist and Smithsonian curator Ralph Rinzler and began playing acoustic guitar and banjo exclusively. That move ignited Watson's career when he played on his first recording, Old Time Music at Clarence Ashley's also featuring fellow Ashley-band members Clint Howard and Fred Price. Also of pivotal importance for his career was his February 11, 1961, appearance at P.S. 41 in Greenwich Village. He then began to tour as a solo performer and appeared at universities and clubs like the Ash Grove in Los Angeles. Watson eventually got his big break and rave reviews for his performance at the Newport Folk Festival in Newport, Rhode Island in 1963. Watson recorded his first solo album in 1964 and began performing with his son Merle in the same year.

After the folk revival waned during the late 1960s, Doc Watson's career was sustained by his performance of the Jimmy Driftwood song "Tennessee Stud" on the 1972 live album recording Will the Circle Be Unbroken. As popular as ever, Doc and Merle began playing as a trio with T. Michael Coleman on bass guitar in 1974. The trio toured the globe during the late seventies and early eighties, recording eleven albums between 1973 and 1985, and bringing Doc and Merle's unique blend of acoustic music to millions of new fans. In 1985, Merle died in a tractor accident on his family farm. Two years later Merle Fest was inaugurated in remembrance of him.

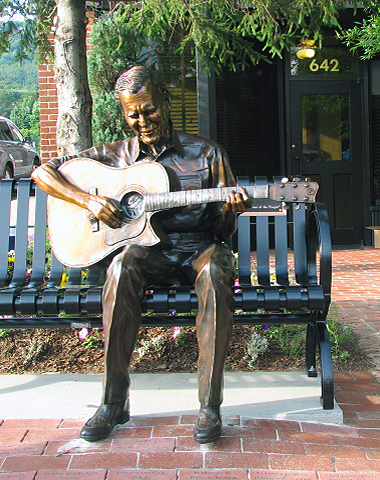
Watson sculpture on the corner of King and Depot Streets in Boone, North Carolina. The plaque on the bench reads "Just one of the People".

Arlen Roth writes, "...we can attribute an entirely new style and a whole generation of pickers to [Watson's] inspiration. He was the first rural acoustic player to truly 'amaze' urban audiences in the early 1960s with his dazzling, fast technique, and he has continued to be a driving, creative force on the acoustic music scene."

Doc Watson played guitar in both flatpicking and fingerpicking style, but is best known for his flatpick work. His guitar playing skills, combined with his authenticity as a mountain musician, made him a highly influential figure during the folk music revival. He pioneered a fast and flashy bluegrass lead guitar style including fiddle tunes and crosspicking techniques which were adopted and extended by Clarence White, Tony Rice and many others. Watson was also an accomplished banjo player and sometimes accompanied himself on harmonica as well. Known also for his distinctive and rich baritone voice, Watson over the years developed a vast repertoire of mountain ballads, which he learned via the oral tradition of his home area in Deep Gap, North Carolina.

Watson played a Martin model D-18 guitar on his earliest recordings. In 1968, Watson began a relationship with Gallagher Guitars when he started playing their G-50 model. His first Gallagher, which Watson referred to as "Ol' Hoss", was on display at the Country Music Hall of Fame in Nashville before residing at the Gallagher shop until 2012, when it was auctioned through Christie's on November 27, 2012. In 1974, Gallagher created a customized G-50 line to meet Watson's preferred specifications, which bears the Doc Watson name. In 1991, Gallagher customized a personal cutaway guitar for Watson that he played until his death and which he referred to as "Donald" in honor of Gallagher guitar's second-generation proprietor and builder, Don Gallagher. During his last years, Watson played a Dana Bourgeois dreadnought given to him by Ricky Skaggs for his 80th birthday. Another of Watson's favorites was his Arnold guitar, "The Jimmie", built by luthier John Arnold as a tribute to the famous 1926 Martin 00-18 played by Jimmie Rodgers.

In 1994, Watson teamed with musicians Randy Scruggs and Earl Scruggs to contribute the classic song "Keep on the Sunny Side" to the AIDS benefit album Red Hot + Country produced by the Red Hot Organization.

== Later life ==
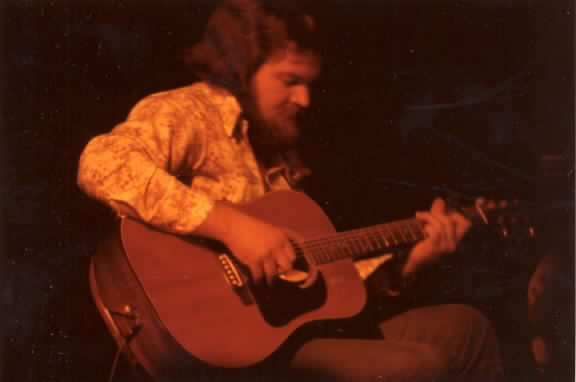
Merle Watson, c. 1979

In his later life, Watson scaled back his touring schedule. He was generally joined onstage by his grandson (Merle's son) Richard, as well as longtime musical partners David Holt or Jack Lawrence. On June 19, 2007, Watson was accompanied by Australian guitar player Tommy Emmanuel at a concert at the Bass Performance Hall in Fort Worth, Texas. Watson also performed, accompanied by Holt and Richard, at the Hardly Strictly Bluegrass festival in San Francisco in 2009, as he had done for several previous festivals.

Watson hosted the annual MerleFest music festival held every April at Wilkes Community College in Wilkesboro, North Carolina. The festival features a vast array of acoustic style music focusing on the folk, bluegrass, blues and old-time music genres. It was named in honor of Merle Watson and is one of the most popular acoustic music festivals in the world, drawing over 70,000 music fans each year. The festival has continued after his death.

Watson was inducted into the North Carolina Music Hall of Fame in 2010.

== Personal life ==
In 1947, Watson married Rosa Lee Carlton, the daughter of popular fiddle player Gaither Carlton. The couple had two children, Eddy Merle (named after country music legends Eddy Arnold and Merle Travis) in 1949 and Nancy Ellen in 1951.

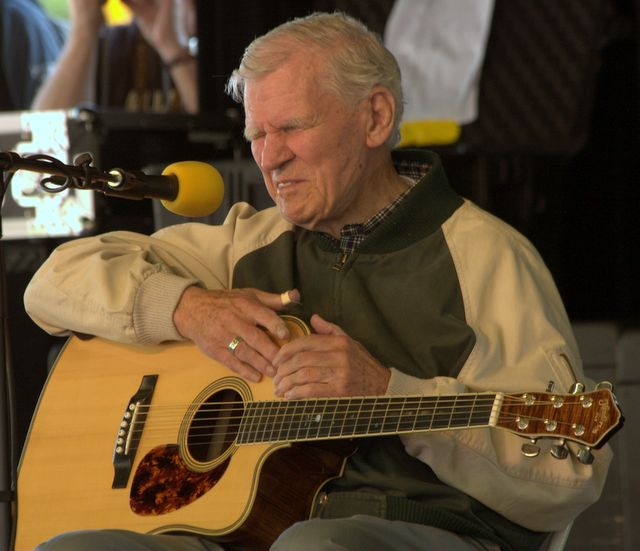
Watson's last performance, 2012

On April 29, 2012, Watson performed with the Nashville Bluegrass Band on the Creekside Stage at MerleFest. It was an annual tradition for Watson to join the Nashville Bluegrass Band for a gospel set on the festival's Sunday morning. It would be his final performance.

On May 21, 2012, Watson fell at his home. He was not seriously injured in the fall, but an underlying medical condition prompted surgery on his colon. Watson died on May 29, 2012, at Wake Forest Baptist Medical Center of complications following the surgery at the age of 89. He is buried in the Merle and Doc Watson Memorial Cemetery, Deep Gap with his wife and son.

== Legacy ==
In 2002, High Windy Audio released a multi-CD biographical album of Watson's work, titled Legacy. The collection features audio interviews with Watson interspersed with music, as well as a complete recording of a live performance at the Diana Wortham Theatre in Asheville, North Carolina. The collection won the 2002 Grammy Award for Best Traditional Folk Album.

In 2010, Blooming Twig Books published a comprehensive biography of Watson, written by Kent Gustavson. The book, titled Blind But Now I See: The Biography of Music Legend Doc Watson, features never before published content regarding Watson's life and career, gleaned from interviews with Watson's friends and collaborators including Norman Blake, Sam Bush, members of the Seeger family, Michelle Shocked, and many others. The book also covers the life, supporting role, and untimely death of Merle Watson. An updated edition was released by Sumach-Red Books in March 2012.

In April 2013, Open Records released a multi-disc collection of unreleased recordings by Watson. The collection, titled Milestones, features 94 songs as well as stories, remembrances, and over 500 photographs. The collection was created by Watson's daughter, Nancy, and is being produced by ETSU Bluegrass and ETSU professor Roy Andrade.

The popularity of the flat picking style of guitar playing has been partially credited to Doc Watson, and bluegrass bands have incorporated it widely, including artists such as Billy Strings.

== Awards and honors ==
In 1986, Watson received the North Carolina Award and in 1994 he received a North Carolina Folk Heritage Award. He is a recipient of a 1988 National Heritage Fellowship awarded by the National Endowment for the Arts, which is the United States government's highest honor in the folk and traditional arts. In 2000, Watson was inducted into the International Bluegrass Music Hall of Honor in Owensboro, Kentucky. In 1997, Watson received the National Medal of Arts from U.S. President Bill Clinton. In 2010, he was awarded an honorary doctor of music degree from Berklee College of Music in Boston, Massachusetts.

There is a sign on U.S. Route 421 near Deep Gap (Watson's birthplace) with the inscription, "Doc and Merle Watson Highway", where that part of the highway is named for both Doc Watson and his son.

=== Grammy Awards ===
- 1973 Best Ethnic or Traditional Recording (Including Traditional Blues): Doc Watson for Then and Now
- 1974 Best Ethnic or Traditional Recording: Merle Watson and Doc Watson for Two Days in November
- 1979 Best Country Instrumental Performance: Doc Watson and Merle Watson for "Big Sandy/Leather Britches"
- 1986 Best Traditional Folk Recording: Doc Watson for Riding the Midnight Train
- 1990 Best Traditional Folk Recording: Doc Watson for On Praying Ground
- 2002 Best Traditional Folk Album: Doc Watson and David Holt for Legacy
- 2004 Lifetime Achievement Award
- 2006 Best Country Instrumental Performance: Bryan Sutton and Doc Watson for "Whiskey Before Breakfast" track from Not Too Far from the Tree by Bryan Sutton
