= David Holt (musician) =

American musician (born 1946)

- David Holt.jpg

David Holt (born October 15, 1946, in Gatesville, Texas) is a musician who performs traditional American music and stories. A four-time Grammy Award winner, Holt plays 10 acoustic instruments and has released recordings of traditional mountain music and southern folktales, hosted Riverwalk, a jazz program on public radio, Folkways, a television program on folk music and culture, Great Scenic Railway Journeys, and North Carolina Mountain Treasures on North Carolina public television.

He is the host of David Holt's State of Music, a public-TV series distributed nationwide by PBS. The program is produced and directed by Will and Deni McIntyre and was nominated for a Midsouth Regional Emmy in 2015.

Holt performed with Doc Watson from 1998 to 2012. He performs wearing his trademark fedora, preferring vintage examples from the 1930s and 1940s.

Holt and his wife, Ginny, have a son, Zeb, who worked for NBC in New York City. Their daughter, Sarah Jane, died in 1989 at age 10 following a car crash.

== Discography ==
Year	Title	Label	Awards	Notes
1981	It Just Suits Me	June Appal		w/ Bob Jordan, Mike Hunter, and Buddy Davis
1981	The Hairy Man And Other Tales	High Windy Audio		
1986	Reel & Rock	High Windy Audio	NAIRD Folk Record of the Year	w/ Doc and Merle Watson
1991	Grandfather's Greatest Hits	High Windy Audio	Grammy nominee	
1994	I Got a Bullfrog: Folksongs for the Fun of It	High Windy Audio	Grammy nominee	
1994	Why the Dog Chases the Cat	High Windy Audio	Grammy nominee	w/ Bill Mooney
1996	Folk Rhythms (DVD)	Homespun		
2000	Stellaluna	High Windy Audio	Grammy award	
2002	Spiders in the Hairdo	High Windy Audio	Grammy nominee	w/ Bill Mooney
2002	Legacy - Doc Watson and David Holt	High Windy Audio	Grammy award	
2003	Live and Kickin' at the National Storytelling Festival	High Windy Audio	Grammy nominee	w/ Zeb Holt
2003	Blue Ridge Parkway (DVD)	UNC-TV		
2004	Great Scenic Railway Journeys - The West (DVD)	Wide Eye Productions	Emmy award	
2004	Clawhammer Banjo 1 (DVD)	Homespun		
2004	Clawhammer Banjo 2 (DVD)	Homespun		
2005	Let It Slide	High Windy Audio		
2006	Hairyman Meets Tailybone	High Windy Audio		
2006	Mostly Ghostly Stories	High Windy Audio		
2006	David Holt & The Lightning Bolts	High Windy Audio		
2009	Cutting Loose	High Windy Audio	Grammy nominee	w/ Josh Goforth
2012	Great Scenic Railway Journeys - Trains Around North America (DVD)	Wide Eye Productions	Emmy award	
2013	Clawhammer Banjo - The Basics and Beyond (DVD)	Homespun		
2014	Ready For The Times	High Windy Audio		as Sutton, Holt and Coleman
2015	David Holt's State of Music	High Windy Audio		
2016	Good Medicine	High Windy Audio		w/ Josh Goforth
