= 1950s in Western fashion =

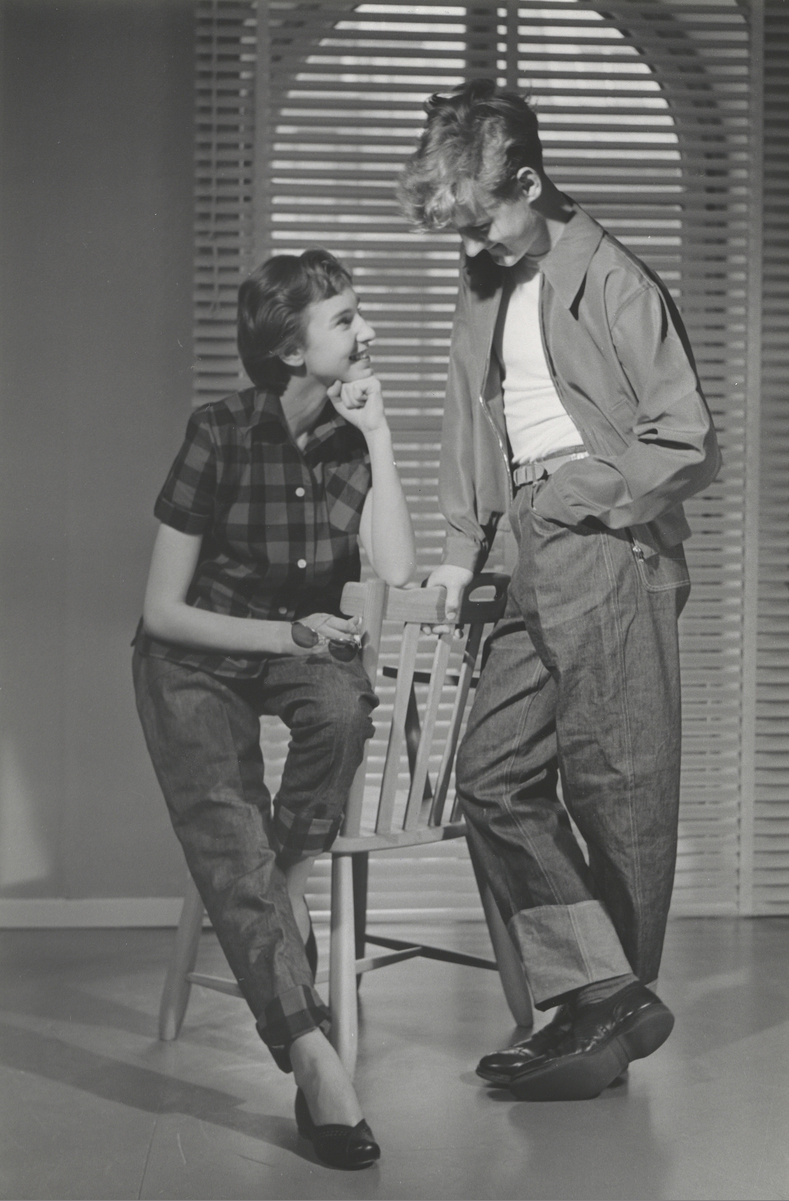
Teenage fashion shoot in 1953. A girl in a checkered shirt and jeans sits beside a boy wearing a poplin jacket, white T-shirt, and jeans. The 1950s saw the emergence of the teenager as a distinct social category with its own preferences and purchasing power.

Western fashion in the 1950s was defined by a tension between tradition and transformation. In women's fashion, the hourglass silhouette introduced by Christian Dior's New Look in 1947 dominated the early years of the decade, imposing unprecedented standards of elegance and formality across all social classes, while the latter half saw a gradual loosening of those prescriptions as designers began exploring simpler, less structured alternatives. In men's fashion, the decade witnessed a sharpening divide between established traditions of elegant suiting and the emergence of entirely new modes of dress driven by working-class youth, rock and roll musicians, and Hollywood rebels. The decade has been described as one of "fashion conformity," in which France regained its supremacy as the arbiter of women's dress while the United States, dominant in popular culture, gave rise to a set of countercultural style statements that would shape the fashion of the decades to come.

Although Paris remained an important center of fashion, several designers contributed to the couture industry's postwar recovery. Christian Dior, Jacques Fath, and Pierre Balmain were described as the "elegant triumvirate", while Cristóbal Balenciaga, Hubert de Givenchy, and Coco Chanel developed alternative approaches to women's fashion., while designers including Cristóbal Balenciaga, Hubert de Givenchy, and Coco Chanel offered alternative designs to the prevailing silhouette. At the same time, Italy emerged as an important new fashion center, especially for sportswear, accessories, and men's tailoring. Fashion historian Daniel Milford-Cottam noted a aspect of the decade: "Two ladies could walk down the street in different outfits, yet appear equally modish, be their skirts full and narrow, or one in a form-fitting sheath and the other in a loose sack dress."

The decade was marked by rapid technological change in the textile industry, as a succession of new synthetic fibers—including acrylics (1950), polyesters (1953), triacetate (1954), and spandex (1959)—transformed both the production and care of clothing, while permanently stiffened nylon petticoats contributed significantly to the popularity of the full skirts of the period. The rise of television as a mass medium created new channels for the spread of fashion information, while the emergence of the teenager as a distinct social category—with its own purchasing power and cultural preferences—would prove to have lasting consequences for the fashion industry. Among the female fashion icons of the era were Grace Kelly, Audrey Hepburn, Marilyn Monroe, Brigitte Bardot, and the newly crowned Queen Elizabeth II, while the male icons—Marlon Brando, James Dean, and Elvis Presley—represented a radical departure from previous ideals of masculine elegance.

== Women's fashion ==
=== The New Look and its legacy ===
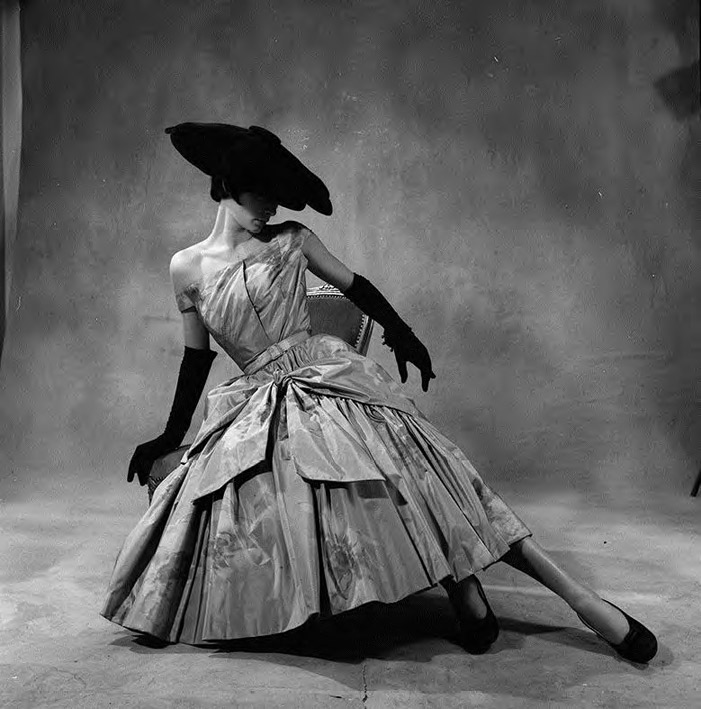
Argentine fashion photograph from 1955, featuring a New Look-inspired dress with a brimmed "saucer hat".

The New Look silhouette—with its rounded, sloped shoulders, nipped-in waist, padded hips, and very full or very narrow skirts—had already been established before the decade began, but it was in the 1950s that its influence permeated women's dress at every social level and price point. John Peacock described the decade's arc as moving "from the comparatively early days of the 'New Look,' when the square shoulders and masculine details of the 1940s still lingered, through the ultra-feminine and luxurious styles of the mid-1950s—clothes with gently softened shoulderlines, tiny corseted waists, roundly padded hips and long, swirling skirts only eleven inches above the ground." Two silhouettes coexisted for most of the decade: one featured a full skirt created by gores or gathers with a fitted bodice, while the other combined the same fitted bodice with a narrow "pencil" skirt that molded closely to the hips. Fashion historian Gerda Buxbaum observed that the long years of wartime deprivation "brought forth a yearning for luxury and fashionable things, and women made a special effort to dress appropriately for every occasion; it was considered imperative that one's accessories matched perfectly."

The idea of strict stylistic conformity gradually gave way to a greater range of options as the decade progressed. Dior himself continued to evolve his designs, introducing a series of new lines: the H line of 1954 was straight and slender with little shaping—nicknamed "the French Bean" by the press; the A line of spring 1955 featured a wide full skirt with an elevated waist; and the Y line of fall 1955 was distinguished by a wide bateau neckline and a narrow silhouette through the body. Other designers challenged the New Look's hourglass imperative: the straight-cut suit introduced around the same time by Chanel, Dior, and Balenciaga emphasized a woman's natural shape with the jacket hanging at the widest point of the hips, while Balenciaga's chemise and high-waisted designs introduced in 1957 represented a decisive move toward what would become the dominant silhouette of the next decade.

=== Daywear ===
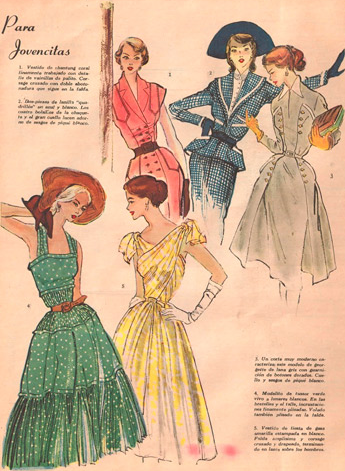
A fashion plate for young women's fashion published in Argentina, 1951.

The well-dressed 1950s woman was expected to be impeccably turned out for every occasion and time of day—an imperative reinforced ceaselessly by fashion magazines that offered systematic "blueprints" for each season, with charts detailing wardrobe pieces, accessories, fabrics, and even makeup colors. As Harper's Bazaar stated in 1953, "It's a matter of immaculacy—of being well-turned-out, from smoothly shaped head to admirably shod toe."

Tailored suits were the commonly worn as daywear, worn for lunch, shopping, and afternoon social engagements. At the designer level they were fabricated in wool fabrics—or linen for summer—with gloves usually worn to the elbow, as bracelet-length sleeves were specifically designed to allow a woman to allowed jewelry to remain visible. Necklines were often cut large enough to display pearl or jeweled necklaces; details such as collars and cuffs, self-covered buttons, crocheted buttons, and topstitching featured details such as. One-piece dresses followed the same two silhouettes in a variety of fabrics: silks, crepes, organzas, and taffetas for more formal occasions; a range of cottons—piqué, dotted Swiss, dobby, and novelty weaves—for more casual use. The shirtwaist dress, always completed with a self belt, was commonly worn; Peter Pan collars were an especially popular detail. Twin sets—matching cardigans and pullovers—were particularly common for fall and spring, while bolero-like cardigans known as shrugs, and evening sweaters with beaded or sequin decorations, provided additional clothing options for formal occasions.

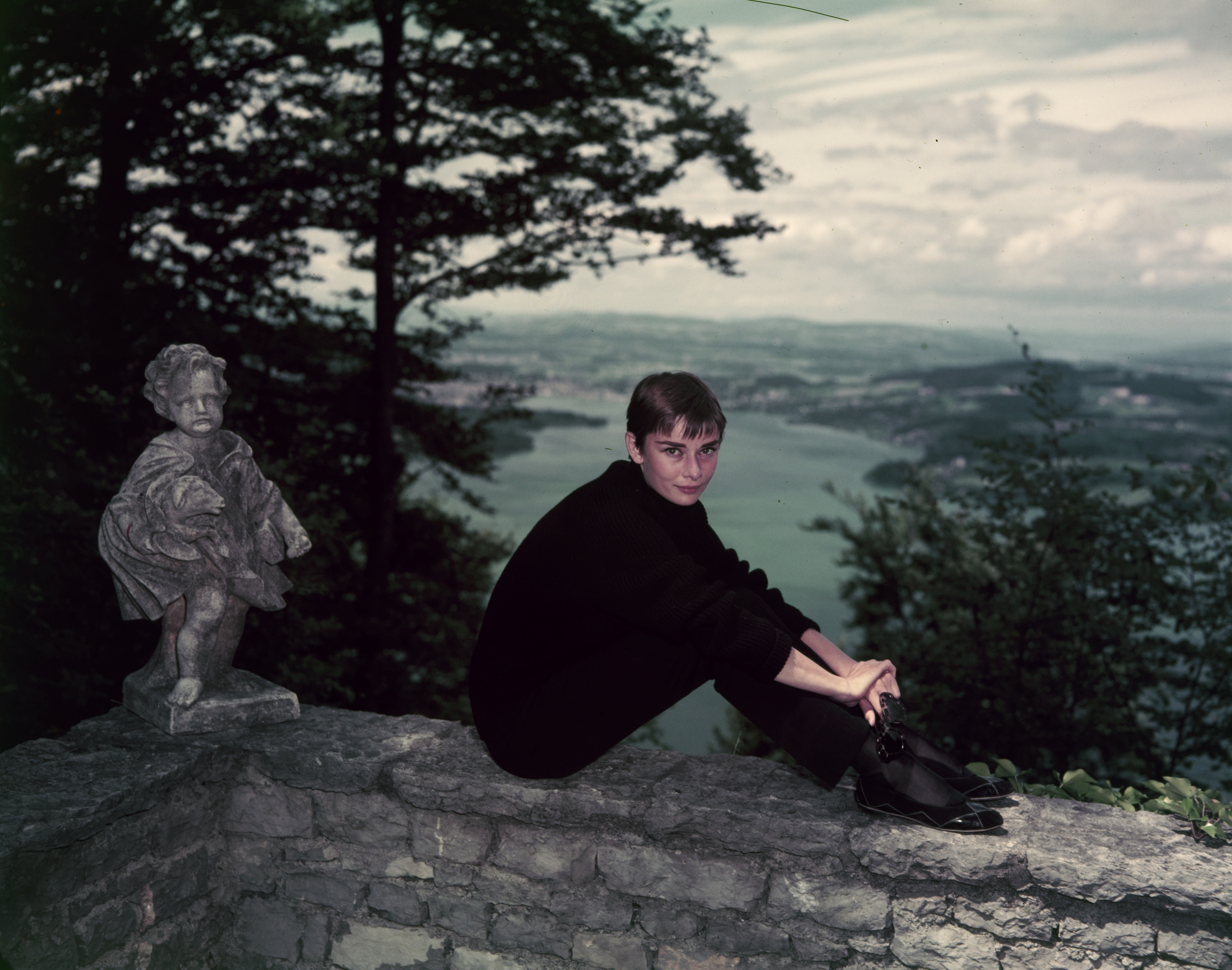
Audrey Hepburn in trousers, c. 1956.

Pants became increasingly accepted for leisurewear. Fitted "toreador" pants, calf-length "Capri" pants, and knee-length "Bermuda" shorts all reflected the influence of international travel on fashion. Shorter pants were given seasonal fashion names: "pedal pushers" for mid-calf styles, "houseboy pants" for calf-length versions. Oregon's Pendleton Woolen Mills released its first women's garment in 1949, the "49er"—a plaid overshirt with patch pockets inspired by their decades-old men's outdoor shirts—which became a perennial favorite as recreational camping grew in popularity; the garment even appeared on I Love Lucy during a camping episode.

Fabric prints expressed the decade's characteristic playfulness. Novelty conversational prints abounded: food was one popular theme, with Givenchy in 1953 showing summer dresses in prints of grapes, oysters, and red and yellow peppers, and Adele Simpson designing silk printed with shrimp the following year. Poodles—with their suggestion of Parisian panache—were especially popular; travel prints featured London landmarks, Chinese pagodas, and Tahitian palms; scientific discoveries inspired prints featuring molecular forms and crystalline structures; and abstract expressionism, particularly the work of Jackson Pollock, influenced both fashion fabrics and interior textiles. Contemporary art also informed fabric commissions: a 1955 Life magazine photo spread featured Claire McCardell's designs in fabrics created by Chagall, Dufy, Miró, Léger, and Picasso.

=== Eveningwear and cocktail dresses ===
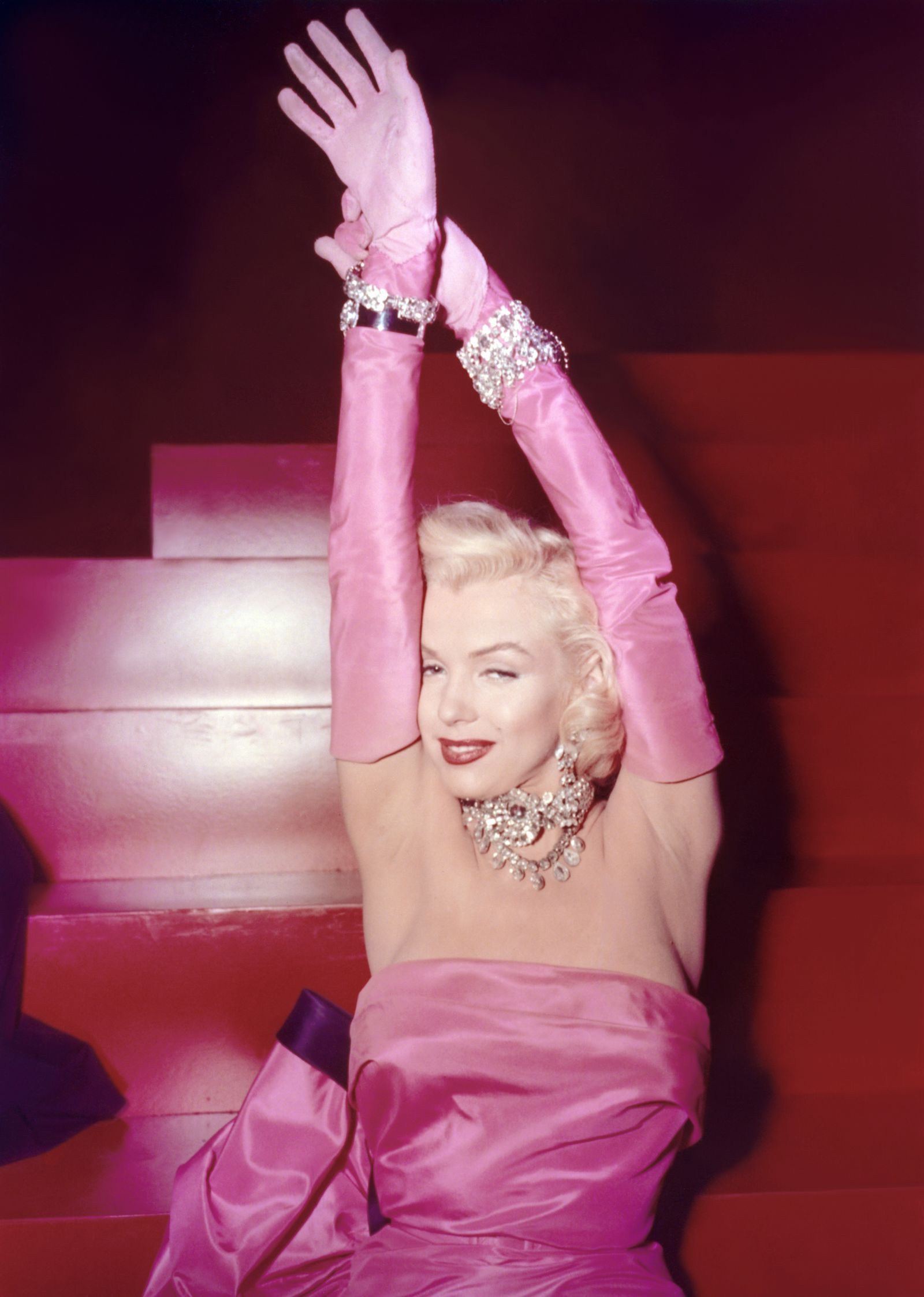
Marilyn Monroe, 1953.

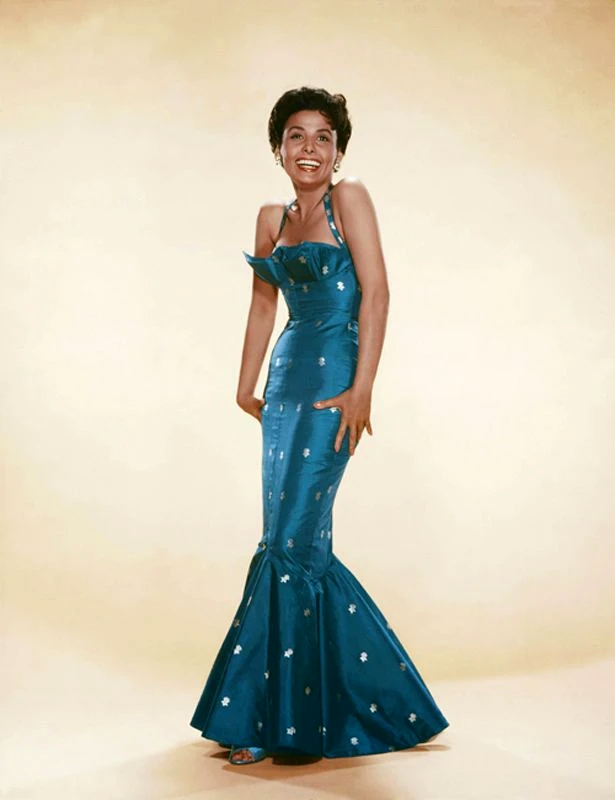
Lena Horne in Meet Me in Las Vegas (1956), wearing a dress designed by Helen Rose.

Evening clothes celebrated luxury and glorified the lush materials of the time. Large volumes of fabric were used to create the fuller silhouette, with long dramatic gowns evoking the 19th century through silk brocade, warp-printed taffeta, ciselé velvet, and elaborate embroidery and beading. "Ballerina" or "waltz" length—falling at the ankle—was common for the shorter version of the evening gown, especially popular with high school and college students worn over stiff crinolines. Strapless bodices predominated in eveningwear—typically worn by married women, while young unmarried women favored designs with straps or capped sleeves.

As the social ritual of the cocktail party took on greater importance in the decade's domestic and social life, the cocktail dress became a significant and distinct category of the wardrobe—one that Christian Dior is credited with having named. Worn at gatherings typically held between six and eight in the evening, these mid-calf-length dresses were fabricated in luxurious materials—velvets, brocades, often beaded—and accessorized with eye-catching jewelry and a veiled cocktail hat. Some cocktail dresses were teamed with matching boleros or coordinating coats; dinner clothes also included fancy dinner suits in silk ottoman, matelassé, and cloqué, often trimmed with fur collars and cuffs. Hostess ensembles—sometimes combining slim pants with a divided full skirt open at the front, worn with a decorative apron—were another important part of the market.

Wedding dresses were usually long and romantic, in satin, tulle, and lace, sometimes supported with hoop skirts. As early as 1950, shorter bridal gowns began to appear, with Balmain showing a "day-length dress with a floor-length train," and Audrey Hepburn's memorable Givenchy short wedding dress in Funny Face (1957) continued this trend. The most influential real-life bridal gown of the decade was that worn by Grace Kelly for her 1956 marriage to Prince Rainier III of Monaco—designed by Helen Rose as a gift from MGM studio—which was among the decade's most copied dresses; Kelly's beige organza bridesmaids' dresses were also widely reproduced.

=== Outerwear ===
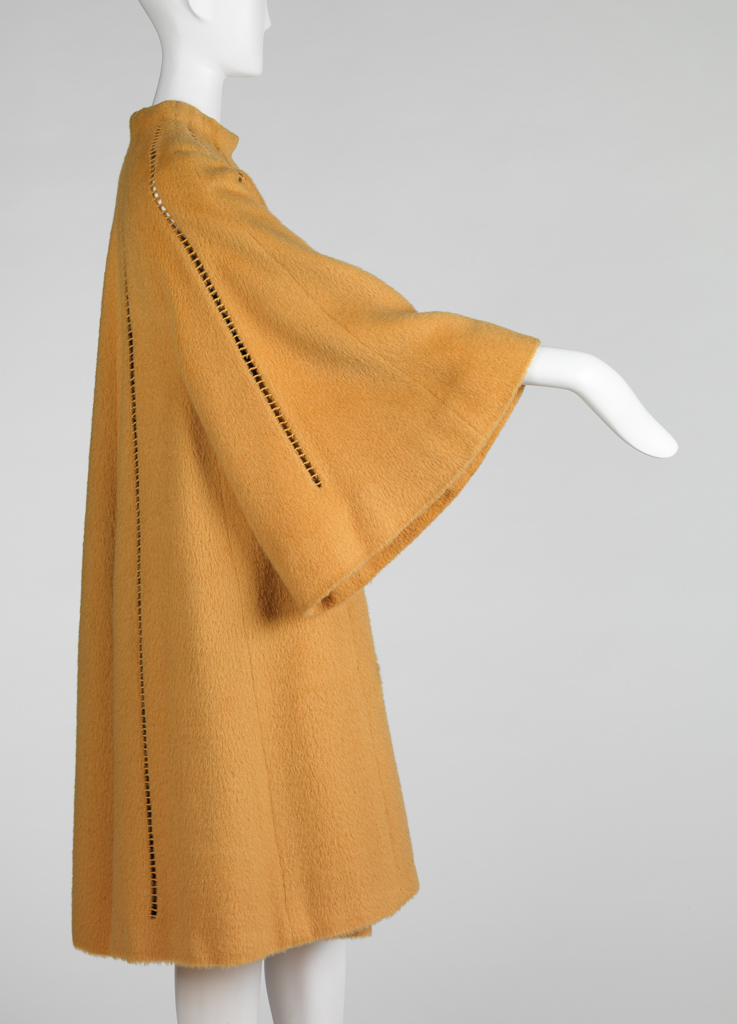
A felted wool and mohair blend coat by Pierre Balmain, 1950s.

Not since the early 20th century had coats been as important to women's wardrobes as they were in the postwar years. Fitted versions were cut in the princess line and belted; others flared full from the shoulders, often with kimono or raglan sleeves. It was vital that the outer garment was just long enough to cover the hem of the dress or suit worn beneath it. Well-dressed women owned many coats in a variety of weights and colors; these were sometimes matched to the dress or suit worn underneath, repeating a fabric from one piece to another. Three-quarter-length "car coats" reflected the lifestyle of many suburban women for whom the automobile had become central. Evening coats were fabricated in satin, taffeta, moiré faille, and shantung; designers also revived the redingote of the 18th and 19th centuries—formfitting with a nipped-in waist and a long flared skirt—updated for the times.

Fur was a dominant feature of the era's outerwear: mink had become the ultimate status symbol, while sable and fox were also prized. Short fur jackets with three-quarter-length sleeves were very popular; fur capelets and stoles were favored for evening, especially at the cocktail hour. Curly pelts such as astrakhan or Persian lamb appeared frequently in jackets, coats, and hats, and as trim on wool garments; leopard and zebra skins were especially favored for both coats and trimmings. The military trench coat was widely adopted for civilian wear, with Hollywood stars including Marlene Dietrich, Lauren Bacall, Ingrid Bergman, Ava Gardner, and Katharine Hepburn all famously wearing trenches in films of the period.

=== Sportswear and leisurewear ===
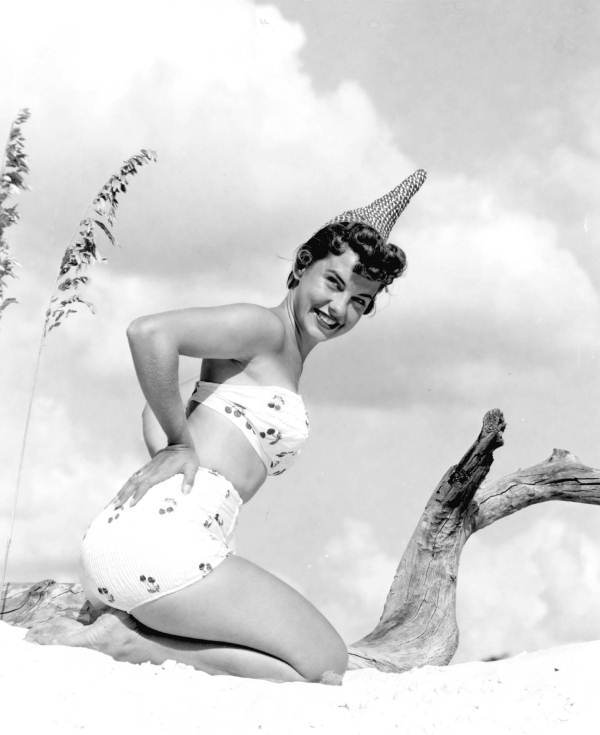
A fashion shoot for two-piece swimsuits in Florida, c. 1955.

After wearing trousers out of necessity during the wartime years, post-war women embraced casual wear that offered slimmer, more feminine designs in new stretch fabrics. Clam diggers, capris, stirrup pants, jodhpurs, and culottes gradually replaced the more mannish slacks of the 1940s. In the 1950s more people than ever before were involved in sports activities—whether tennis and bowling, baseball and skiing, or golf—and even those not actively participating wanted to look as though they were aspiring to a wholesome, active image. When Katharine Hepburn starred in Pat and Mike (1952) as a champion athlete, she created a sensation with her athletic figure and sporty wardrobe.

Swimwear was sometimes boned, cupped, and shaped in both one- and two-piece versions. Notable designers contributed to this category—Dior designed for Cole of California and Givenchy for Jantzen—while textile innovations were rapidly applied to swimwear construction. Brigitte Bardot helped popularize the bikini when she posed in one at the Cannes Film Festival in 1953; nonetheless, American women largely continued to wear more modest styles, while bikinis saw only slow increases in acceptance. Gottex, renowned for colorful patterned swimwear, was founded in Israel by Lea Gottlieb, a Hungarian emigré, in 1956.

Skiwear became lighter as new synthetic fibers were developed; stirrup pants and down jackets crossed over from the ski slopes into everyday life. Tennis clothes remained standardized in white: crisp belted tunics or short skirts with a fitted cropped cardigan created a feminine impression on the court. The equestrian look—with its lean lines and aristocratic associations—was widely admired and imitated; Grace Kelly's avid horsemanship helped set the trend. Bowling had become fashionable and was heavily marketed to women; Capezio launched a range of bowling shoes featuring high-society ladies in their advertising campaign.

=== Foundations and lingerie ===
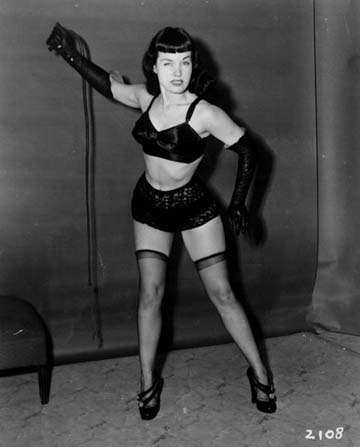
Bettie Page posing in lingerie in a 1950s pin-up photo.

The fashionable silhouette of the decade demanded highly structured foundations: pointy breasts, a cinched waist, and prominent hips were the goal, achieved through a comprehensive array of undergarments. Bras featured circular stitching on cups to emphasize a pointed shape; some incorporated wires for support; strapless and convertible styles accommodated the decade's deep necklines. Balconnet bras, with shelf-like half cups and wide-set straps, created a high bustline especially suited to low-cut evening styles. Long-line versions known as "merry widows" extended from the bust to the waist and were boned with synthetic materials. Girdles and corselets combined bra and girdle in all-in-one garments; waist cinchers were sold under the evocative names guêpière, "waspie," and "waistliner." Full stiffened petticoats—preferably of lightweight, permanently stiffened nylon net rather than starched crinoline, which required far more maintenance—were essential for holding out the full skirts of the period.

Maidenform's "I Dreamed..." advertising campaign reached new heights of fantasy in the 1950s; the Canadian Wonderbra was also aggressively marketed. Foundations were marketed to juniors as well, with teenage models used in advertisements that presented them as essential to proper dressing. The versatile stretch fiber Lycra was introduced in 1959, signaling a new direction in foundation technology. Lingerie favored nylon and lace; nightgowns were often filmy and lace-trimmed; full-length peignoir sets were popular, as were pajamas for both sleep and loungewear.

=== Accessories ===
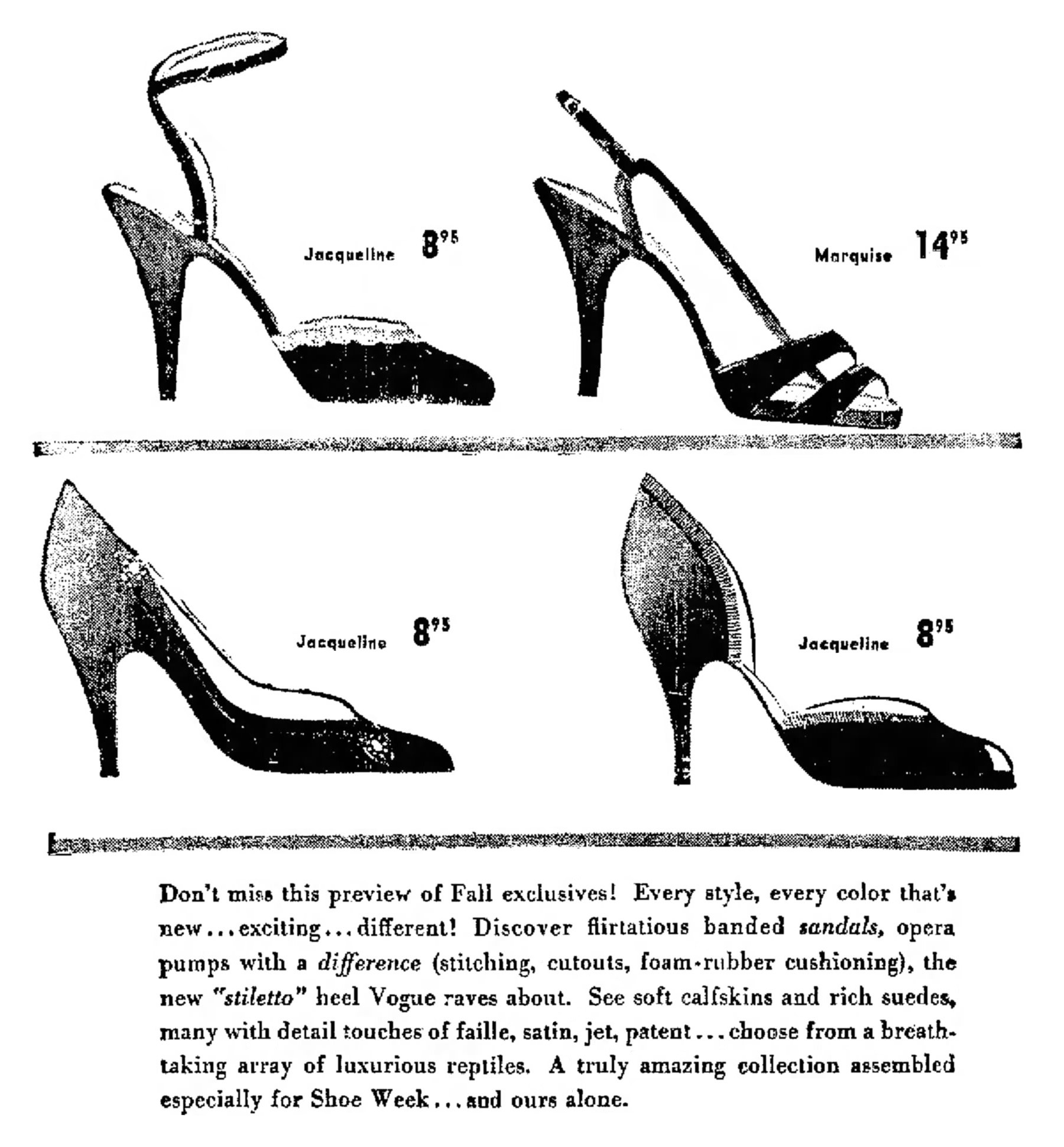
An American newspaper ad for stiletto heels, 1952.

Accessories were an important item for a well dressed 1950s woman. The mark of a well-dressed woman was her hat: small, shaped styles fitted tightly to the head—pillbox, cloche, and beret variations—alongside wide-brimmed picture hats and fantastical cocktail confections decorated with large flowers, arrangements of pointy feathers, and bows. Veils were frequently worn over the face, in fine net or thicker mesh. Prominent Parisian milliners included Paulette, Claude Saint-Cyr, and Rose Valois; in London, Aage Thaarup and Rudolf earned acclaim for their designs for Queen Elizabeth; and American hat designers Lilly Daché and John-Frederics continued their long-standing success.

Handbags were structured and boxy, carried in the hand or in the crook of the arm so as not to interfere with the line of a dress or suit. Leather and suede were popular for cooler months; summer bags in straw, raffia, or fabric were offered in a wide range of colors to coordinate with clothing. One Hermès style, the Sac à dépêches, became famous through its association with Grace Kelly: photographed in 1956 carrying the bag, Kelly—by then Princess Grace of Monaco—made the style so indelibly her own that it became universally known as the "Kelly bag."

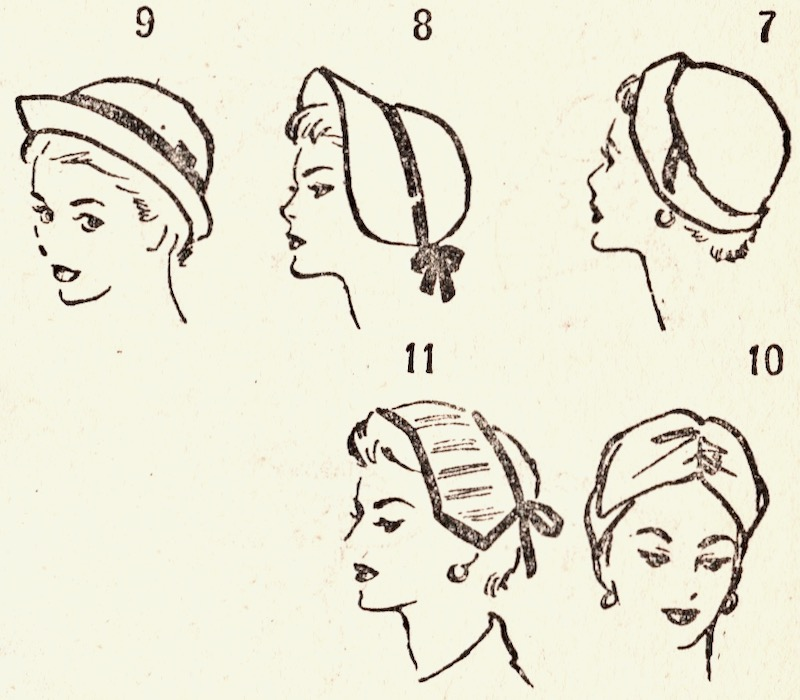
A Japanese magazine ad for hats, 1955.

Beginning around 1954, Roger Vivier designed shoes with "stiletto heels"—very thin heels reinforced with metal rods—that fundamentally altered the shoe silhouette. Toes grew progressively more pointed through the decade, vamps lowered, and heels became thinner; by the mid-1950s the stiletto heel incorporated a steel spike up the center to prevent the narrow heel from breaking under pressure. Other popular styles included strappy sandals for evening, ballerina flats, and loafers and sneakers for sport and leisure. Prestigious shoe labels including Perugia, Ferragamo, Roger Vivier, and Delman created ornate shoes in luxurious silks with lavish embellishment; evening shoes were frequently made of dress fabric to create a perfectly matched ensemble.

Gloves were worn with most daytime outfits year-round, in seasonal materials ranging from suede and leather to summer crochet and novelty prints. Printed silk scarves in all shapes were worn as ascots or bows at the neck, over the hair, or tied onto handbags. Cigarette holders were revived as sophisticated accessories. Pearls were considered correct for both day and evening; fine and costume jewelry was often worn in matching sets of earrings, necklace, and bracelet; rhinestone accents appeared prolifically in jewelry, brooches, hair clips, buttons, and as buckles on shoes and bags.

=== Hair and beauty ===
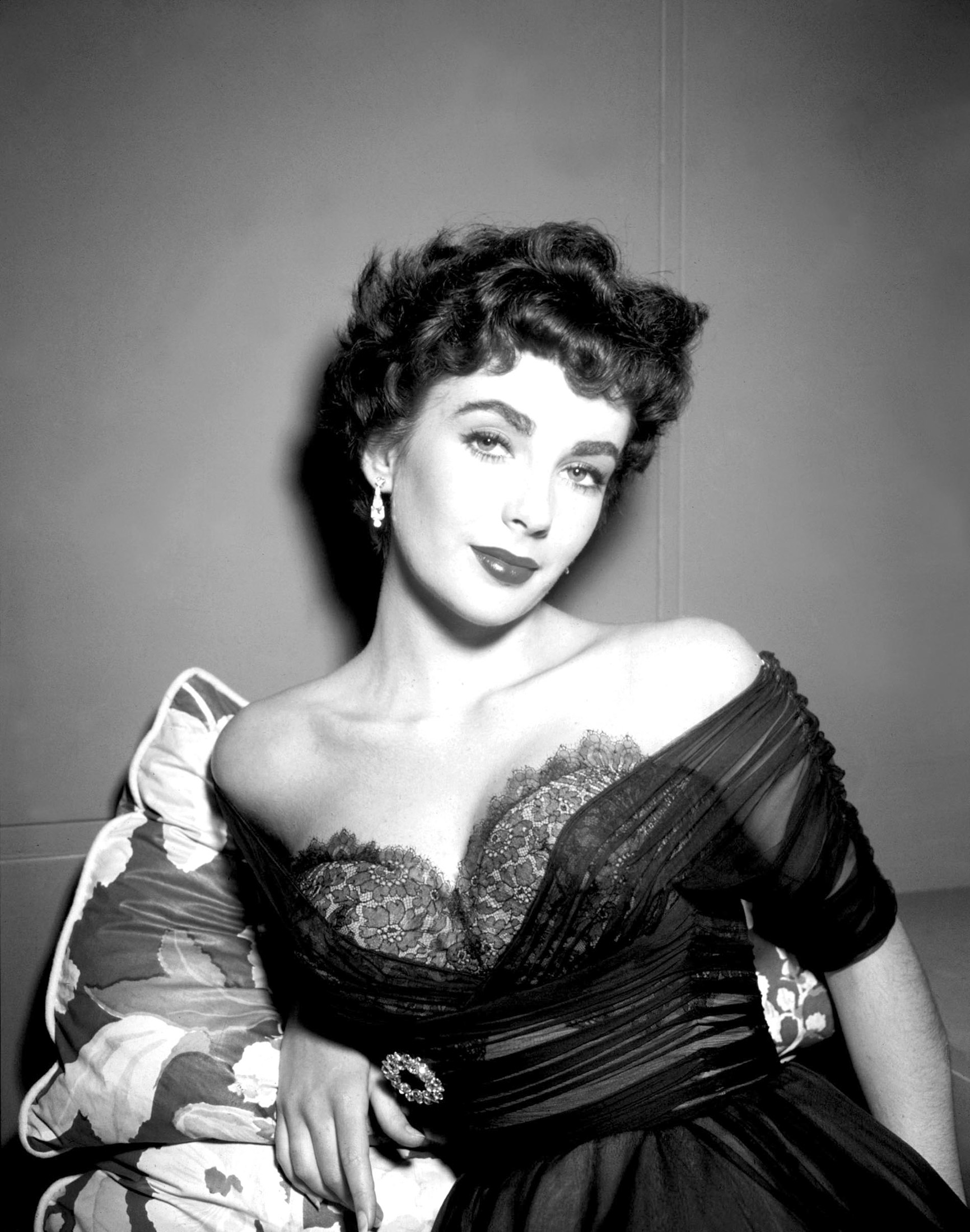
Elizabeth Taylor in The Girl Who Had Everything (1953).

The beauty standard of the 1950s was polished and mature—what Vogue in 1950 called "frankly make-believe make-up." Foundation and face powder were used for a matte finish; arched brows were drawn with dark eyebrow pencil; eyeliner was applied dramatically on the top lid and often extended outward to widen the eyes. Red lipstick dominated; Revlon's classic "Cherries in the Snow," introduced in 1953, was among the most fashionable shades. Long, polished nails were fashionable, with nail polish and lipstick colors matched or coordinated. After 1952, eye makeup became more pronounced; around 1956 colored eyeshadow began appearing in fashion magazines; and late in the decade, lighter-colored lipstick and fuller hairstyles offered a more youthful alternative to the earlier rigidly polished standard.

Women wore a great variety of hairstyles, most chin length or shorter and often sculpted by permanents. Hair was waved, cropped, and sometimes pulled back from the forehead or cut into "pixie" styles with pointy bangs. Popular styles reflected international influences: the short waved "Italian bob" and "Left Bank" bangs swept across the forehead were among the season's fashionable named styles. Hair coloring was openly advocated as a way to update one's style, referred to in advertising as a "tint" or "rinse."

=== Towards a new silhouette: 1955–1959 ===
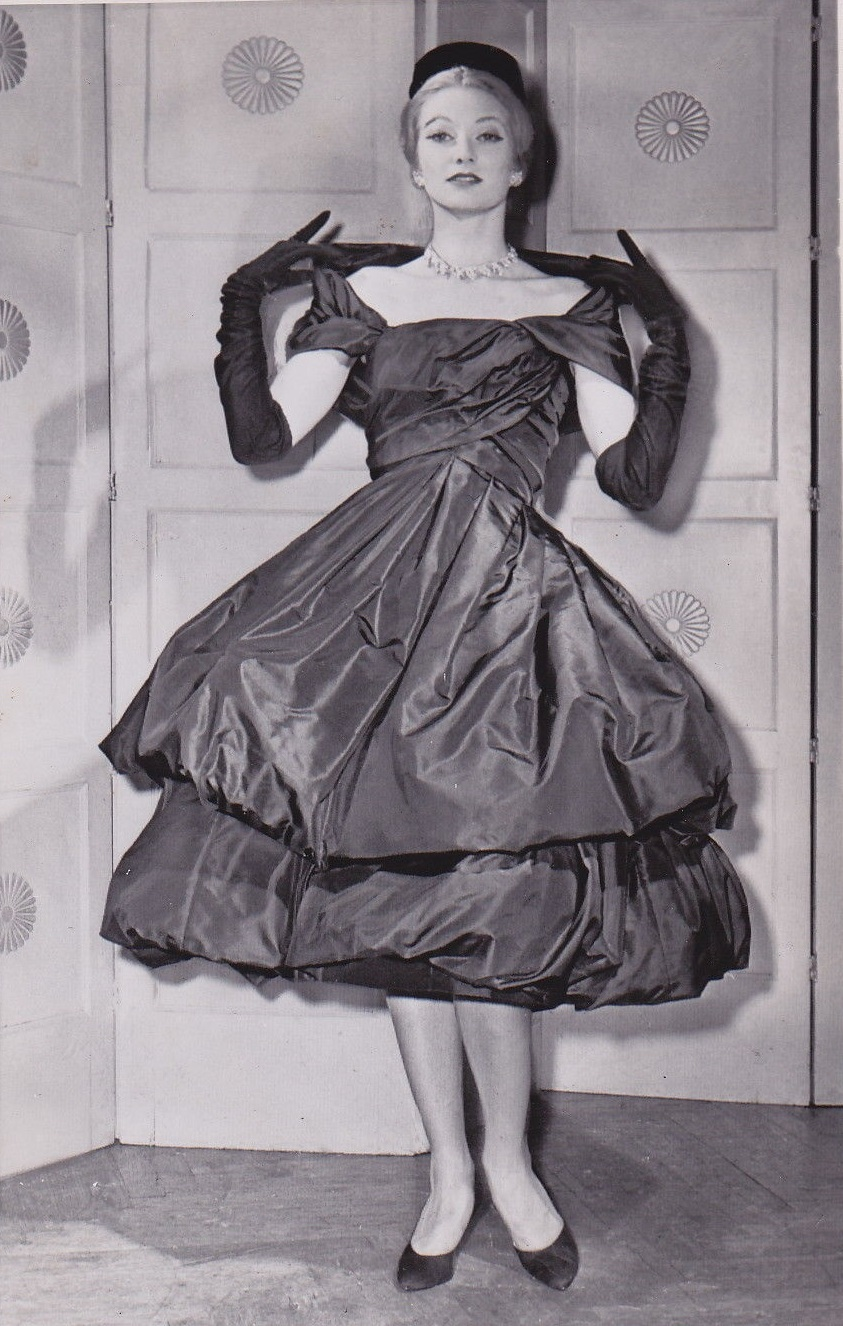
Black taffeta dress designed by Yves Saint Laurent for Dior, July 1959.

The first stirrings of change from the New Look silhouette appeared as early as the mid-1950s, when designers began showing unfitted styles as part of their collections. Balenciaga had already introduced an unfitted suit jacket in 1951 and showed an unfitted dress by 1954; Dior presented his A line in 1955; and by 1957 the "sack" (or "bag") dress—combining a loose body with a dropped waist that recalled the silhouettes of the 1920s, typically worn with an updated version of the cloche hat—had been launched by multiple designers. The term "chemise" was applied to a number of variations on the semi-fitted sheath.

These looser styles proved unpopular with many women, particularly in the United States. Norman Norell, writing in Women's Wear Daily in 1959, decried the conformity of American life and its effect on fashion, blaming the American husband more than his wife: "Essentially conservative and conformist, the American husband is worried lest his wife look different from other women." Of the sack look he wrote: "If a woman happened to buy the new silhouette, her husband gasped, that night a TV comedian made fun of it, and the next day she brought it back to the store." By the end of the decade, however, shorter and straighter dresses were beginning to appear in retail stores. In 1958 L'Officiel showed dresses with a "modern impression"—hemlines at the knee, skirts standing away from the body, ranging from A-line to bubble-shaped. Bubble hems were seen frequently on cocktail dresses; some evening gowns featured trains or uneven hemlines much longer at the back. At the house of Dior, Yves Saint Laurent—who had been with the house since 1954—presented his first collection in 1958 and transformed the A-line silhouette into the "Trapeze," available in a day version with practical patch pockets and a cocktail version with a bubble hem.

=== Key designers ===
==== France ====
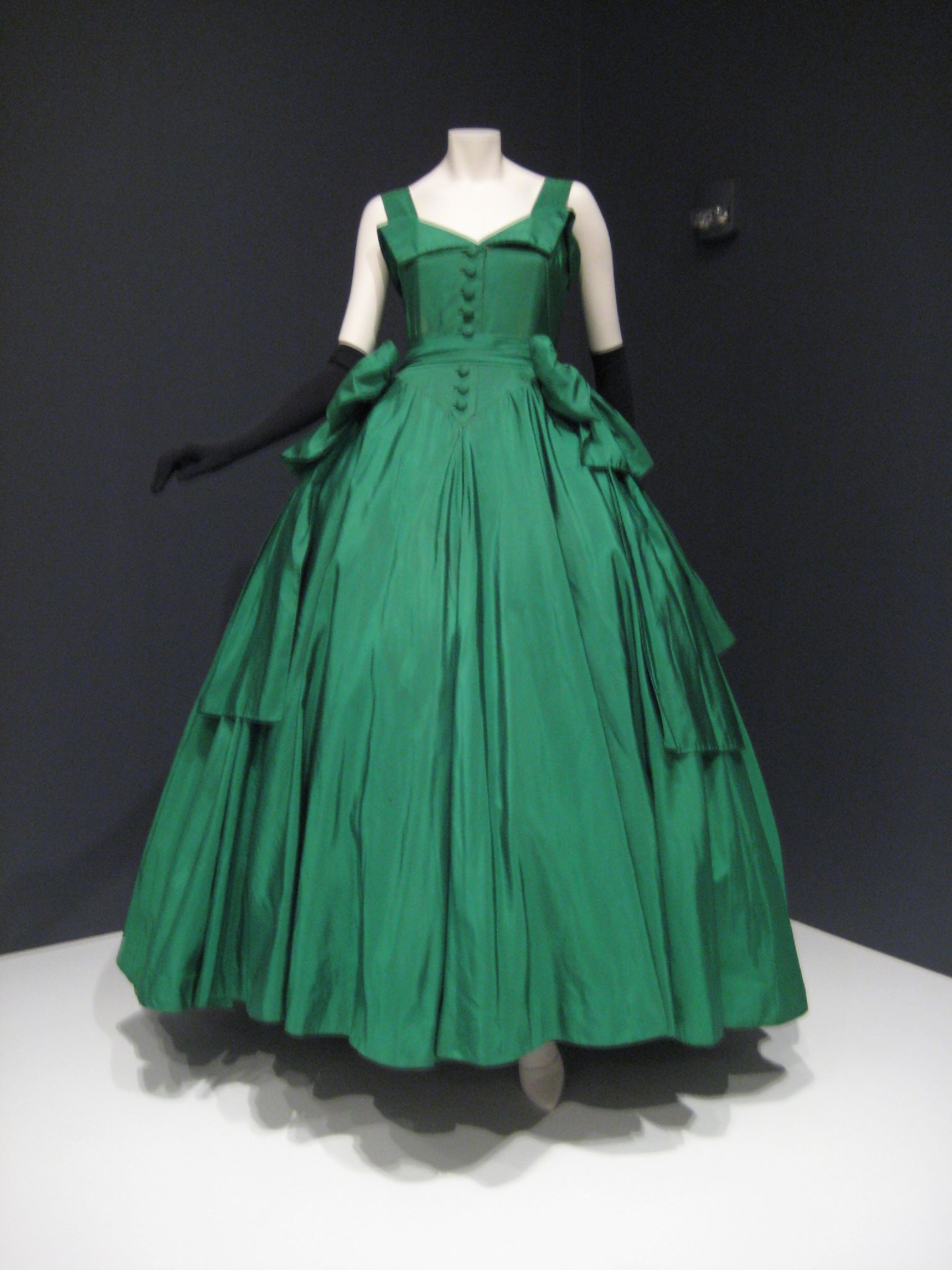
A 1954 evening dress by Christian Dior.

By 1950 Christian Dior was the most famous fashion designer in the world, his business generating a remarkable share of the entire French fashion industry's revenue. Licensing agreements expanded throughout the decade; a fur salon opened in 1951; and he developed an unprecedented global distribution system with branches in London, Caracas, Santiago, and Sydney, alongside deals with Holt Renfrew in Canada and the Japanese department store Daimaru in 1953—among the first such arrangements with an Asian retailer. In collaboration with shoe designer Roger Vivier, his accessories line was equally expansive. The house made lavish use of exquisite fabrics with floral embellishments; the muguet (lily of the valley) was a recurring motif, and basket-weave appeared as both a fabric treatment and on the bergère hats that frequently completed his ensembles. Dior appeared on the cover of Time in 1957; his death later that year brought Yves Saint Laurent to the head of the house.

Cristóbal Balenciaga stood apart from—and in many respects above—the rest of the couture world. Though less celebrated than Dior in the popular press, his mastery of cut, seaming, and finish earned him the epithet "Picasso of fashion." His mature clientele prized his suits and coats for their combination of fashion-forwardness and timelessness; in eveningwear he excelled in large-volume taffeta and gazar dresses cut on the straight grain and gathered from rectangular pieces, resulting in architectural gowns and bubble-hemmed cocktail dresses. His "cocoon" suit had appeared as early as 1947; a sack line followed in 1952; trapezoid baby-doll dresses in 1957–58; and his 1958 silhouettes—loose bodies with high or low waists—clearly forecast the aesthetic of the 1960s. Standaway collars, oversized buttons, and seven-eighths-length sleeves were among his trademarks, and designers who trained under him—among them André Courrèges, Emanuel Ungaro, and Hubert de Givenchy—all bore the indelible stamp of his influence.

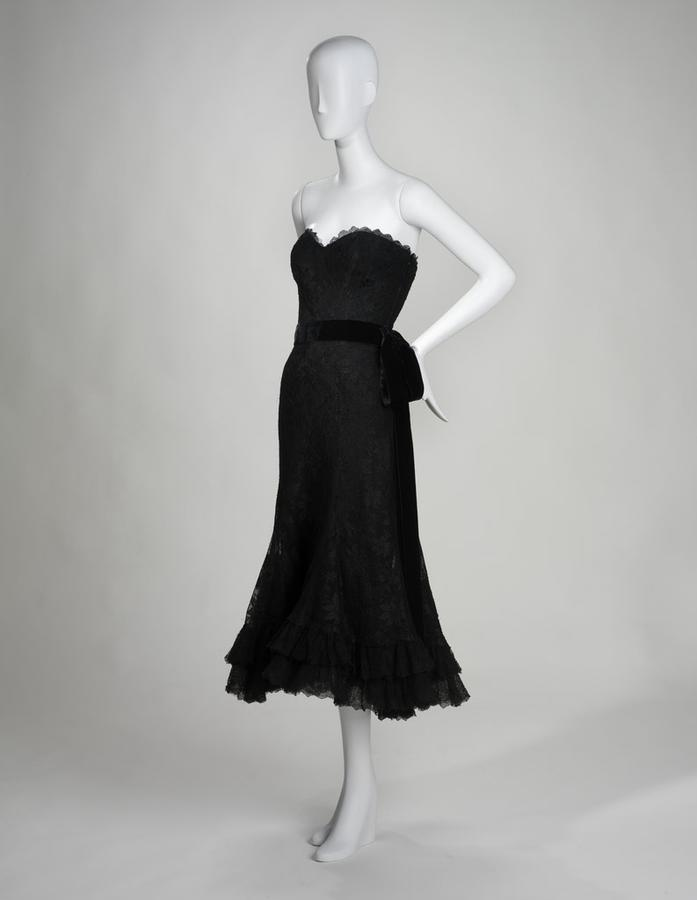
A strapless evening dress by Coco Chanel, in black lace with velvet sash, 1958.

Jacques Fath epitomized Parisian chic with a theatrical, femme-fatale aesthetic: impeccably tailored suits with dramatic decorative details, extremely fitted skirts paired with swing coats or long-peplum jackets, and unusual material combinations such as jersey, lace, and sable. He branched out into fragrance, accessories, and the lower-priced "Fath de Fath" prêt-à-porter line, distributed in America by manufacturer Joseph Halpert. He died of leukemia in 1954; his widow Geneviève maintained the business until it closed in 1957.

Pierre Balmain continued his rise to international prominence throughout the decade. His daywear was polished and geometric, often with leopard fur trim; his eveningwear drew on 18th- and 19th-century references through embroidery, bows, ruched trimming, and bustle-shaped skirts. He opened boutiques in the United States in 1952, received the Neiman Marcus Award in 1955, and his Jolie Madame fragrance was among the decade's most successful.

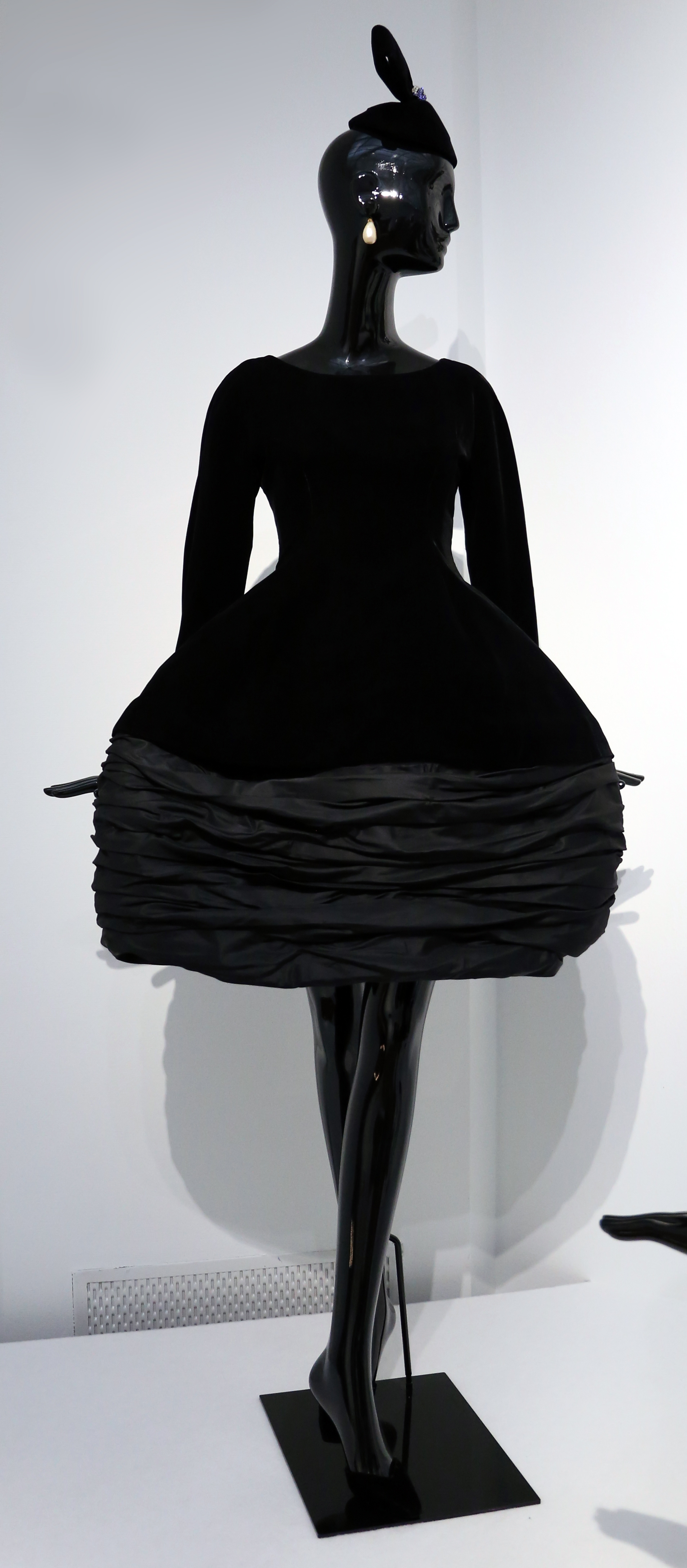
A 1957 cocktail dress designed by Hubert de Givenchy.

Coco Chanel did not reopen her atelier until February 1954, after more than a decade's absence. Her first postwar collection was poorly received—the boxy tailored Chanel look seemed out of step with the fitted silhouettes dominating high fashion—but her simple ensembles in richly textured bouclés and tweeds soon began influencing other designers, especially in the American career market. In 1955 she introduced the quilted handbag with a chain handle, which became a house classic, and received the Neiman Marcus Award in 1957.

Madame Grès (Alix) was especially celebrated for her "Grecian" evening dresses: yards of fine silk jersey or chiffon pleated into fluted columns that, despite exposing shoulders, arms, or back, concealed a sophisticated hidden infrastructure of boning and bra cups greatly appreciated by clients. Her loyal clientele included the Duchess of Windsor and American heiress Doris Duke; at the end of the decade she launched her first fragrance, Cabochard.

Hubert de Givenchy opened his maison in 1952 with a collection immediately hailed as "dazzling" and "youthful," and by 1955 was moving toward simpler sheath and chemise dresses with hemlines just below the knee. His style became globally familiar through his designs for Audrey Hepburn: the black-and-white evening dress she wore in Sabrina (1954) was widely admired, while Funny Face (1957) featured a complete Givenchy wardrobe that solidified his international reputation.

Pierre Cardin was among the designers active during the decade. Having trained at Paquin and Schiaparelli before assisting at Dior, he showed his first collection in 1953 and quickly distinguished himself with sculptural silhouettes including the Bubble dress of 1954. He opened boutiques for men and women—called Adam and Eve—in 1957, and in 1959 presented a women's ready-to-wear collection that led to his temporary expulsion from the Chambre Syndicale de la Haute Couture Parisienne. His geometric emphasis, bold graphic effects, and shorter hemlines already hinted at the futuristic aesthetic he would champion in the 1960s.

Among other active French houses, Nina Ricci's fragrance L'Air du Temps (launched 1948) remained a best-seller throughout the 1950s; Jacques Heim served as president of the Chambre Syndicale de la Haute Couture Parisienne from 1958 to 1962; Antonio Castillo became creative director of Lanvin in 1950, temporarily renaming the label Lanvin-Castillo; and Carmen de Tommaso (known as Carven) became known for youthful collections inspired by global travel and her highly successful perfume Ma Griffe.

==== United Kingdom ====
The 1953 coronation of Queen Elizabeth II created an enormous demand for gowns from London's couturiers, providing significant financial stimulation for the industry. Norman Hartnell designed the queen's coronation gown at her request, following the basic lines of her wedding dress—a sweetheart neckline and full skirt in satin, heavily beaded, jeweled, and embroidered with floral and plant emblems representing the realms of the Crown. He also designed coronation gowns for the Queen Mother, Princess Margaret, the Duchess of Kent, and the maids of honor. Hardy Amies received his first commission from Princess Elizabeth in 1950 and was awarded a royal warrant in 1955; Victor Stiebel served as house designer for Jacqmar through most of the decade, producing couture eveningwear while also designing uniforms for the Women's Royal Navy Service and Women's Royal Air Force; and John Cavanagh, after assisting Pierre Balmain from 1947 to 1952, opened his own London house to considerable success, his 1953 coronation collection noted for quality of cut and a delicate sense of color.

==== United States ====
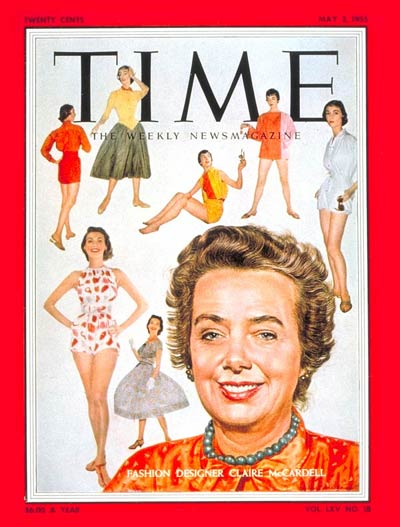
Claire McCardell on the cover of Time, 2 May 1955.

American designers continued originating influential styles in sportswear and tailored pieces. The American look was well-groomed but without the exaggeration of much European fashion, its natural context suburban living, outdoor activities, and informality. Claire McCardell received a degree of recognition virtually unprecedented for an American designer: honored by the Women's Press Club in 1950, the subject of a Beverly Hills gallery retrospective in 1953, and featured on the cover of Time in 1955. Her 1956 book What Shall I Wear? articulated a design philosophy built on relaxed, inventive ideas—self-ties, exposed hooks and eyes, cowl hoods, topstitching, wrap constructions, and day fabrics used for evening. She died of cancer in March 1958, having completed her final collection just weeks before her death.

Norman Norell applied couture-level quality to ready-to-wear under the Traina-Norell label; his sequined evening "mermaid" sheaths remained his most popular and identifiable designs throughout the decade. The 1950s proved the most important decade of Charles James' career: his work grew increasingly sculptural, culminating in the celebrated Cloverleaf gown (1953), whose skirt projected outward in the shape of a four-leaf clover, its internal structure a marvel of engineering involving nylon mesh, taffeta, boning, and intricate seaming.

Anne Fogarty created exuberantly feminine dresses with extremely full skirts supported by nylon horsehair petticoats, winning the Coty Award in 1951 and the Neiman Marcus Award in 1952. Bonnie Cashin, winner of both awards in 1950, established Bonnie Cashin, Inc. in 1951, offering sportswear distinguished by a masterful approach to materials: textured tweeds with metallic Lurex accents, utility metal toggle closures, and innovative use of leather and fur.

Among other significant American figures, Mollie Parnis was a favorite of First Lady Mamie Eisenhower; Nettie Rosenstein designed Eisenhower's inaugural ball gown in 1953; Pauline Trigère won Coty Awards in 1951 and 1959; James Galanos launched Galanos Originals in Los Angeles in 1952; Arnold Scaasi won the Coty Award in 1958 and the Neiman Marcus Award in 1959; and Mainbocher created Mary Martin's costumes for the 1959 Broadway production of The Sound of Music. Anne Klein had established Junior Sophisticates in 1948 to offer junior-sized versions of refined sportswear, recognizing the desire of teenage and college-age girls for more adult styling, and received a Coty Award in 1955 for this innovation.

==== Italy ====
An important group showing of Italian designers in Florence in 1951 caught the attention of the international fashion press and helped establish Italy as a significant new design center. Italian fashion appealed to affluent Americans whose lifestyle was growing more informal, offering European flair without excessive formality at prices lower than comparable French styles, and was especially praised for its sportswear, separates, and accessories.

Emilio Pucci combined European prestige with comfort and ease at his boutique in Capri; his striped sweaters, narrow pants, and ski clothes in a distinctive vivid palette came to epitomize the colorful, sporty spirit of Italian fashion. The Sorelle Fontana sisters—Zoe, Micol, and Giovanna—became famous for lavish eveningwear and film designs, dressing Ava Gardner for The Barefoot Contessa (1954) and counting Elizabeth Taylor among their clients. Alberto Fabiani was praised for superlative tailoring; his wife, Countess Simonetta Visconti, was equally known as a designer. Roberto Capucci opened his Rome house in 1950, quickly building a reputation for bold color, strong geometries, and feats of cut; his Box Line of 1958 was a crisp structural variation on the sack.

== Men's fashion ==
=== Mainstream trends ===
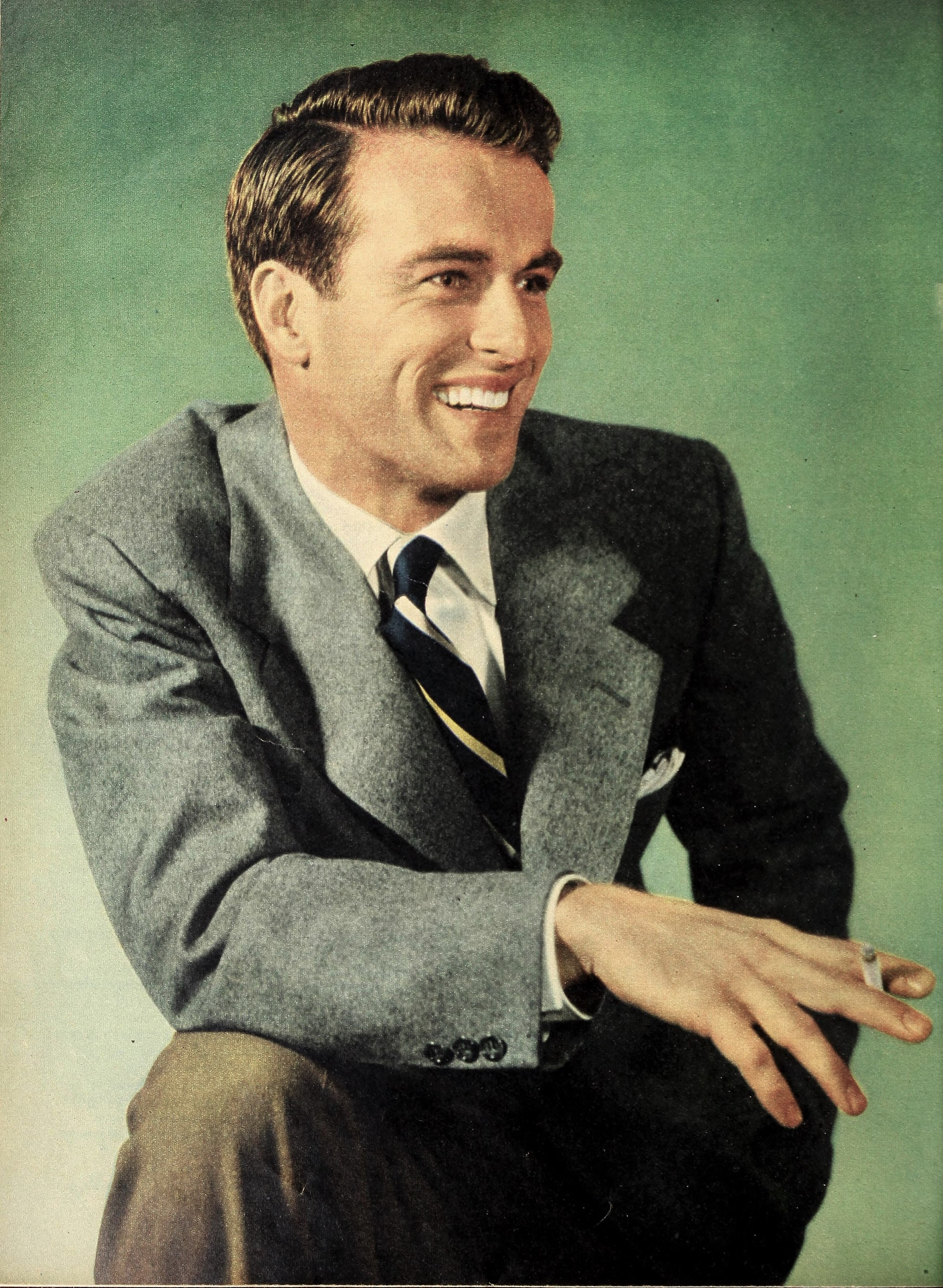
Montgomery Clift in a publicity still by Max Coplan, 1950.

After years in wartime uniform, men returned to civilian dress with what Esquire called the "Bold Look" in October 1948—broad-shouldered jackets, long-roll lapels, and predominantly double-breasted suits. By the early 1950s this had evolved into the slimmer, more restrained "Ivy League" style: a single-breasted jacket, slightly loose with notched lapels, lightly padded shoulders, and a center back vent; trousers typically unpleated, straight-legged, and usually cuffed. The style was closely associated with traditional manufacturers such as Brooks Brothers. Dark gray—particularly in flannel—was the most fashionable shade, and the era is sometimes nicknamed "the era of the gray flannel suit," a phrase popularized by Sloan Wilson's 1955 novel The Man in the Gray Flannel Suit (filmed in 1956 with Gregory Peck), which used the garment as a symbol of corporate conformity and the sacrifice of individuality.

In Britain, Savile Row tailors revived a near-Edwardian formality: slightly fitted dark suits, some with striped trousers, were worn with Chesterfield coats, bowler hats, and well-polished black Oxford shoes. An alternative aesthetic came from Italy: in 1952, the Italian menswear industry organized a Men's Fashion Festival in San Remo to showcase Italian design, tailoring, and fine fabrics. The Italian "Continental" suit featured shorter, straighter jackets with two side back vents and narrow trousers without pleats or cuffs; thigh-length overcoats were cut to be comfortable on Vespas, the motor scooters popular in Italian cities. These streamlined styles, worn with thin-soled supple shoes, helped usher in the more modern aesthetic that dominated menswear in the late 1950s and beyond.

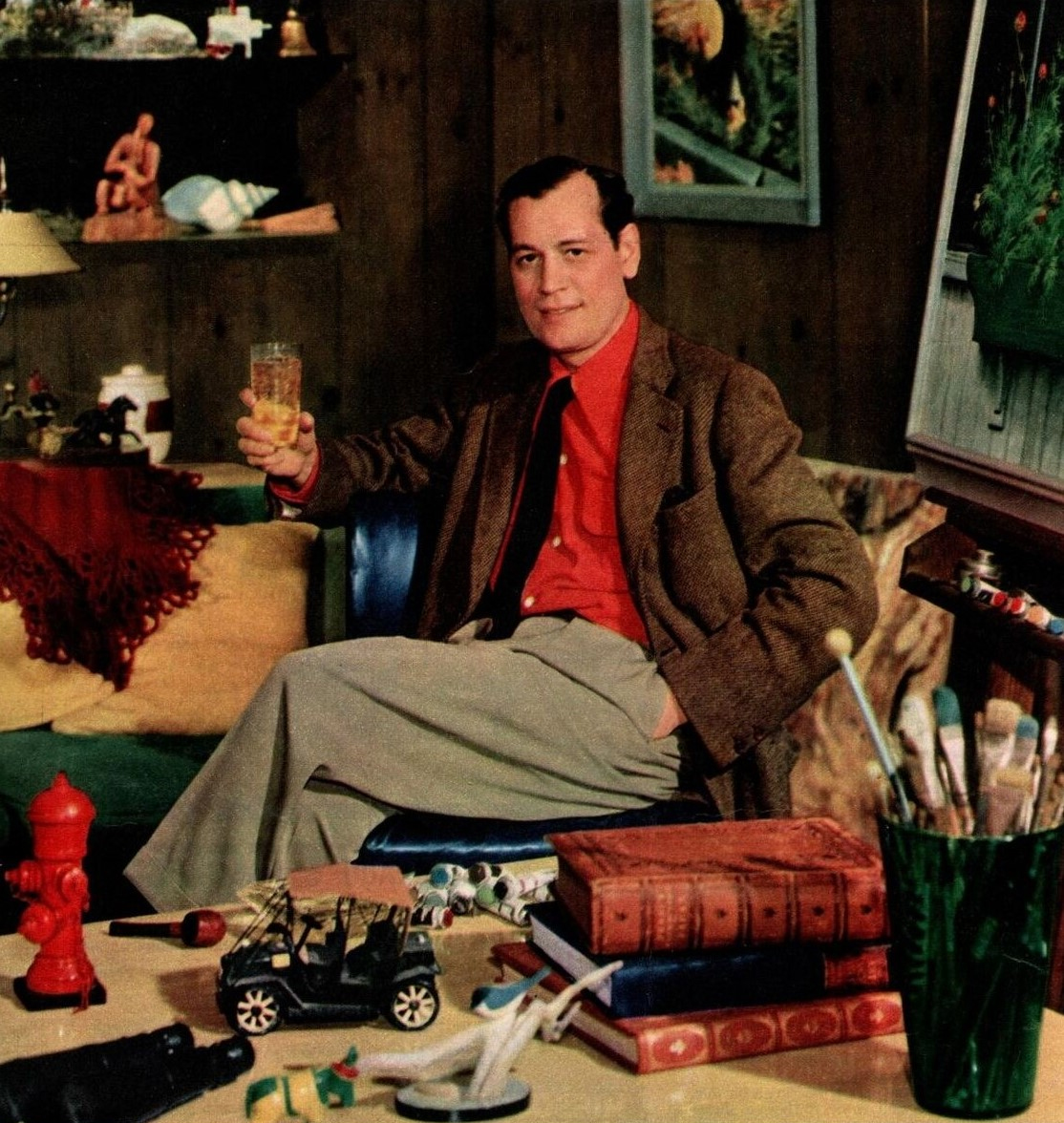
Stevan Dohanos posing for a whiskey advertisement, 1951.

Shirts provided the most visible avenue for color in otherwise conservative business dress. The early black-and-white television cameras made white shirts appear somewhat dingy on screen, prompting men appearing on television to wear blue shirts—which read as more "white" to the camera—and shirt manufacturers began producing colored shirts for wider consumption. The introduction met with some resistance, as certain employers banned colored shirts with business suits, but shades including pink and light blue gradually became accepted. Neckties were patterned with every imaginable motif—chess pieces, cocktails, landscapes, antique cars—in addition to standard paisley, dots, and stripes; through the decade, ties steadily narrowed toward a "skinny" width; Hermès began marketing neckties in 1953; and designer neckties gained momentum as top womenswear houses including Dior offered silk ties through their boutiques. Fanciful formal eveningwear offered another avenue for color and pattern, with dinner jackets in jewel tones, plaids, and iridescent effects; musical groups often performed in matching colorful jackets, helping to popularize showy evening looks.

=== Casual wear ===
Men's leisurewear was varied and often colorful. The aloha shirt continued in popularity throughout the decade; cowboy-style shirts with contrast yokes, decorative stitching, and pearly snaps reflected the enduring influence of Western wear; novelty pullovers described as "Miami" or "California" style were worn in warm weather and resort areas. Knee-length Bermuda shorts were worn with blazers and ties for "casual" dress occasions; poolside, swim trunks were paired with a terry-lined short-sleeved jacket in ensembles known as "cabana sets," also offered in "his and hers" versions reflecting the popular emphasis on family togetherness. Men's hats remained obligatory for most formal occasions; not until the late 1950s was it considered acceptable to go bareheaded. The fedora and the homburg—revived when President Eisenhower wore one to his inauguration in 1952 rather than the customary top hat—were the most fashionable styles, with brims generally narrower than in previous decades. Imported Italian shoes were fashionable especially for dress in the mid-1950s. Pierre Cardin was a pioneer in the designer menswear market, opening his boutique Adam in 1957 with collarless jackets and narrow unpleated pants worn with turtlenecks or round-collared shirts and narrow ties.

== Youth subcultures ==
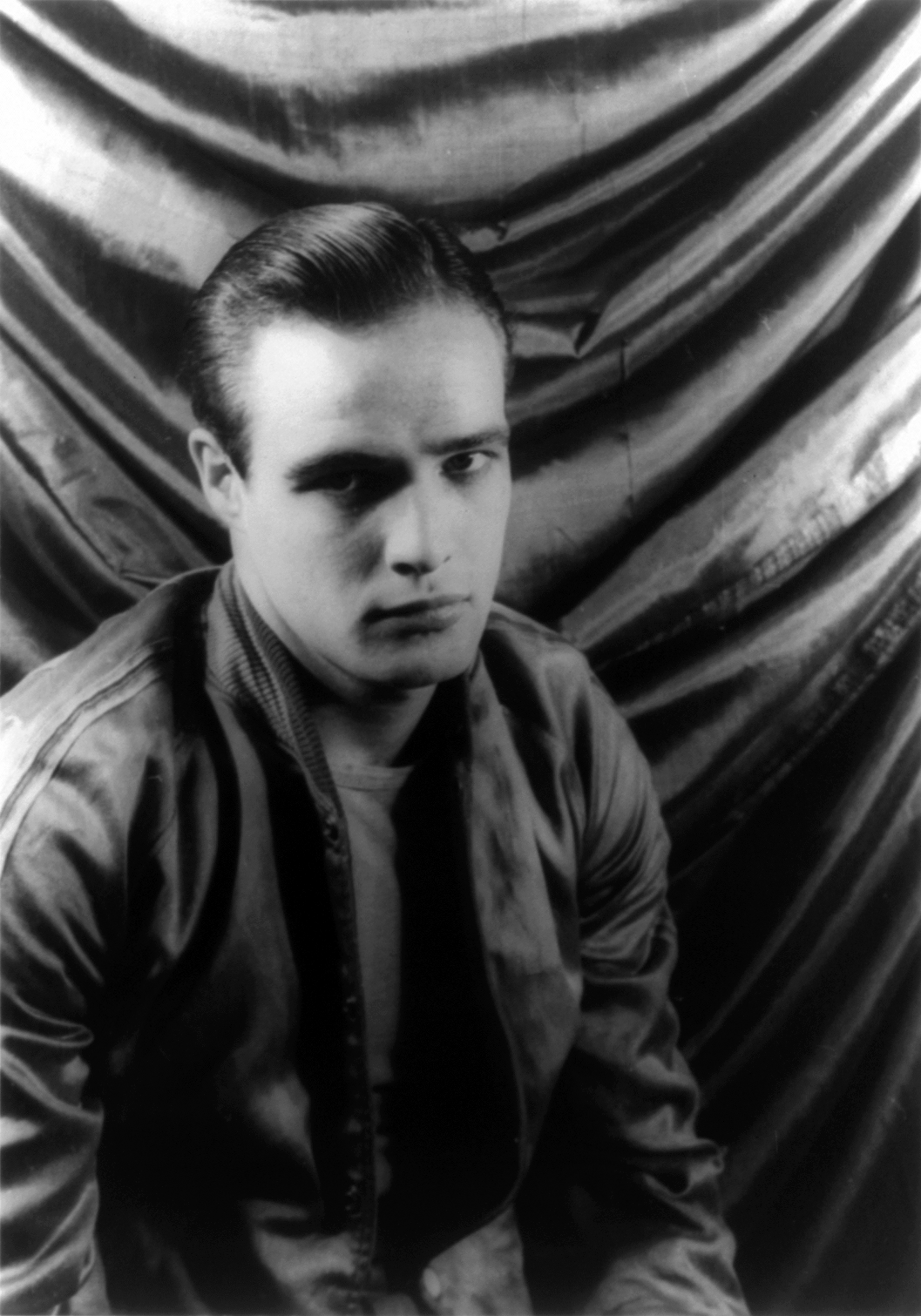
Marlon Brando in A Streetcar Named Desire (1951).

In the United States, American youth looked to rebellious Hollywood stars and musicians. Costume designer Lucinda Ballard, inspired by ditch-diggers she had observed on the street, dressed Marlon Brando for the Broadway and 1951 film productions of A Streetcar Named Desire in a very tight, torn T-shirt and jeans fitted to his body while wet, ensuring a snug sculptural fit—possibly the moment at which tight jeans made their decisive transition from workwear into fashion language. In 1953, Brando performed a similar "bad boy" role in The Wild One, wearing tight jeans paired with a black leather biker jacket and a military-style billed cap; the look rapidly spread into vernacular fashion and inspired les blousons noirs, an imitative youth style tribe that flourished in France and other parts of Europe in the late 1950s. In post-occupation Japan, youth who combined Brando's swagger with the influence of Elvis Presley became known as Rockabiri-zoku ("Rockabilly tribe").

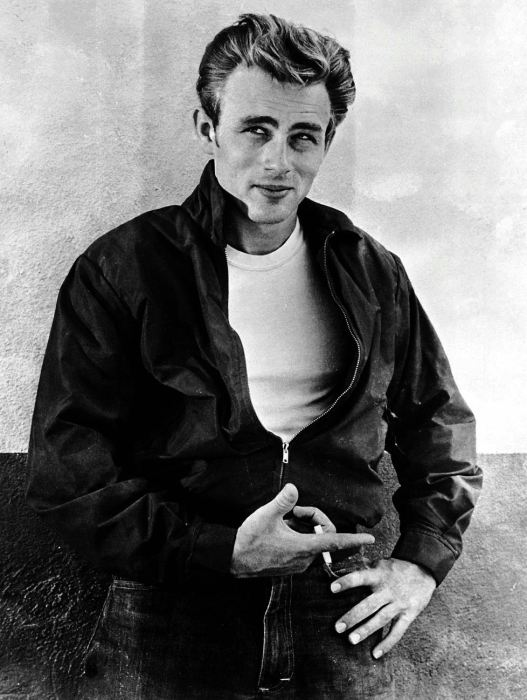
James Dean in Rebel Without a Cause (1955).

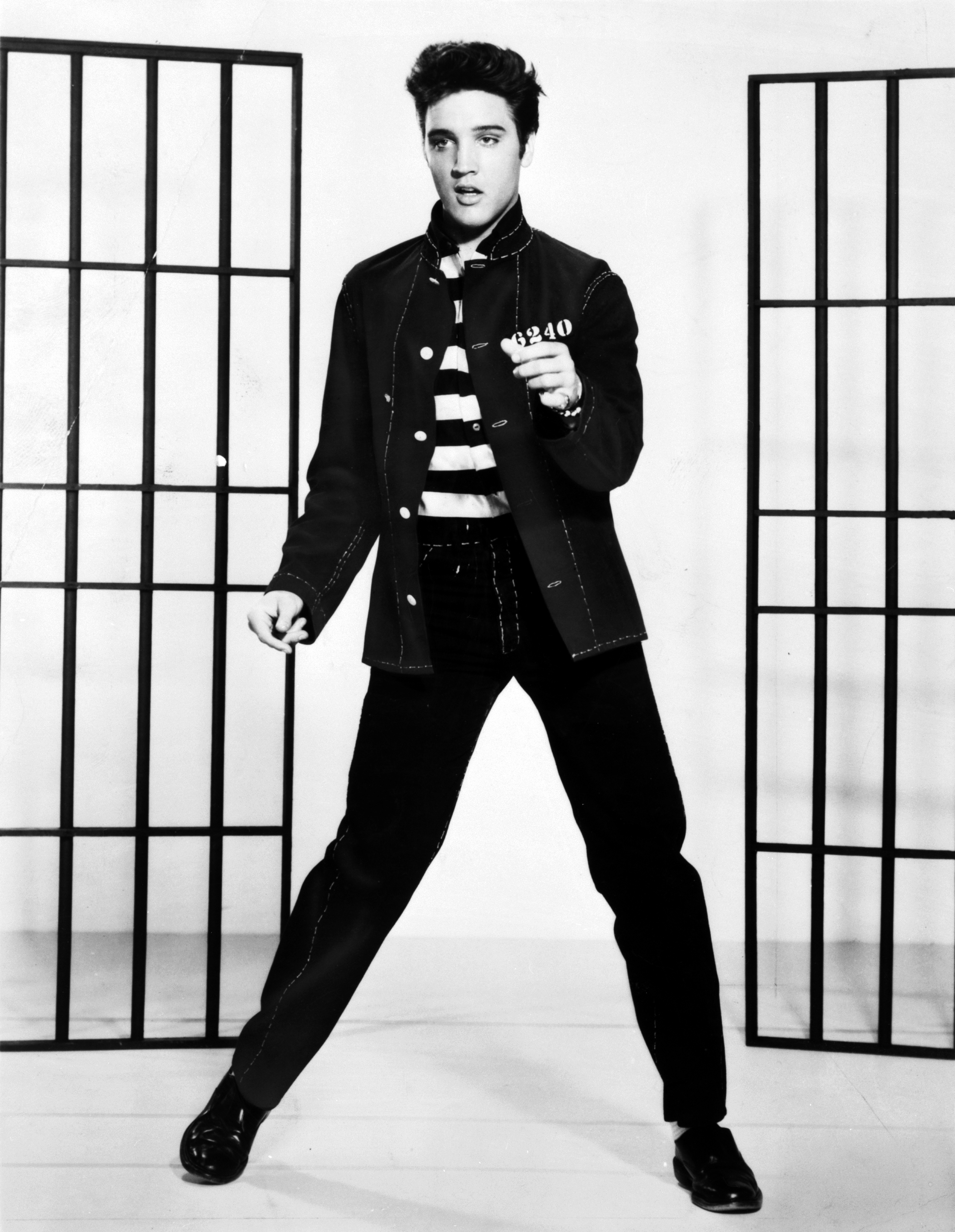
Elvis Presley in Jailhouse Rock (1957).

James Dean, in only three major film performances, became perhaps the most iconic fashion figure of the decade. His costumes for Rebel Without a Cause (1955), designed by Moss Mabry, consisted of a white T-shirt and blue jeans teamed with a red windbreaker that was instantly and widely imitated. Elvis Presley added further dimensions to the look: his signature pompadour hairstyle and his appearances in films including Jailhouse Rock (1957) further fueled the appeal of the working-class aesthetic for both American and international youth. Together, Brando and Dean ensured the rise of the white T-shirt, blue jeans, and greased-back hair as the pervasive youth fashion of the decade.

=== Teds ===
The 1950s saw an unprecedented assertion of independence by young people through clothing—a fundamental shift in the relationship between fashion and social class. The Teddy Boys, who emerged in working-class London neighborhoods around 1954, based their rebellious aesthetic on the Neo-Edwardian styles that had been introduced by certain Savile Row tailors and initially worn by upper-class artists and dandies including Cecil Beaton. These working-class young men appropriated the long velvet-collared jackets and narrow trousers, adding thick crêpe-soled shoes ("brothel creepers"), skinny string ties, and greased-back "Duck's Ass" (D.A.) hairdos inspired by American rock and roll musicians. Trousers were very narrow and sometimes short enough to reveal garishly colored socks; from the mid-1950s flat shoes were replaced by "winklepickers"—shoes with exaggeratedly pointed toes. The "Teddy Girls" or "Judies" —their female counterparts— wore long gray jackets over tight high-necked black sweaters and black skirts, combined with dark stockings and feminized versions of the winkle picker with very high heels. As fashion historian Elizabeth Ewing noted, the Teddy Boy phenomenon had a threefold significance: it was the first fashion promoted by the young for the young; the first to begin among the lower classes; and the first to serve as outward evidence of a lifestyle cult. As James Laver observed, what mattered was not merely the adoption of an upper-class style by working-class youth, "but the fact that young men from poor backgrounds could now afford relatively expensive clothes and accessories and had the confidence to make them part of their own distinctive style."

=== Greasers ===
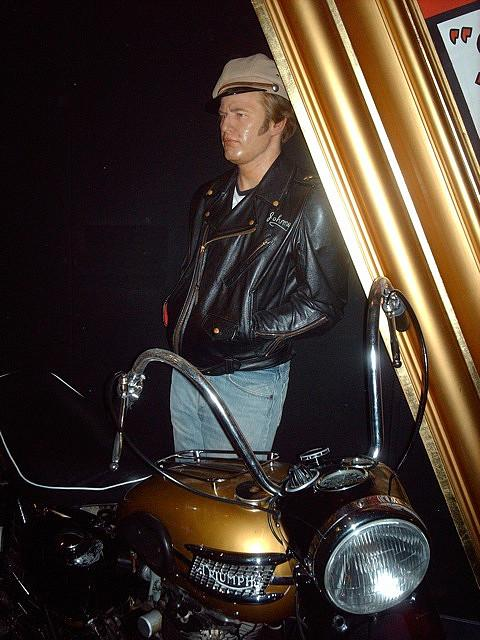
Marlon Brando's costume from The Wild One, 1953.

From the late 1940s until the mid-1960s, many Irish-American and Italian-American teenagers were involved with hot rodding, custom cars, and chopper bikes. American greasers, Japanese Bosozoku, Swedish Raggare and Aussie Bodgies based their look on the clothing worn by mechanics and fighter pilots, including a black Schott Perfecto leather jacket, blue jean jacket or canvas work jacket, black or white T shirt, button up short sleeve shirts with the sleeves rolled up several times sometimes having a flannel or other types of patterns, and blue Levi's 501 usually worn with either a large or small cuff at the hem, along with Engineer boots, Converse All Stars, penny loafers or other types of dress shoes, and cowboy boots. The British equivalent, known as the Ton-up Boys, dressed similarly but rode lightweight cafe racer Triumph and BSA bikes. Some girls wore jeans and leather jackets like the men, but most wore more typical college attire such as poodle skirts, petticoats, cardigan sweaters, and saddle shoes with bobby socks.

=== Beatniks ===
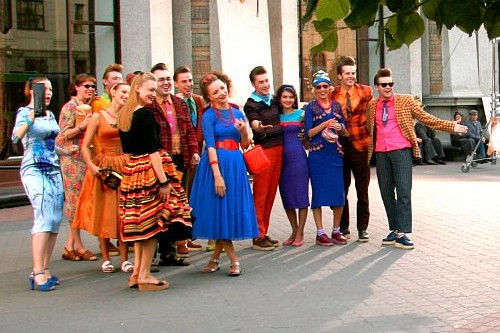
Modern actors dressed as 1950s Russian Beatniks or Stilyagi.

The "beatnik" subculture, the precursor to the 1960s hippies, emerged in New York during the latter part of the decade. The name combined "Beat" (after the literary Beat Generation of Kerouac, Ginsberg, and Corso) with "Sputnik," the Russian satellite launched in 1957. Beatniks mixed checked shirts, sweatshirts, jeans, and striped sweaters with ethnic styles; beards and goatees were a radical grooming choice in a clean-shaven era. Beatnik women favored dance leotards and peasant-style tops with wrap skirts, Capri pants, or jeans. European "Existentialists"—who frequented the cafés of the Boulevard Saint-Germain—contributed a parallel influence: contacts between the two circles led to the adoption of black clothes, turtlenecks, and berets for men, and leotards, tights, and ballet slippers for women. The beatnik aesthetic reached a wide mainstream audience through Audrey Hepburn's costumes in Funny Face (1957)—first as a shapeless-jumper-wearing bookstore clerk, then in cropped pants and flats in a Paris nightclub; her boyish gamine look was widely imitated by young women and had a significant impact on the coming decade's aesthetic.

The Russian equivalent of the Beatnik, known as Stilyagi (style hunters), wore thick soled shoes, brightly colored socks, and exaggerated American style clothing in imitation of Western film actors and modern jazz musicians.

=== Ivy League ===
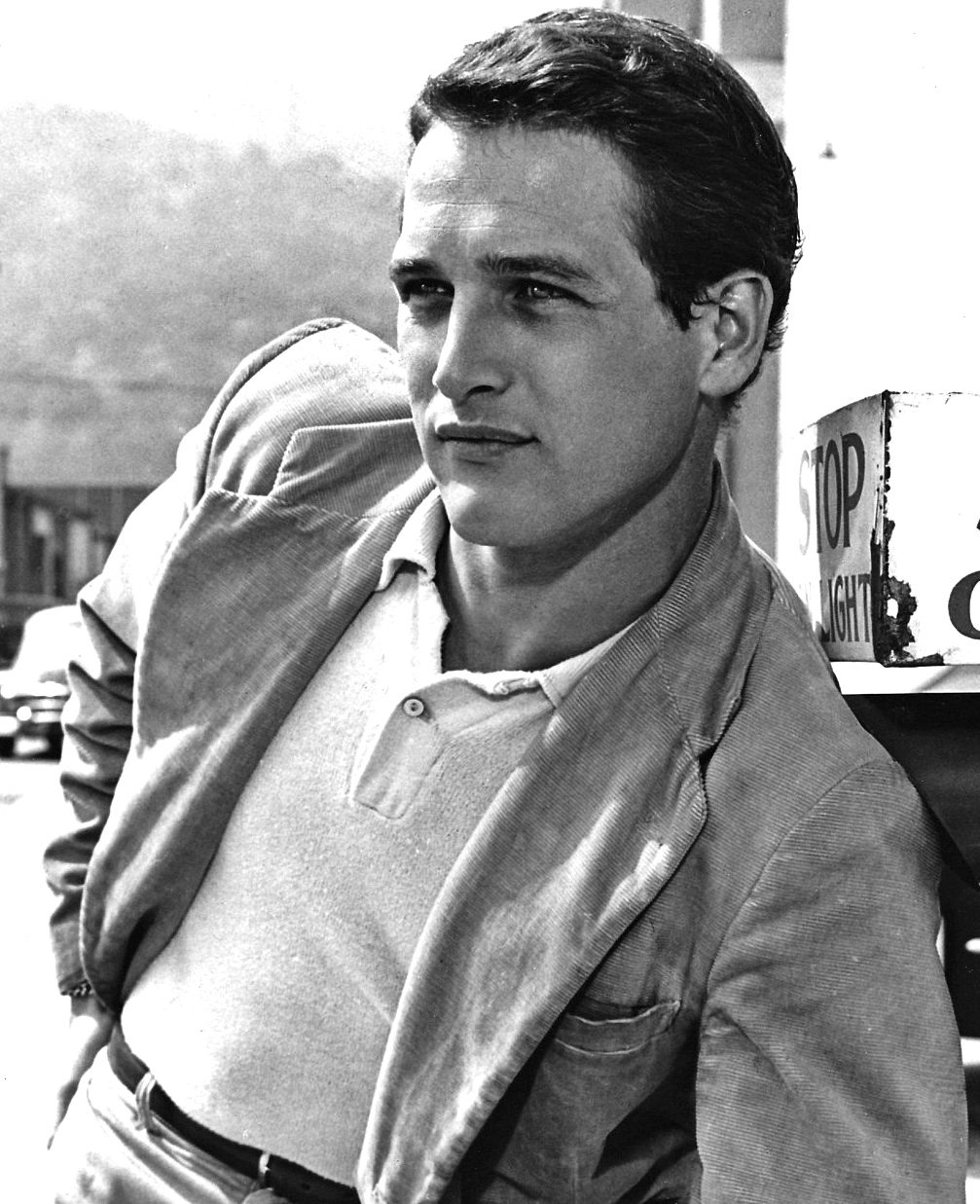
Paul Newman in casual Ivy League outfit

The early to mid 1950s also witnessed the Ivy League look among young, wealthy high school and college students in the Eastern United States. Due to the GI Bill, more men were able to go to college and aspired to imitate both the wardrobe and the athletic pursuits of the long-established upper class students. Typical hairstyles included the crew cut, Harvard clip, and regular haircut, and common accessories included cardigan sweaters, sweater vests, Nantucket reds, khaki chino pants, white Oxford shirts, Tootal or Brooks Brothers ties, Ascot neckties, tartan, grey tweed cloth or flannel sportcoats, and seersucker blazers in the South. Known as Squares, Socs, and Jocks, this subculture underwent a revival in the 1980s as the preppy look.

== Children's fashion ==
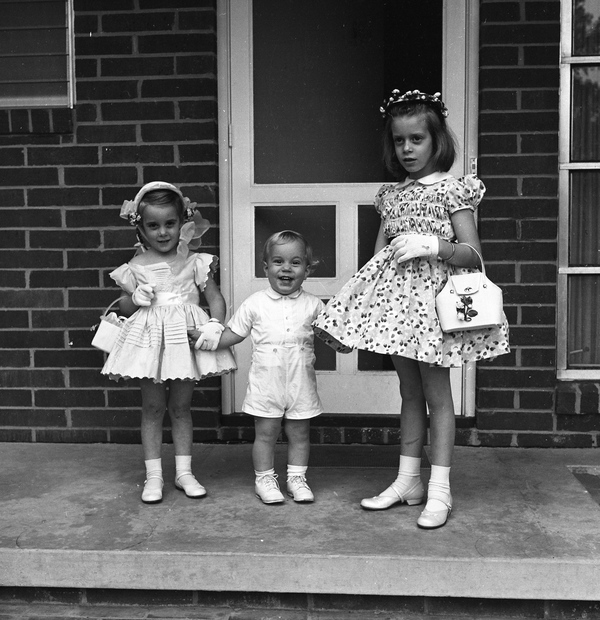
Children dressed for Easter in Tallahassee, Florida, 1957.

Children's fashion in the 1950s echoed the trends of adult dress, and wardrobes for young people were larger and more consciously fashionable than ever before. Manufacturers appealed to parents with easy-care fabric blends and finishes, and the market was vigorously promoted. Movies and television exerted a powerful influence on children's play clothes: The Roy Rogers Show and the Davy Crockett craze inspired cowboy and frontier-style fringed pullovers, sueded fabrics, and the famous "coonskin" cap; Flash Gordon encouraged a Space Age look.

Girls' wardrobes prioritized formality and matching accessories, much as their mothers' did. Dresses with full skirts and fitted bodices echoed the adult silhouette—princess-line styles, full circular skirts, and jumpers, all completed with carefully styled hair, white ankle socks, and shiny black patent leather shoes. Party and dance dresses featured very full skirts supported by tulle crinolines; pastel colors, impressionistic florals, and bows were typical. Girls were often dressed in matching outerwear ensembles—coat and hat coordinated—and for the coldest weather might wear matching trousers under their dresses, removing them at their destination.

The poodle skirt—a full circle of felt with a poodle (or other motif such as horses, musical notes, or telephones) appliquéd in a contrasting color, with rhinestones for the dog's collar and eyes—was the decade's most enduring teenage fashion fad, credited to Juli Lynne Charlot of California; it was worn with ankle socks, two-tone saddle shoes, a white shirt, and a small neck scarf. The style gained further currency when Princess Elizabeth wore a felt circle skirt with appliqué decoration on an official visit to Canada, encouraging its widespread adoption among teenage girls.

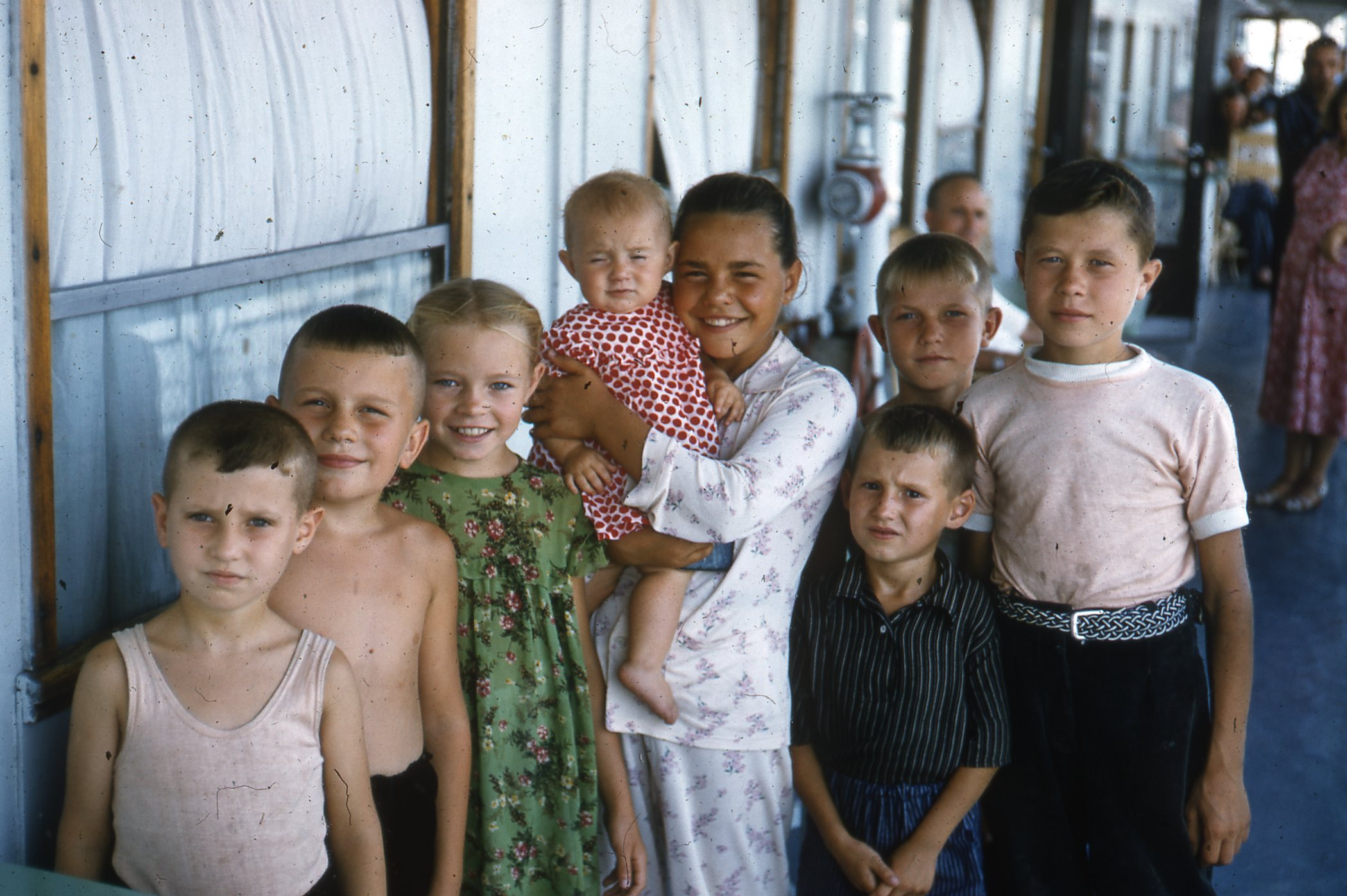
A group of children in the Soviet Union, 1958.

The teenage market continued to expand rapidly. Frankie Avalon's 1959 hit "Bobby Sox to Stockings" immortalized the social milestone of transition from ankle socks to nylons. The introduction of the Barbie doll in 1959, envisioned as a "Teen-age Fashion Model" and named after the teenage daughter of toy designer Ruth Handler, reflected the decade's preoccupation with the markers of maturity: the doll was born with full breasts, a tiny waist, and feet shaped for high heels—inspired, improbably, by the German novelty doll Bild Lilli.

Boys' fashion moved toward increasing casualness. The practice of dressing young boys in jackets and knickers before adolescence was largely abandoned; most boys' suits had long pants and resembled those of adult men, with Eton jackets and blazers for younger boys. Jeans were not worn to school but were the standard choice for play; colorful patterned short-sleeved collared shirts were popular for everyday wear; and knitted sweaters and cardigans were common. Plaid vests and miniature gray flannel suits—just like those of their fathers—were made for boys; most pattern companies of the period also offered patterns for mother–daughter look-alike outfits, reflecting the decade's emphasis on family togetherness.

Children's outdoor clothing ranged from matching princess-line dress coats with coordinating hats for girls, to practical waist-length jackets and nylon or woolen parkas with snowpants for boys. Flat shoes, Oxfords, loafers, Mary Janes, and ballerina flats were worn for school; sneakers for play; knee socks and anklets were typical, and keeping children's socks clean was a focus of grooming.

== Fashion media and film ==
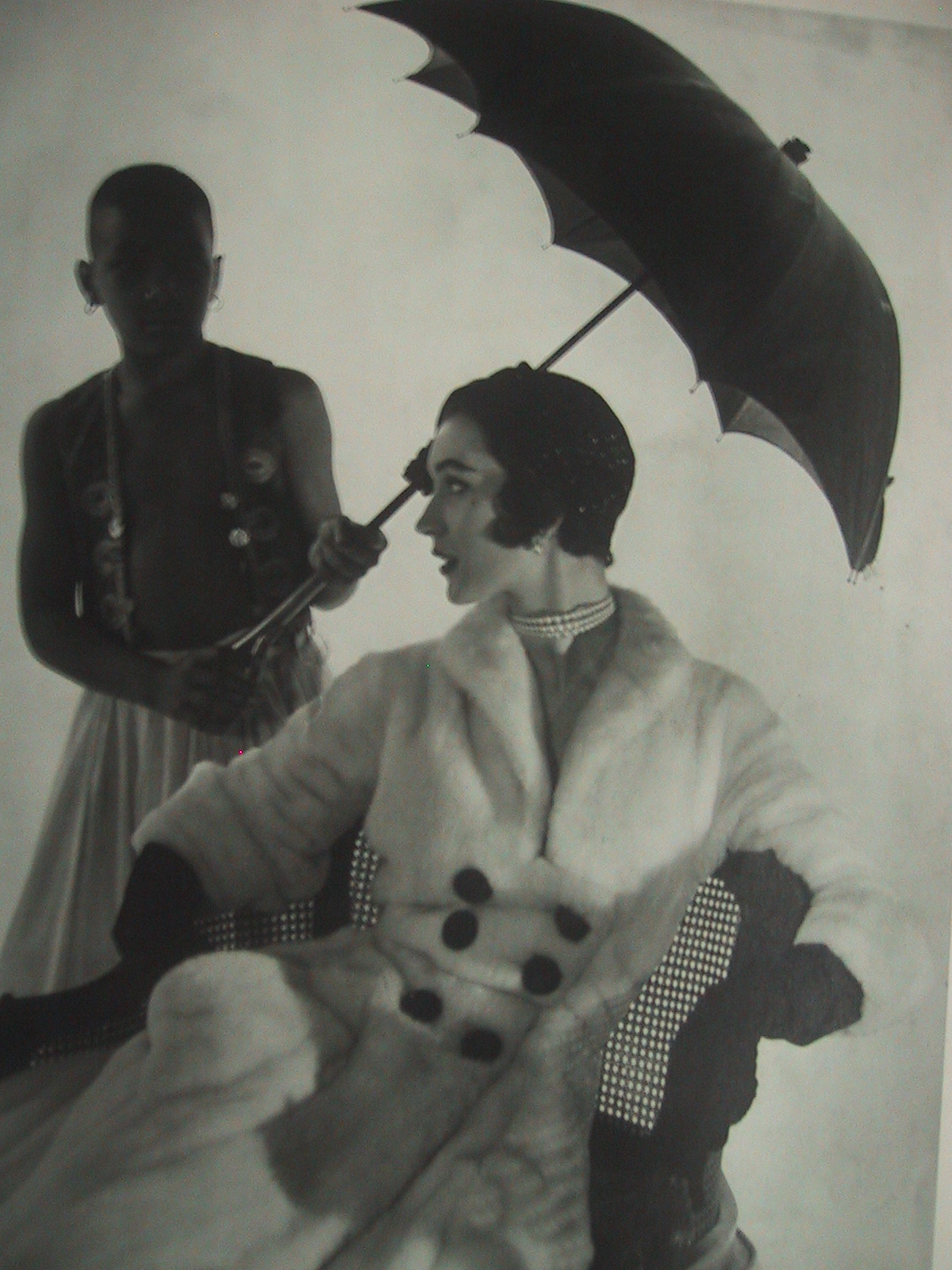
Fashion model Dovima photographed in the 1950s by Edgar de Evia.

Photography had definitively supplanted illustration as the dominant visual form on the covers and inside pages of leading fashion periodicals. The careers of Cecil Beaton, John Rawlings, Erwin Blumenfeld, and Louise Dahl-Wolfe remained active, and they were joined by a new generation including Richard Avedon, Irving Penn, Norman Parkinson, and John French, who broke from studio conventions to use the circus, nightclubs, and even the subway as locations for fashion photography. Through their memorable images, models such as Dovima, Barbara Goalen, and Suzy Parker became recognizable celebrities rather than anonymous faces. The tone of fashion writing was instructive, even high-handed: magazines reinforced a systematic, rules-driven approach, suggesting "blueprints" for each season with charts detailing wardrobe pieces, accessories, fabrics, and even makeup colors. Influential editors at major publications included Edna Woolman Chase and Jessica Daves at American Vogue; Audrey Withers at British Vogue; Michel de Brunhoff, succeeded by Edmonde Charles-Roux, at French Vogue; and Carmel Snow at Harper's Bazaar until 1957, with Diana Vreeland also on the staff. The dictatorial fashion editor became a familiar cultural type, gently satirized by Kay Thompson as Miss Prescott in Funny Face (1957).

New magazines catered to emerging audiences: Charm—"the magazine for women who work"—combined fashion and career advice; Ebony magazine's "Fashion Fair" was a traveling show of high fashion targeted at Black Americans; Gentry (introduced 1951) offered upscale lifestyle and fashion advice to men; and Sports Illustrated (first published 1954) devoted significant coverage to sports clothing.

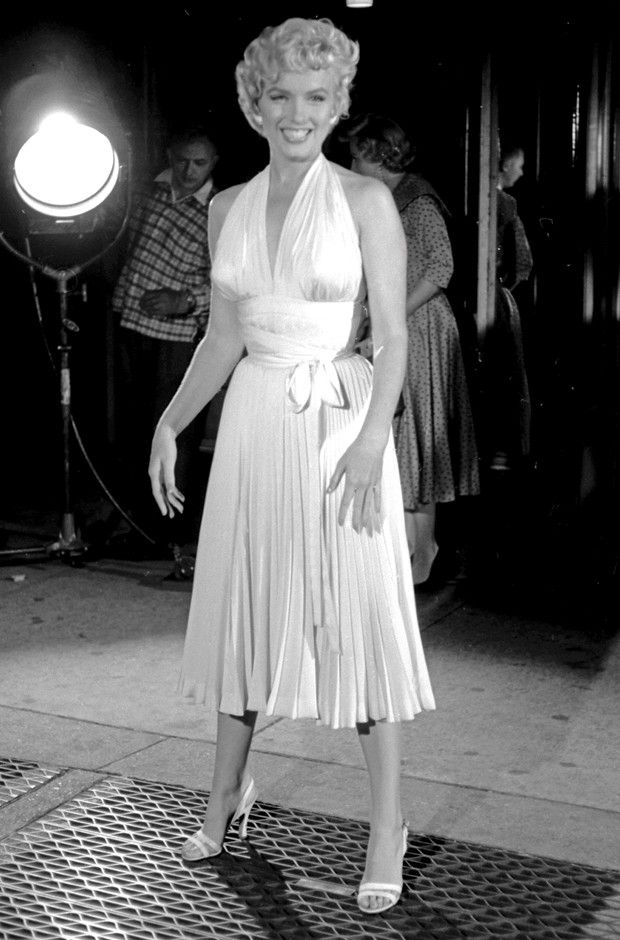
Marilyn Monroe in her famous white dress for The Seven Year Itch (1955).

Television became commercially available around 1948, and by the 1950 census five million American families reported owning a set. As a medium for the spread of fashion information, its influence was especially strong among the young: white buckskin shoes ("white bucks") became popular after singer Pat Boone wore them; Elvis Presley-look-alike pompadours spread rapidly; and a slick combed-back hairstyle was widely copied from the character "Kookie" on 77 Sunset Strip. The live te|levision broadcast of Queen Elizabeth's coronation in 1953 was watched by over twenty million viewers. When Lucille Ball's real-life pregnancy was incorporated into the 1952–1953 season of I Love Lucy, it brought unprecedented public attention to maternity clothing; in a more light-hearted vein, her character's Pendleton "49er" overshirt worn during a camping episode helped make the style synonymous with the suburban American lifestyle.

In Hollywood, film designers continued to exert significant fashion influence. William Travilla (1920–1990) created two of the decade's most iconic costume images for Marilyn Monroe: the candy pink evening gown for the "Diamonds are a Girl's Best Friend" production number in Gentlemen Prefer Blondes (1953); and the white halter dress whose pleated skirt was blown up over a subway grate in The Seven Year Itch (1955), creating one of the most reproduced images in 20th-century popular culture. Edith Head continued a prolific career: she costumed Bette Davis in All About Eve (1950); Elizabeth Taylor's white gown in A Place in the Sun (1951) was widely copied for the debutante market; and her collaborations with Alfred Hitchcock produced two of the decade's most influential screen wardrobes—Grace Kelly's stylish interpretations of French couture in Rear Window (1954) and To Catch a Thief (1955), and Kim Novak's precisely tailored gray suit and black pumps in Vertigo (1958). Helen Rose's bridal designs made a lasting impact: Elizabeth Taylor's wedding gown in Father of the Bride (1950) was available in an officially licensed version; Grace Kelly's 1956 real-life wedding gown—a gift from MGM—was among the decade's most imitated dresses.

The female stars of the decade fell into two contrasting archetypes: the curvaceous and overtly sexual—Monroe, Taylor, Anita Ekberg, Sophia Loren, Gina Lollobrigida, Jayne Mansfield, and Brigitte Bardot, who presented a tousled "sex kitten" persona in And God Created Woman (1956)—and the lithe, gamine ideal embodied by Audrey Hepburn, whose willowy proportions contrasted the prevailing full-figured standard from her debut in Roman Holiday (1953). Doris Day personified the wholesome, perfectly turned-out American woman; Loretta Young was considered one of the best-dressed women on American television.

== Image galleries ==
=== Style gallery: Women's fashion 1950-1957 ===
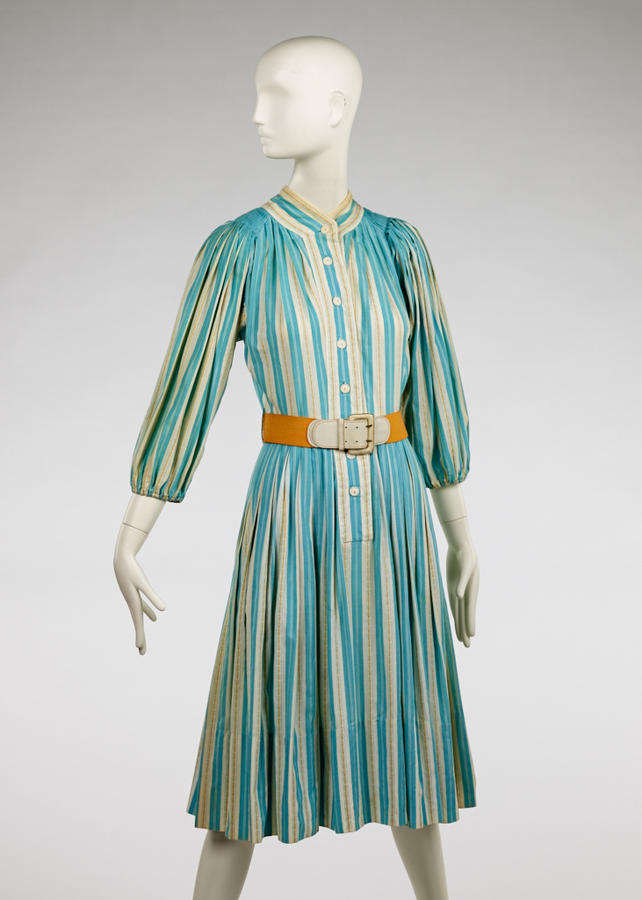
A cotton day dress by Claire McCardell, early 1950s

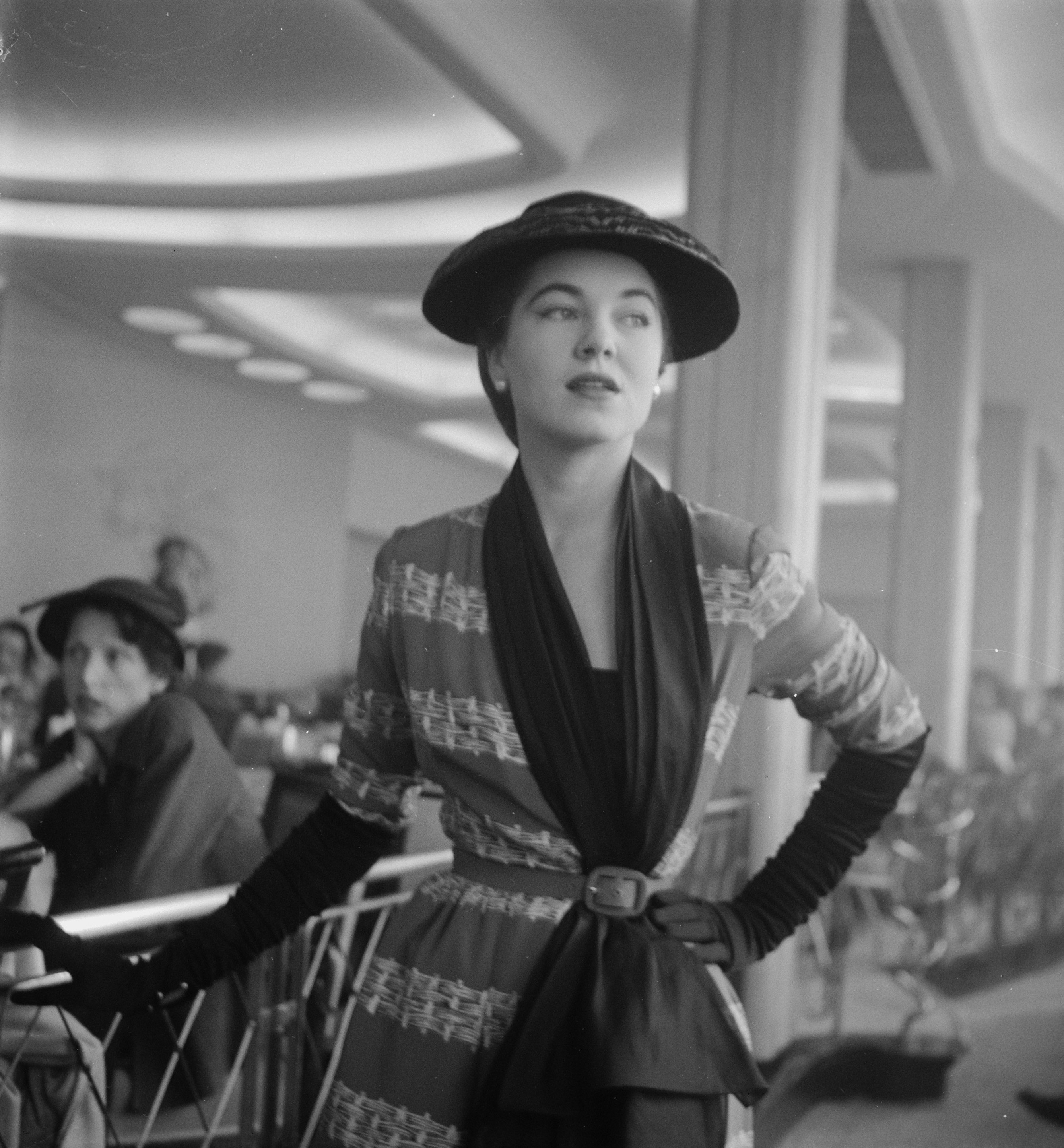
English model at a fashion show in Amsterdam Airport Schiphol, 1951.

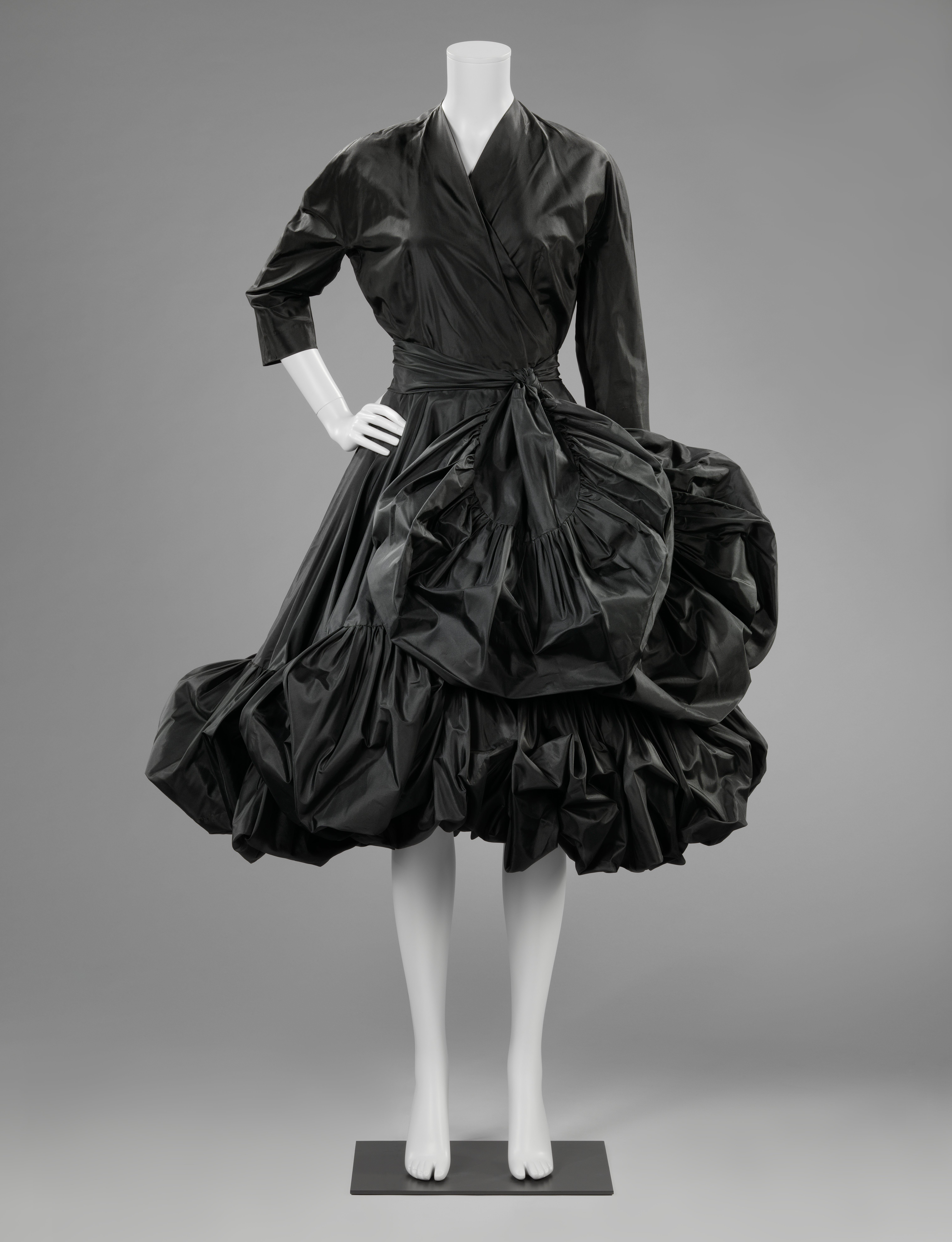
A reproduction of a black taffeta cocktail gown attributed to Cristóbal Balenciaga, 1951.

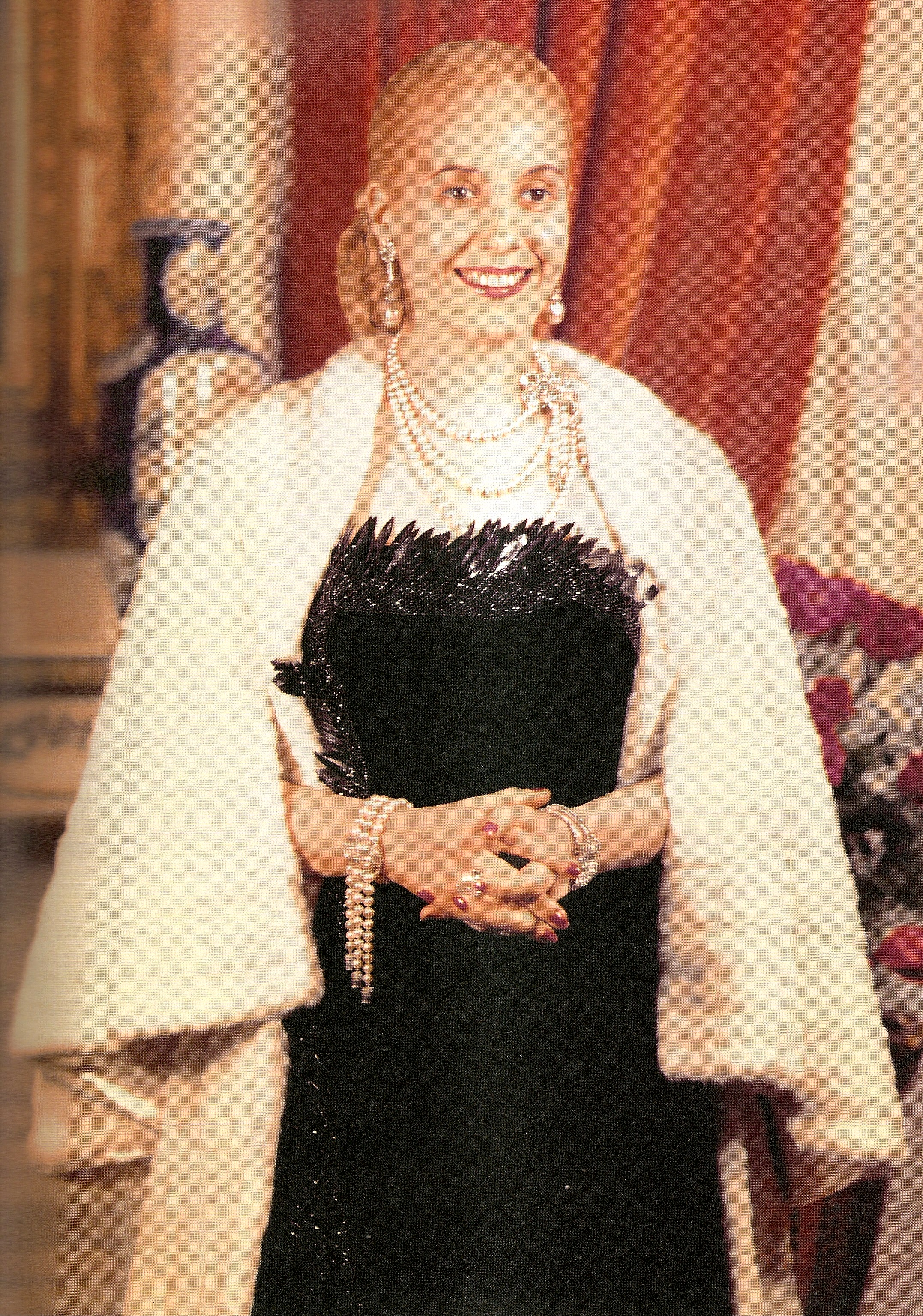
Eva Perón at the Teatro Colón in 1951, wearing a velvet and silk taffeta dress by Marcel Rochas.

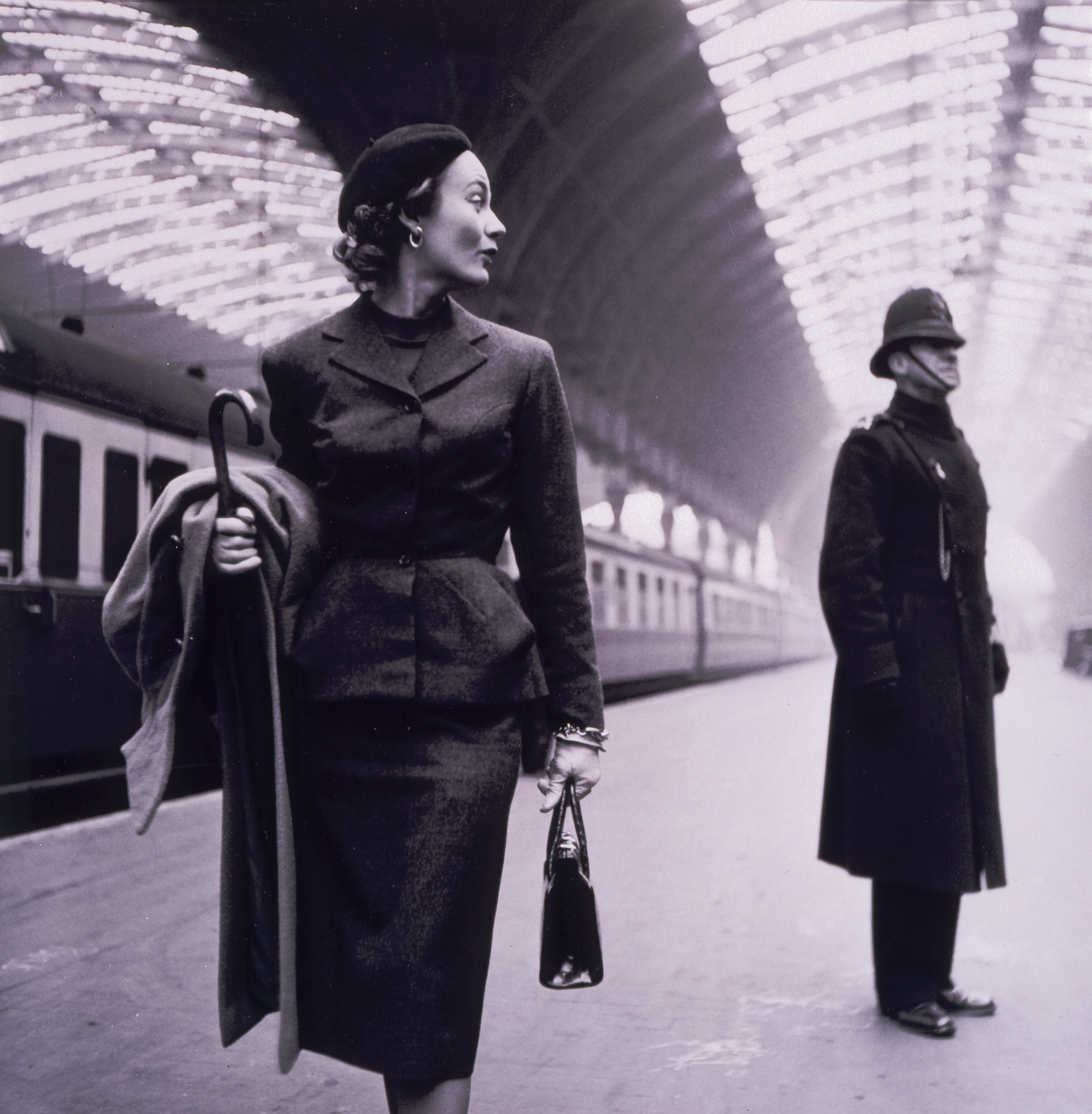
Model Lisa Fonssagrives photographed by Toni Frissell, 1951.

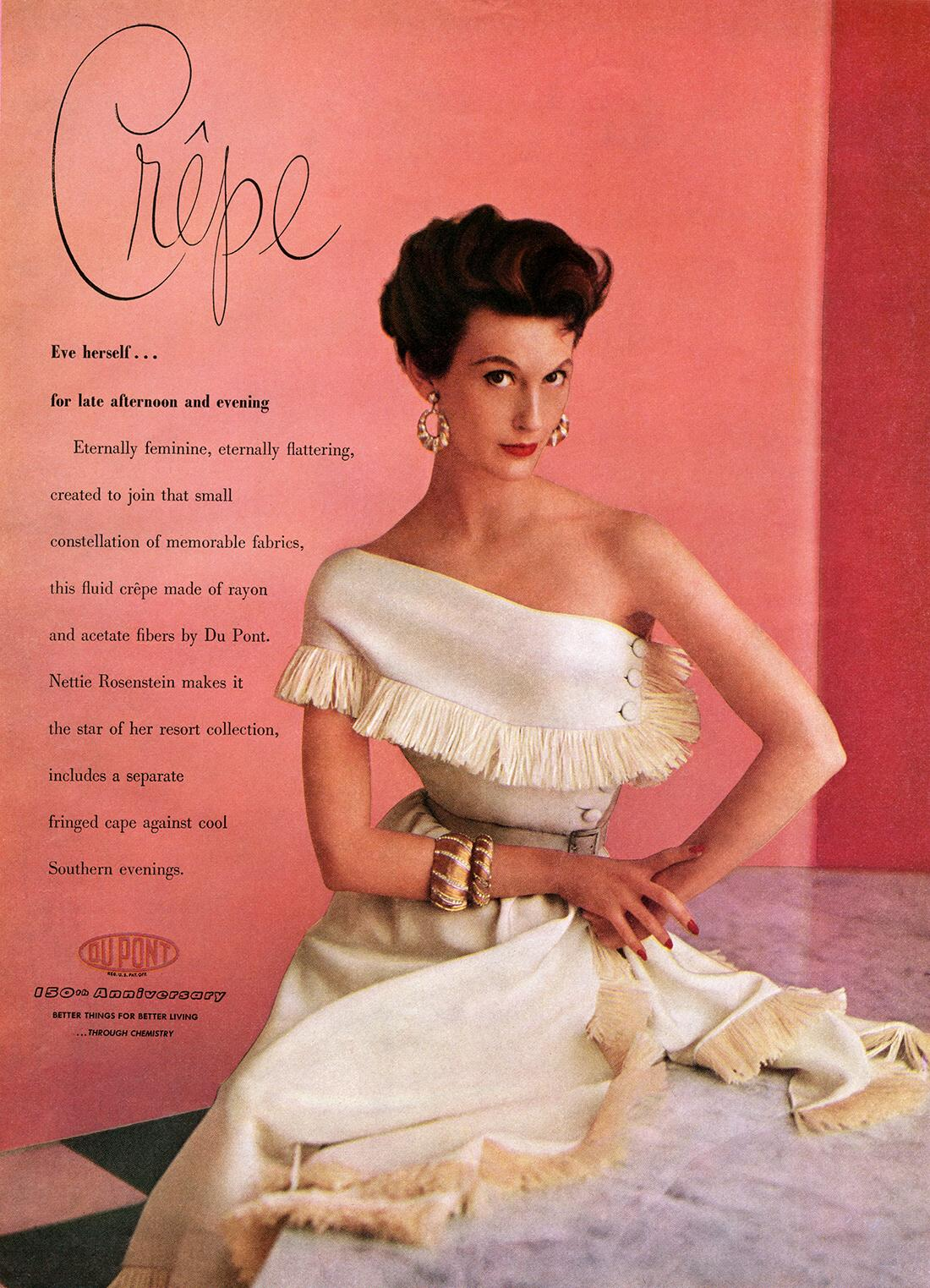
Mary Jane Russell wearing a dress by Nettie Rosenstein, 1952.

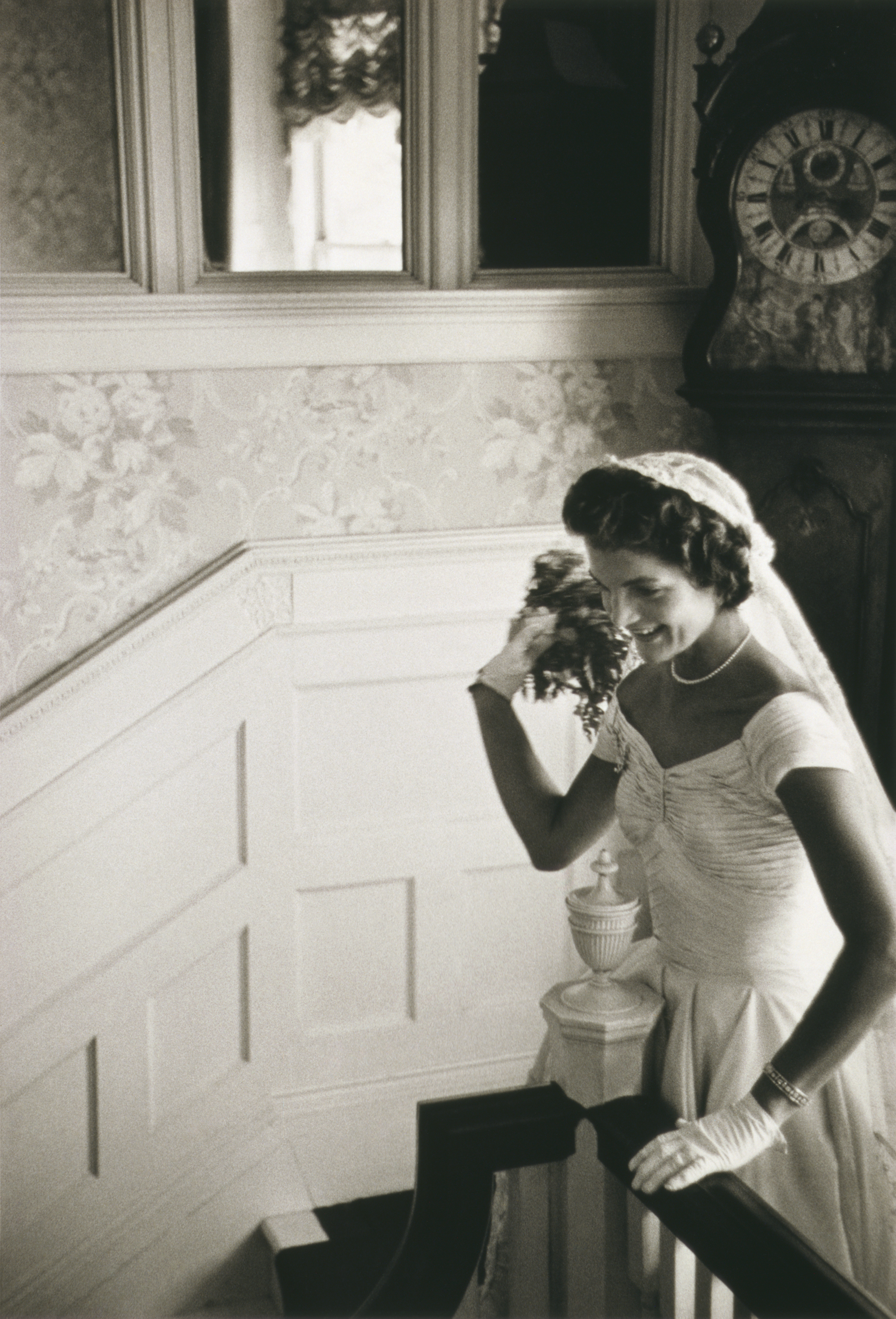
Jacqueline Kennedy at her wedding, wearing a dress by Ann Lowe, 1953.

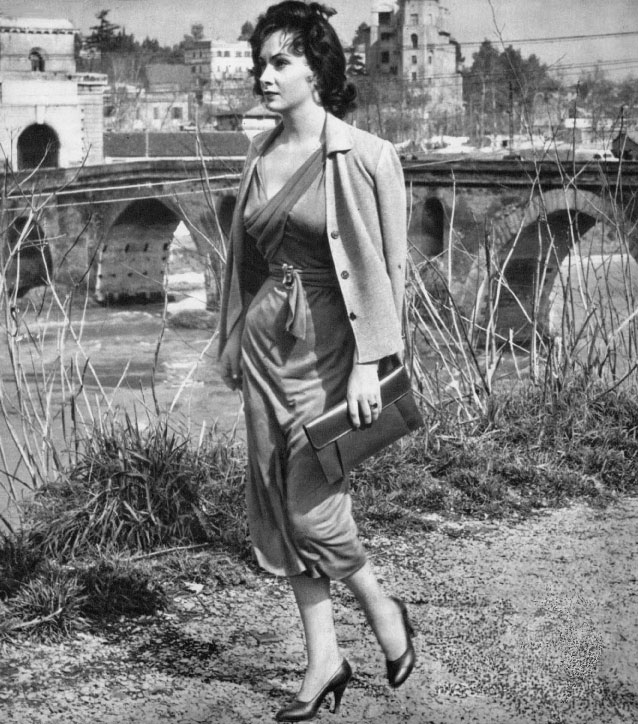
Gina Lollobrigida in Woman of Rome (1954).

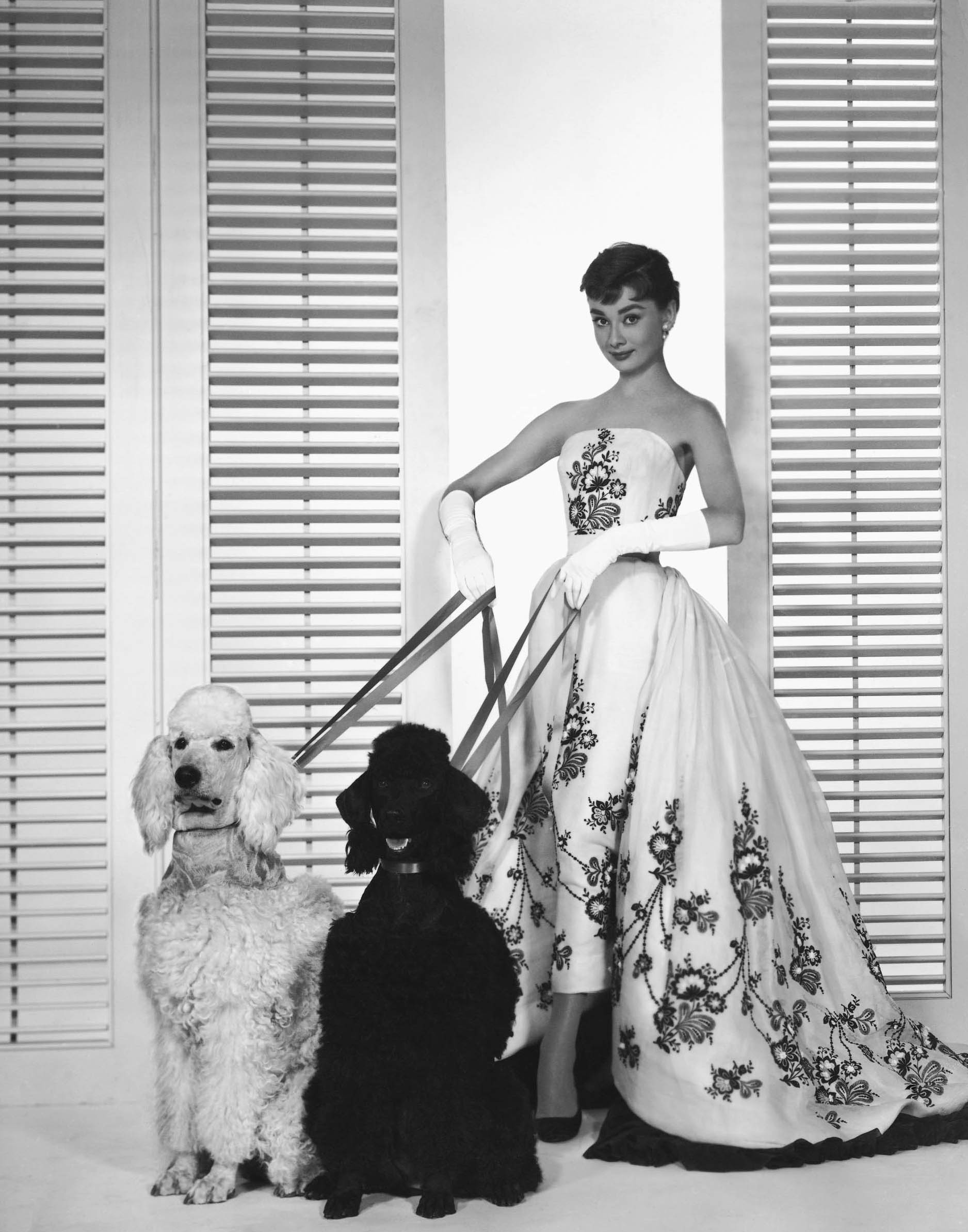
Audrey Hepburn in Sabrina (1954).

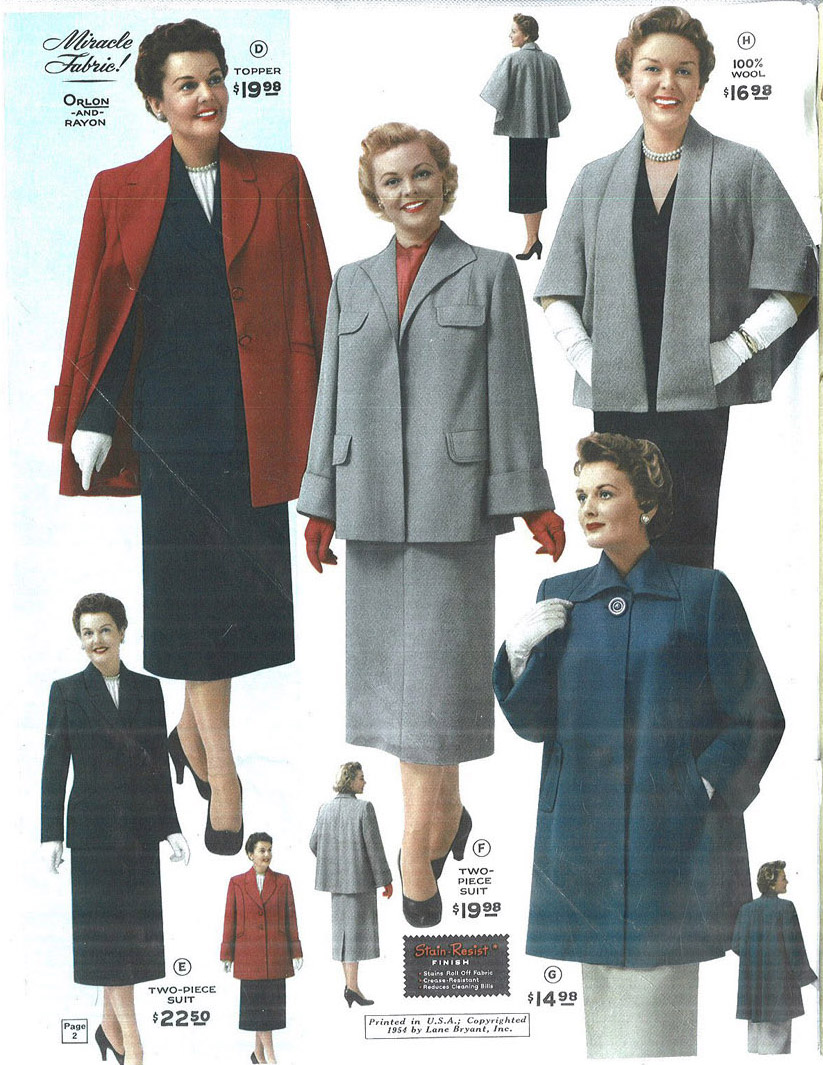
A page from the Lane Bryant Spring/Summer 1954 catalogue.

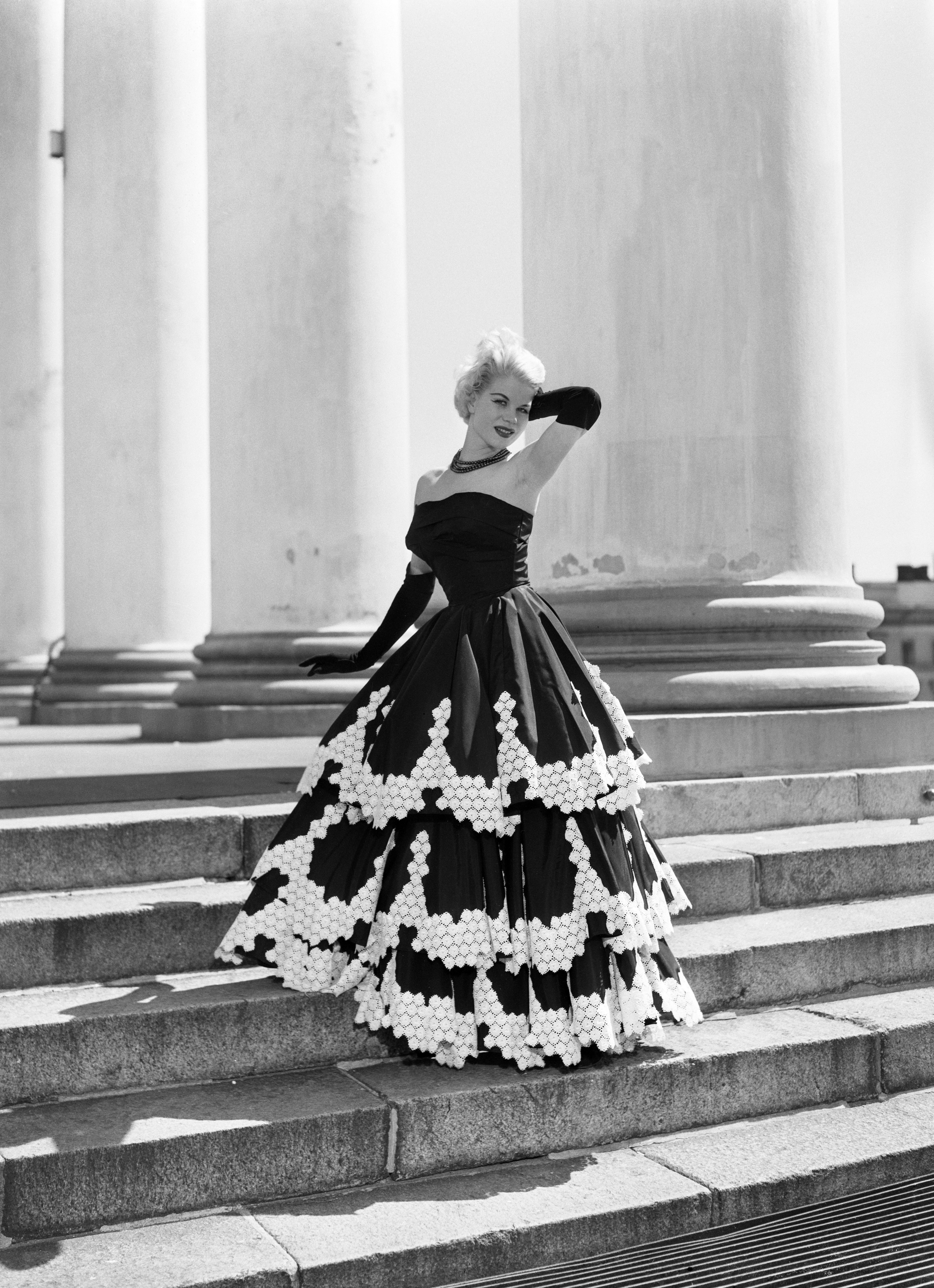
Finnish actress Lippe Hokkanen in Hunting for Miss Europe (1955).

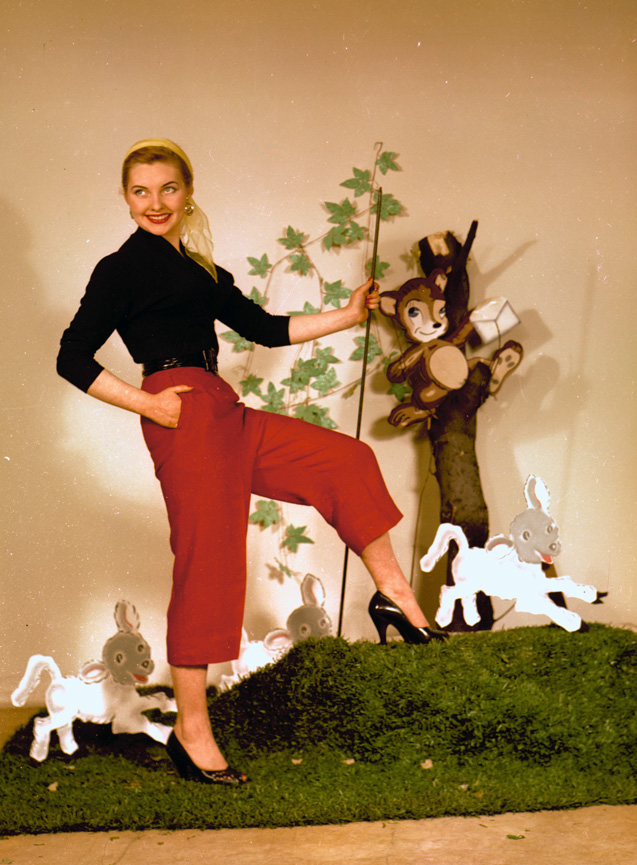
A Little Bo-Peep-themed fashion shoot in Newcastle upon Tyne, 1955.

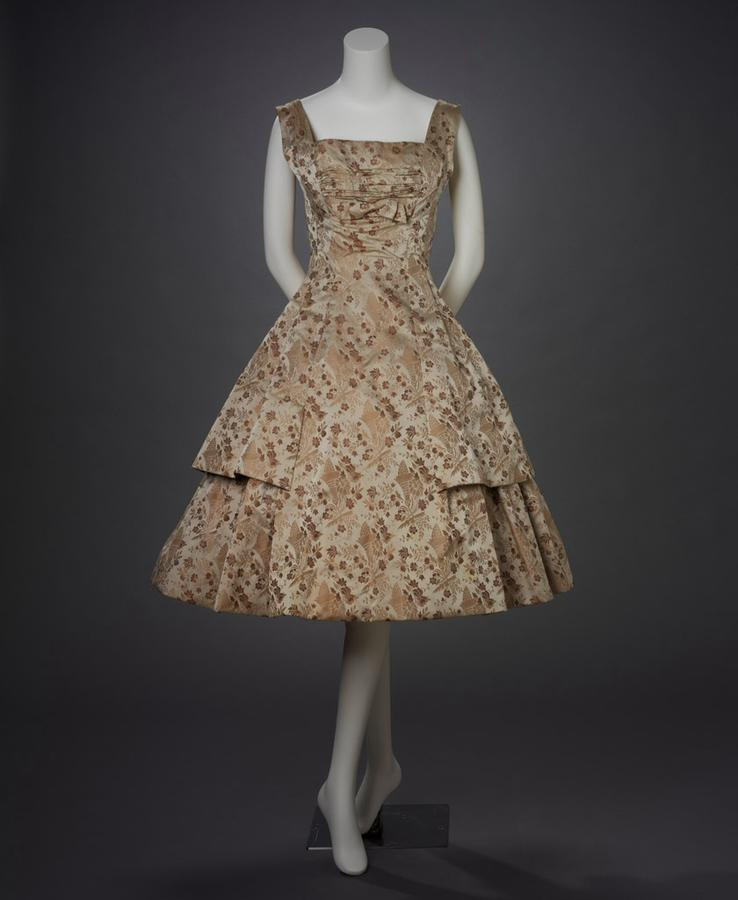
A cocktail dress in silk and acetate by Simonetta, 1955.

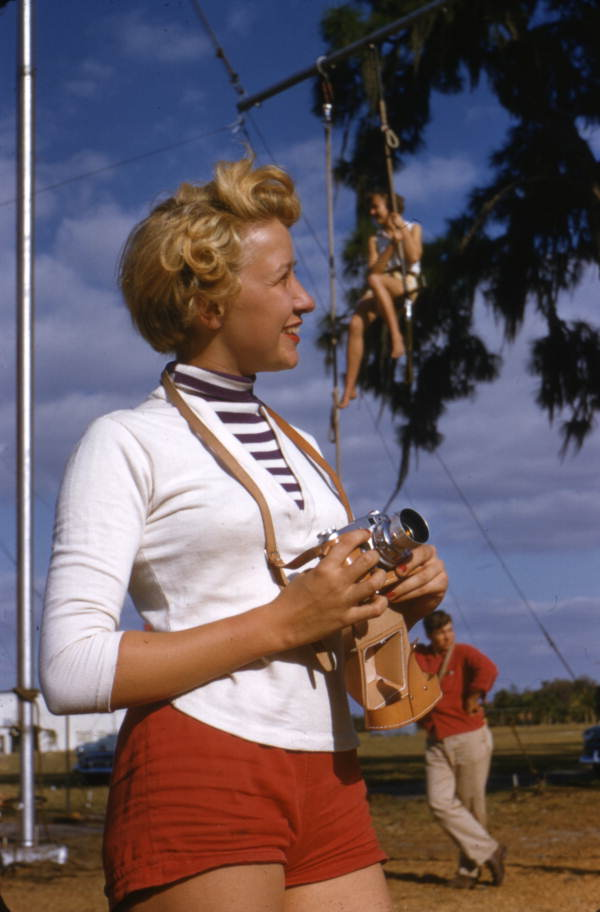
Summer fashion in Florida, 1955.

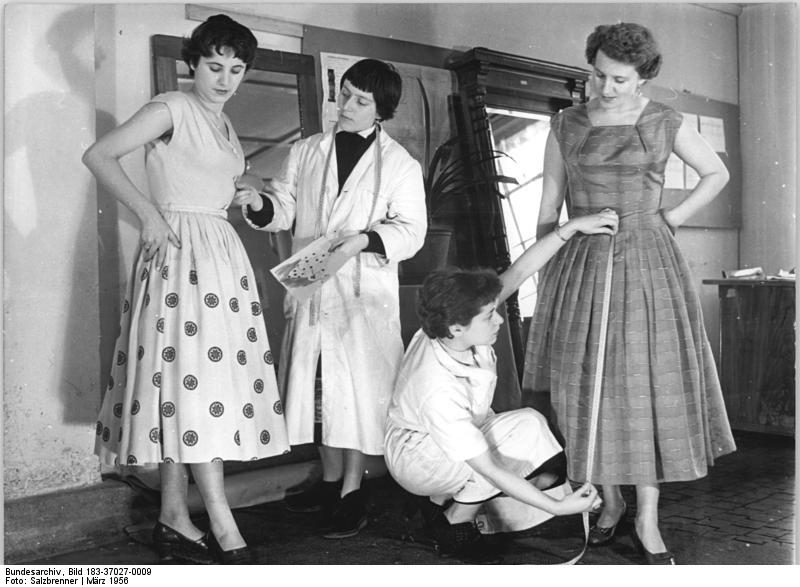
Women modelling new summer dresses at a clothing factory in Dresden, 1956.

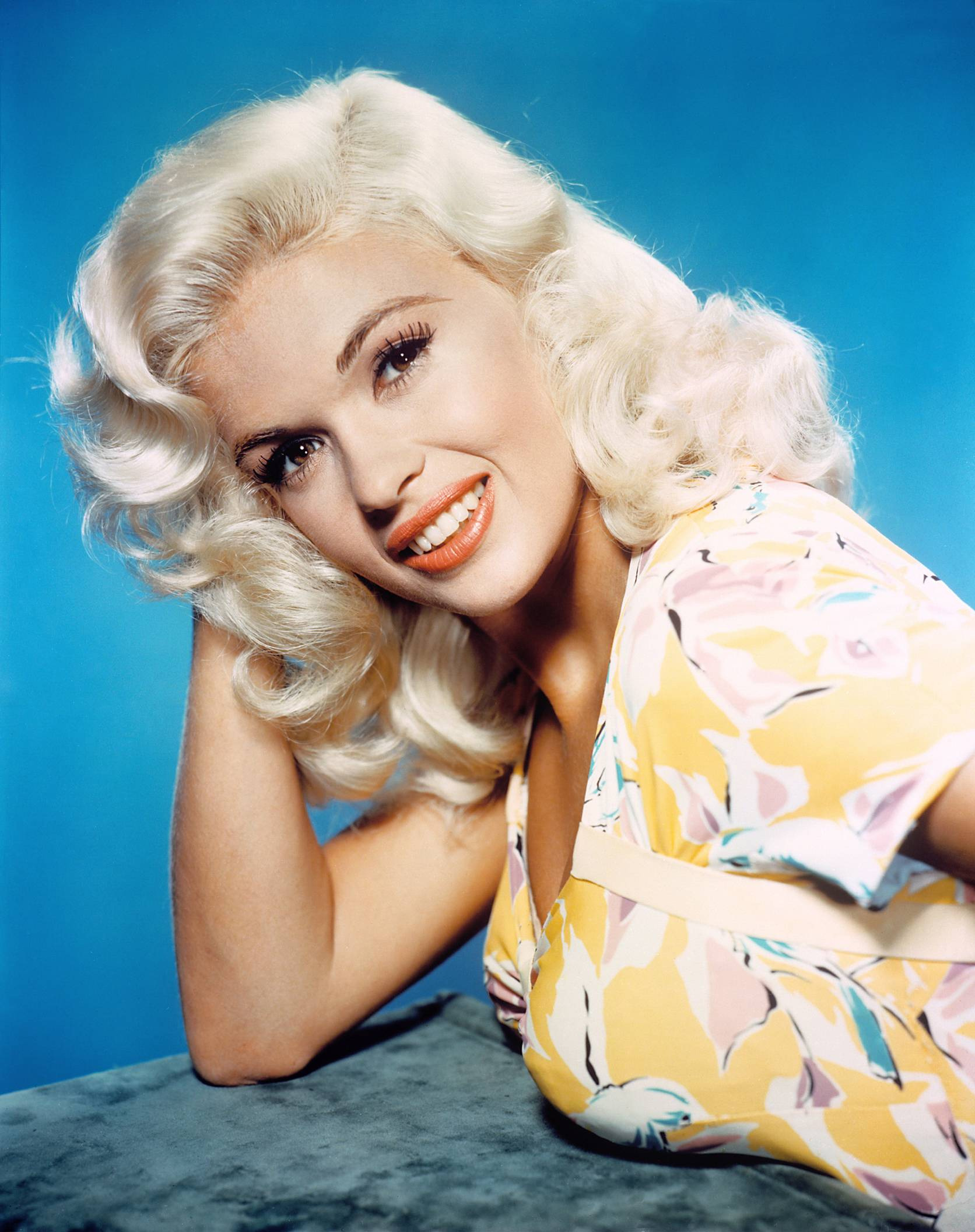
Jayne Mansfield in Kiss Them for Me (1957).

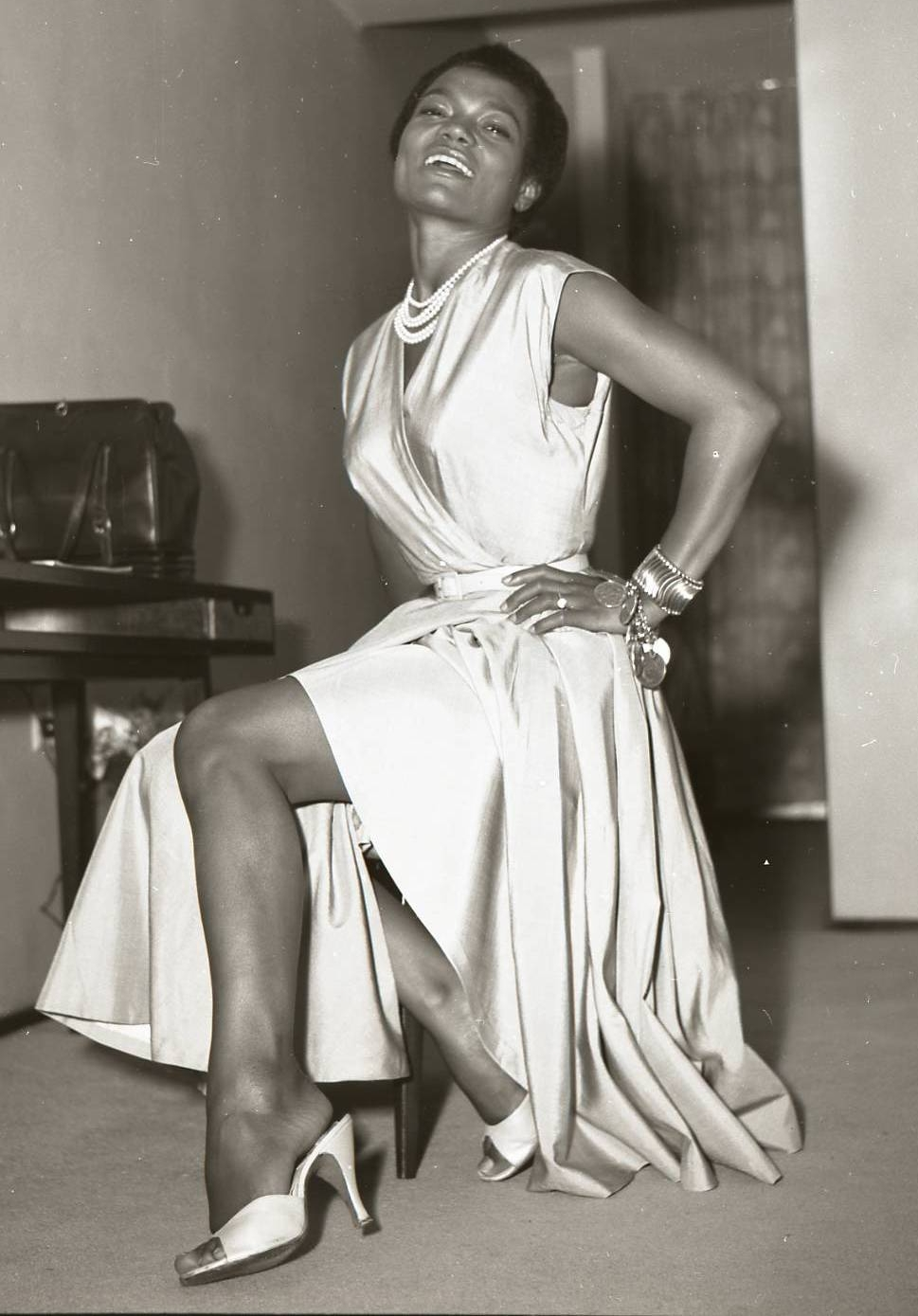
Eartha Kitt during a visit to Israel, 1957.

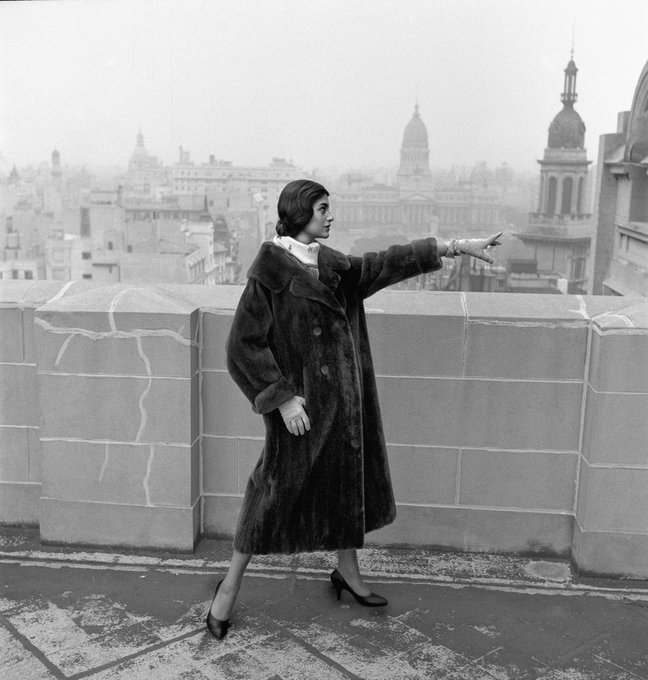
An Argentine fashion shoot in Buenos Aires, 1958.

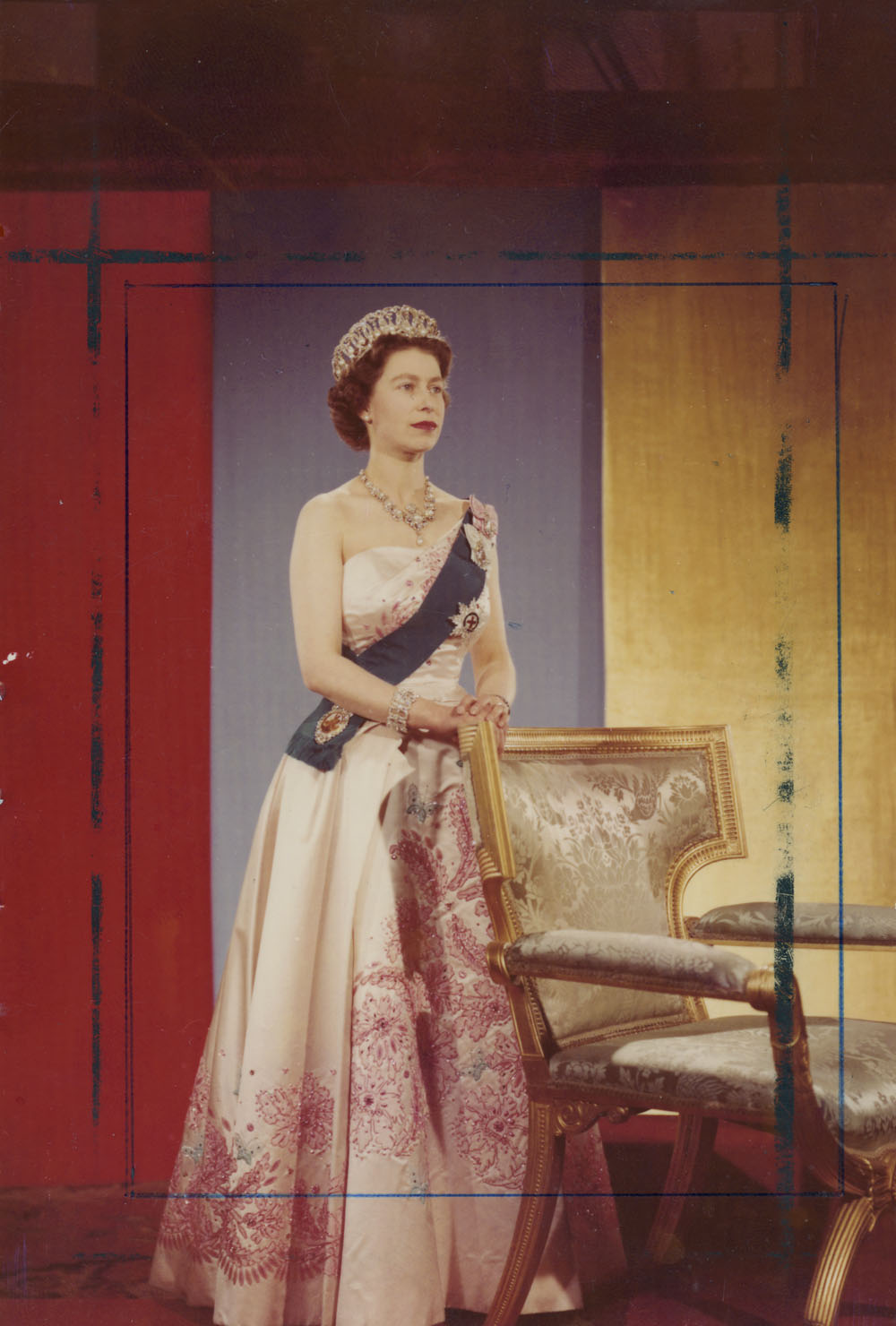
Elizabeth II posing for her official portrait in December 1958.

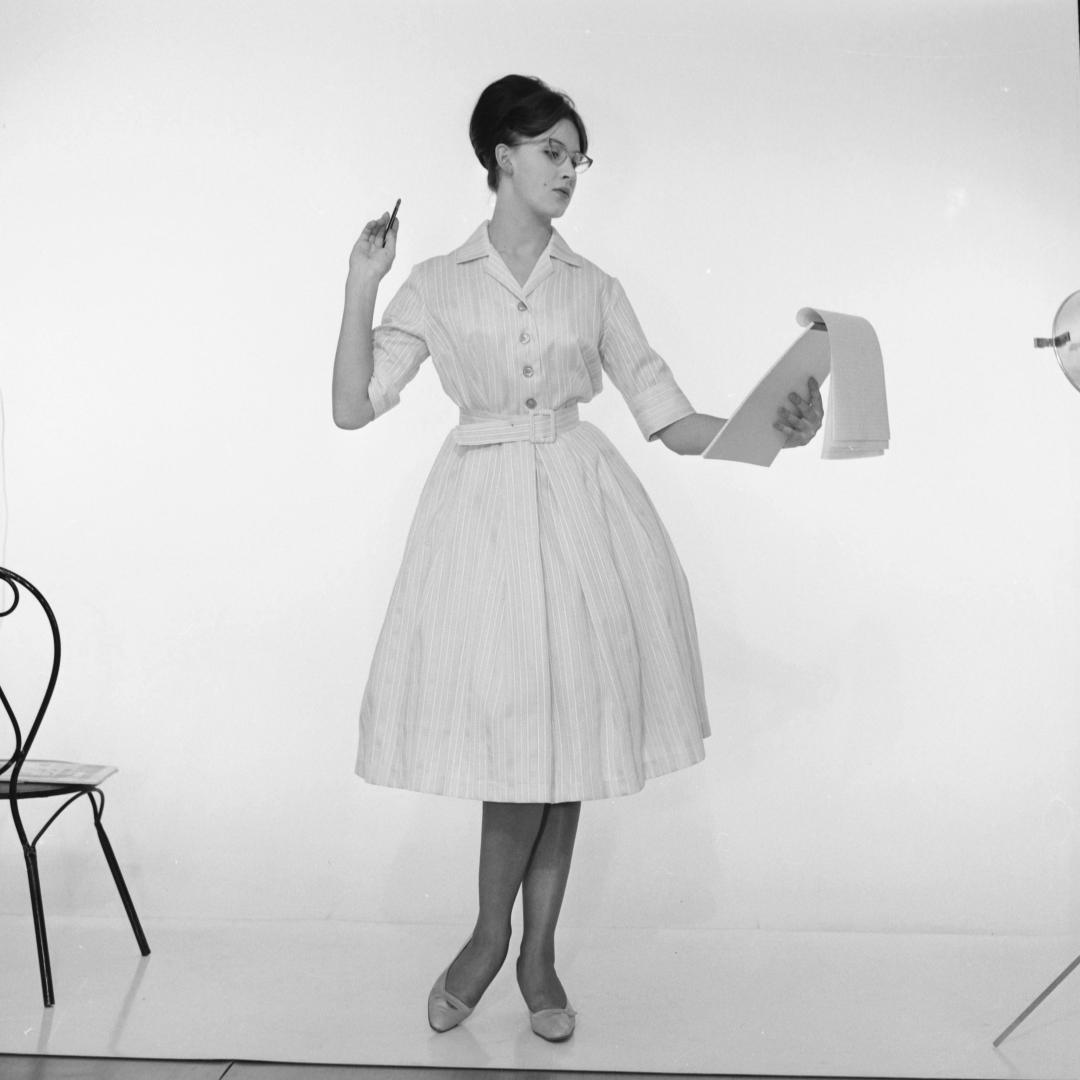
A Finnish fashion shoot in Lahti, 1959.

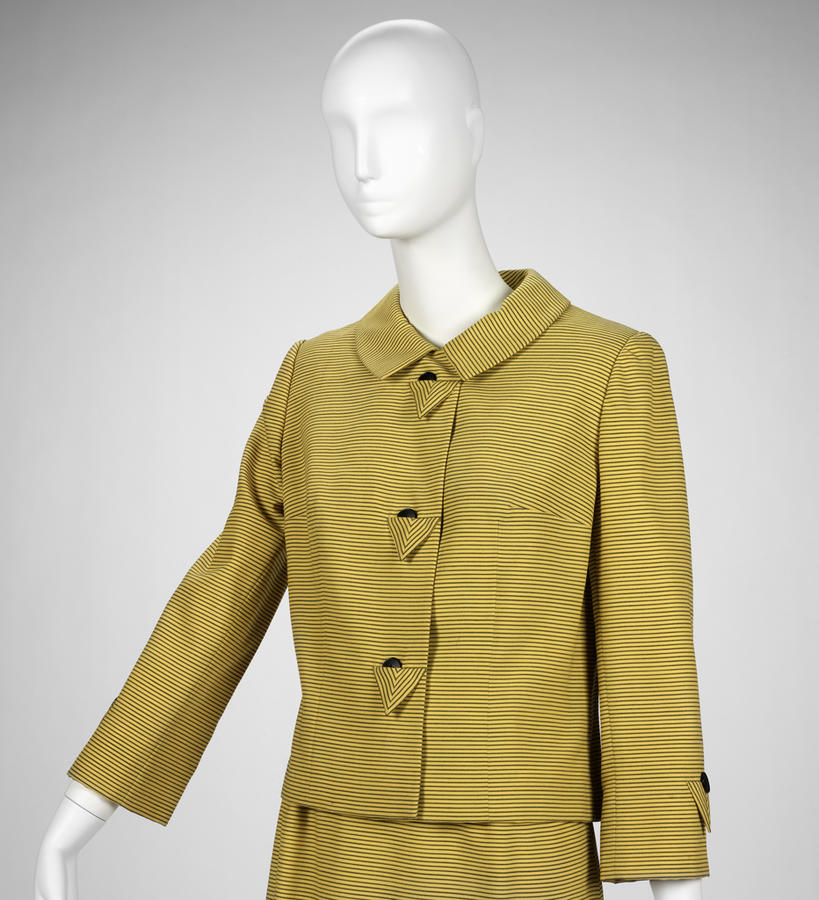
A skirt suit in striped wool and silk by Irene, 1959.

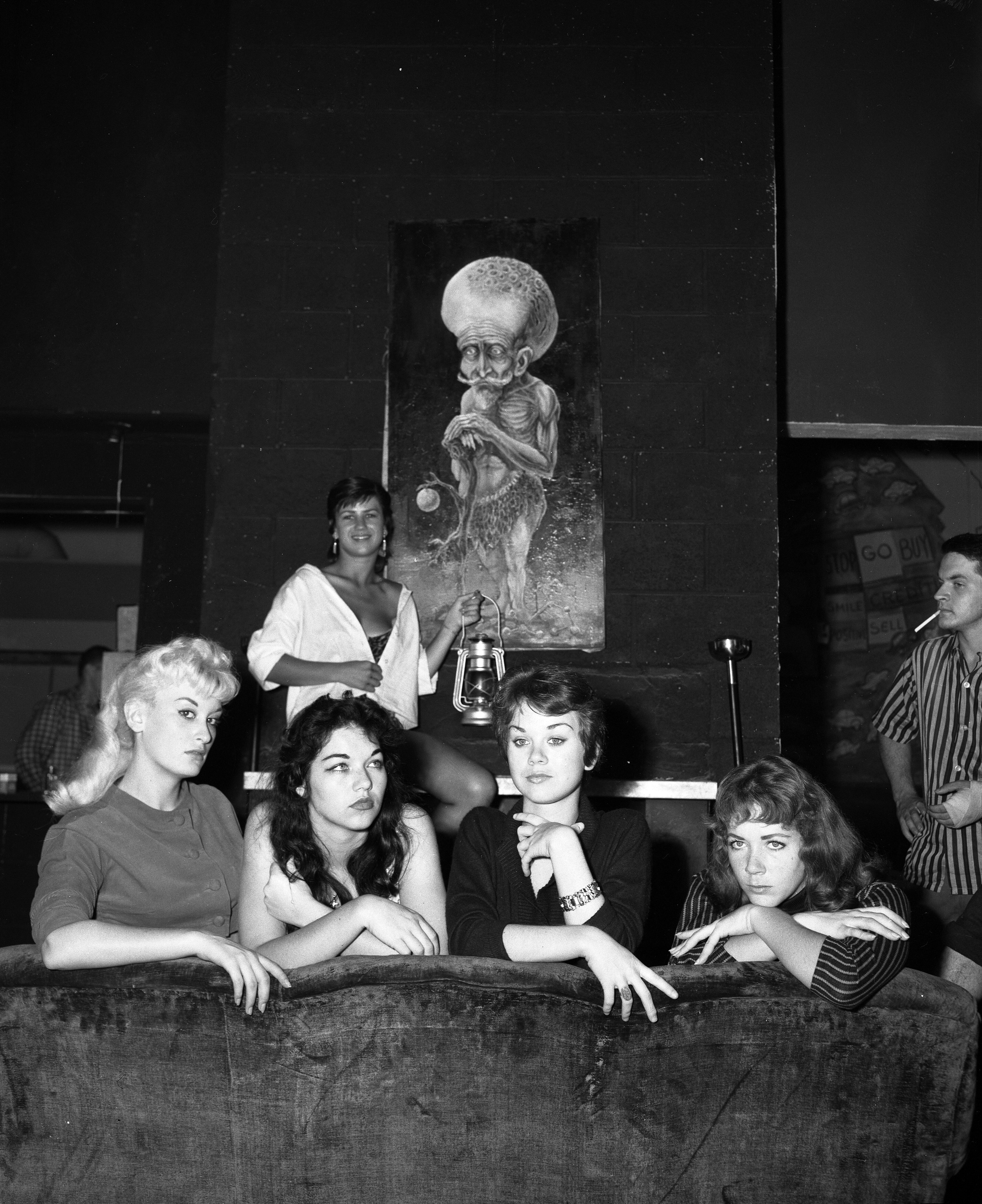
Contestans for the "Miss Beatnik" title in Los Angeles, 1959.

=== Style gallery: Men's fashion ===
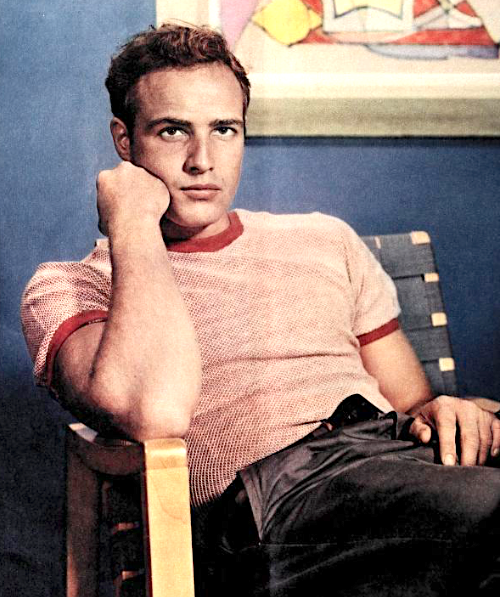
Marlon Brando in Photoplay magazine, 1950.

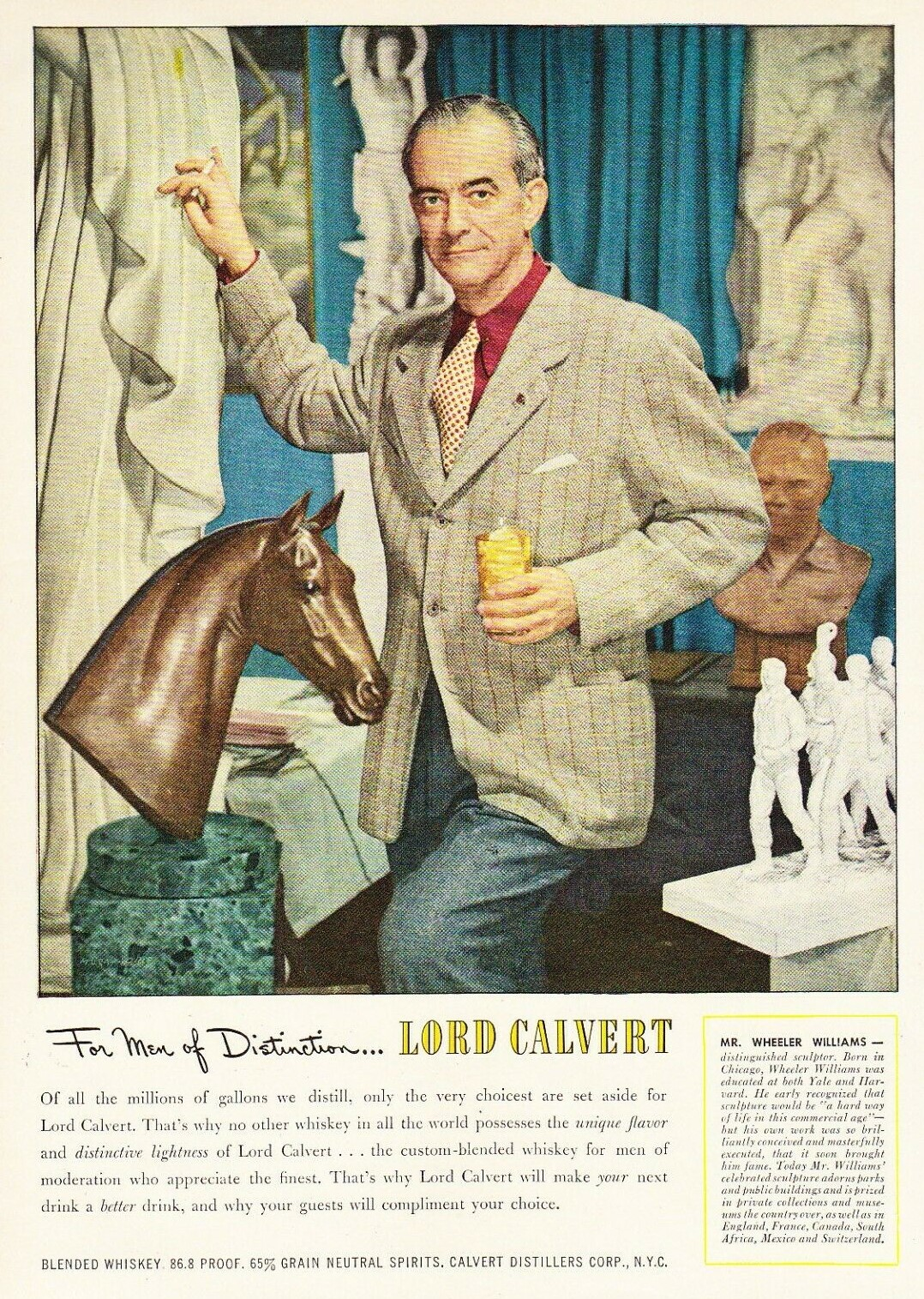
Wheeler Williams in a 1951 whiskey ad.

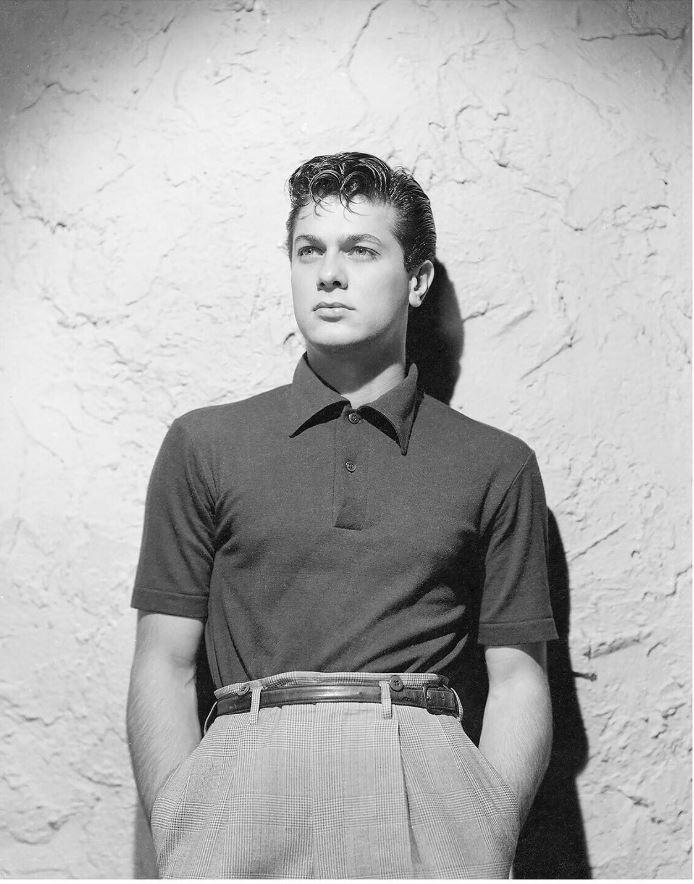
Tony Curtis in a publicity still, c. 1952.

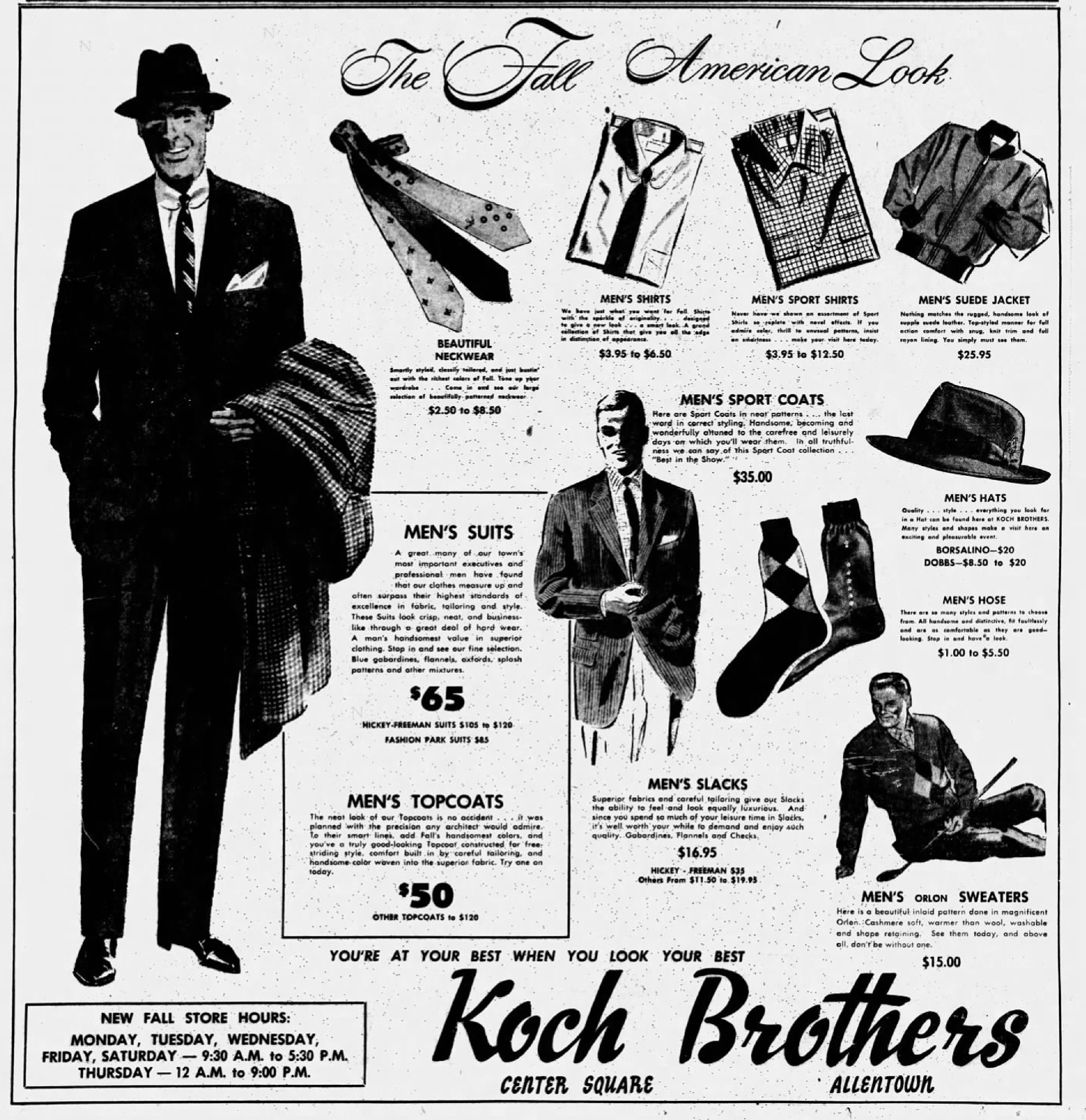
A newspaper ad for men's fashion in Allentown, Pennsylvania, 1953.

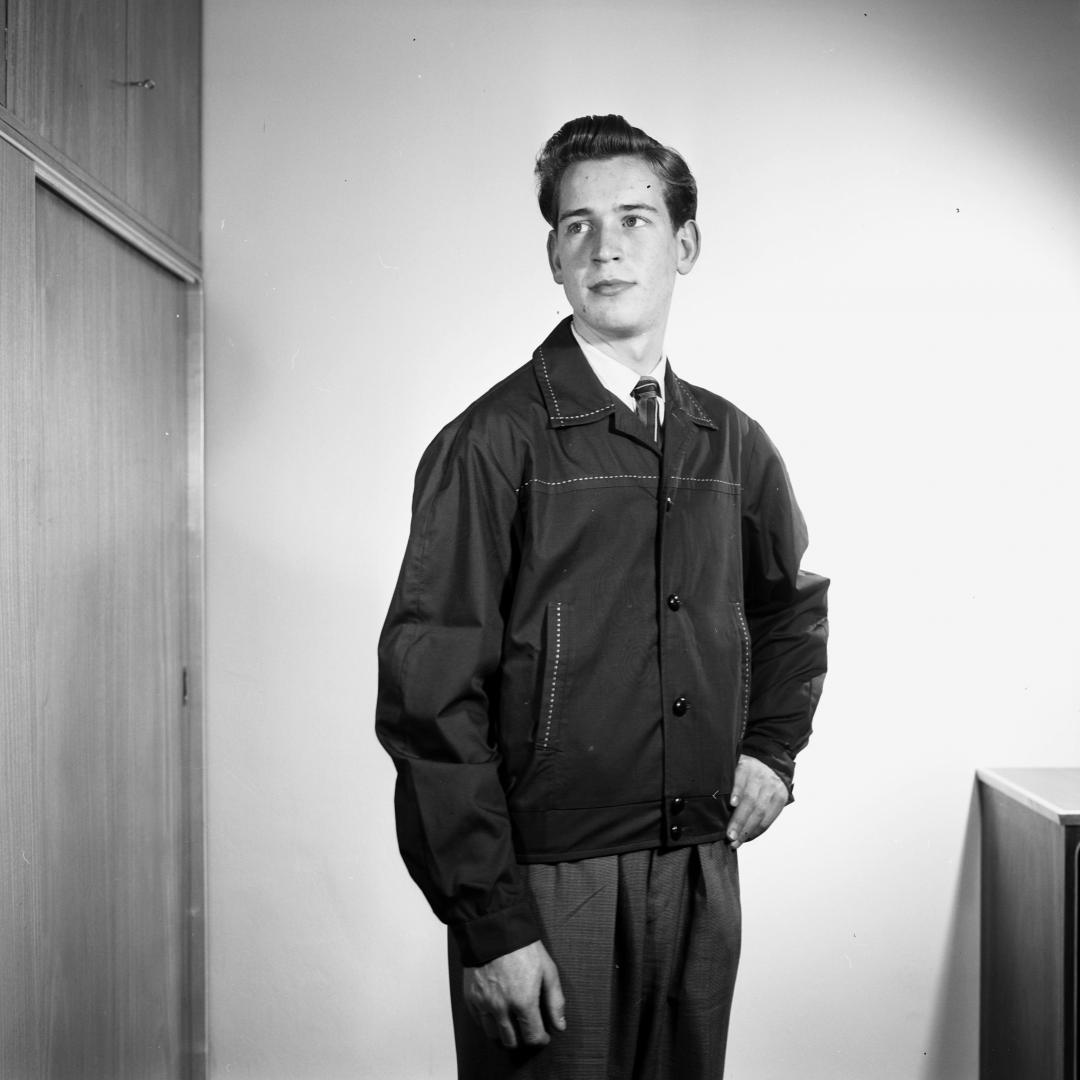
A Finnish menswear fashion shoot, 1956.

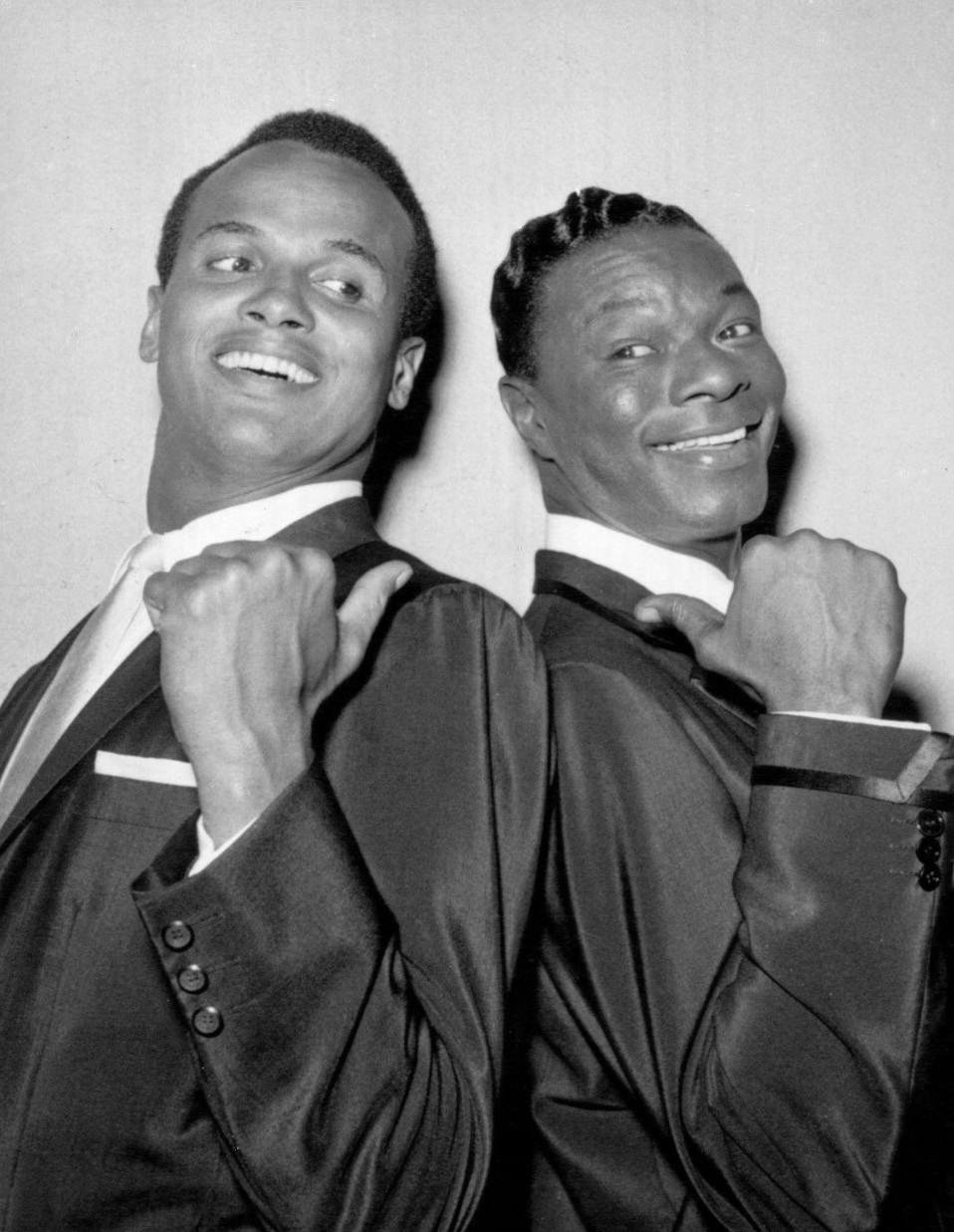
Harry Belafonte and Nat King Cole in 1957.

== Bibliography ==
- Cole, Daniel James; Deihl, Nancy (2015). The History of Modern Fashion. Laurence King Publishing. ISBN 9781780676036.
- Hennessy, Kathryn; Fischel, Anna, eds. (2012). Fashion: The Definitive History of Costume and Style. Smithsonian. DK. ISBN 9780756698355.
- Tortora, Phyllis G.; Marcketti, Sara B. (2015) [1989]. Survey of Historic Costume (6th ed.). Fairchild Books. ISBN 978-1-62892-167-0.
