= Color of clothing =

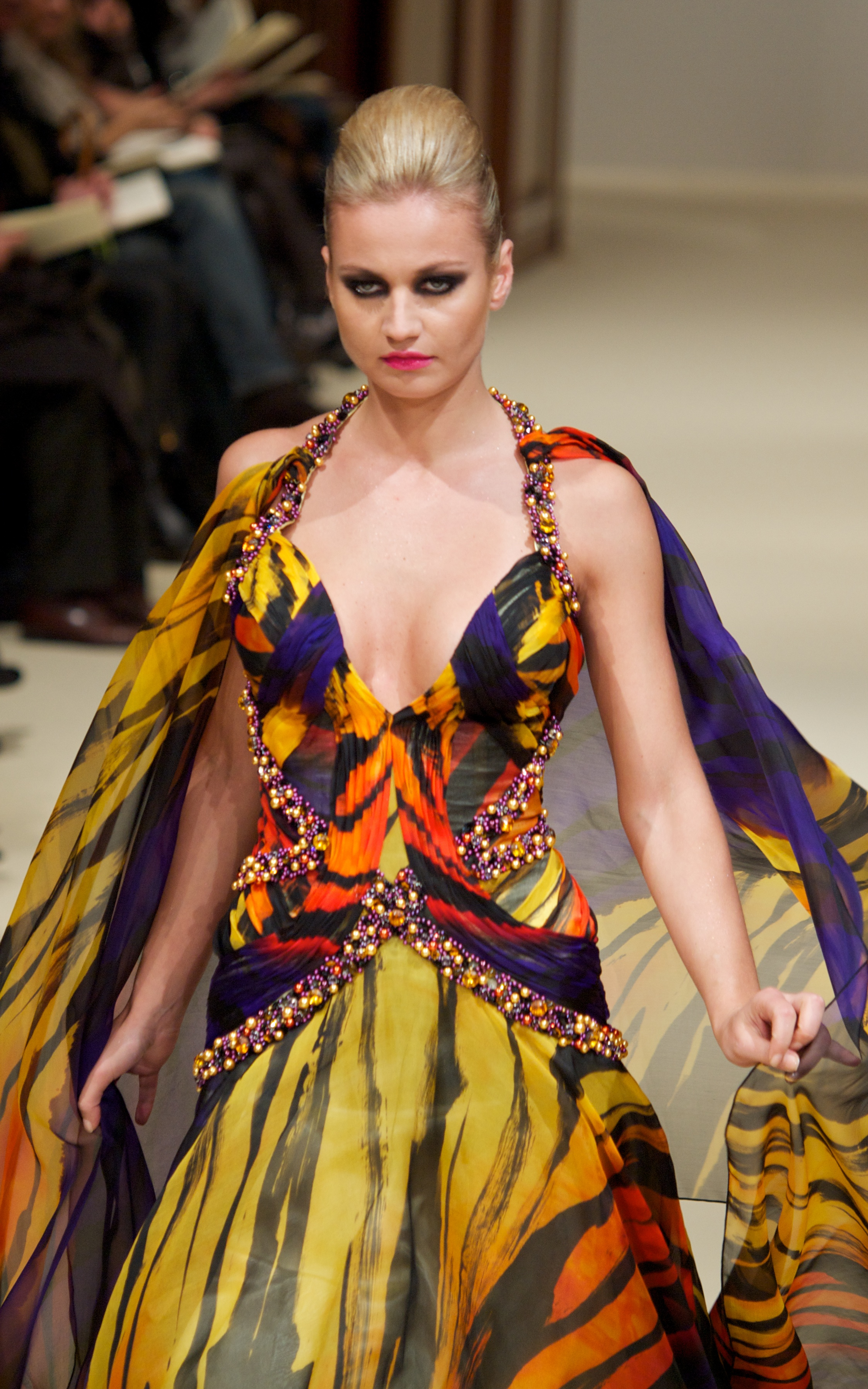
Model in a designer gown reflecting the current fashion trend at a Haute couture fashion show, Paris, 2011

The transformative power of clothes, the impact of changes in colors and style. A video on social expression through dress.

The color of clothing is an aesthetic element that significantly impacts appearance and influences how others perceive the wearer, including their socio-economic standing.

Historically, societies have regulated and assigned meaning to clothing colors. Sumptuary laws in medieval Europe restricted expensive dyes, like purple, to the nobility. During the Tudor period, crimson was reserved for higher chivalric ranks. Colors also carry social, cultural, and political significance. They are associated with gender stereotypes, mourning, and religious practices. Colors also identify political parties, sports teams, and professions, as seen in uniform colors or terms such as white-collar and blue-collar.

== Significance ==
Color is a visual characteristic that is further defined as an observable feature of an object. Often, it is the color of an object that attracts the most attention. The color of clothing is a primary property noticed by a consumer when purchasing clothes, since colors are distinctive and distinguishable.

=== Self-decoration ===
Self-decoration is a prevalent and fundamental characteristic of humans and the societal groups that we fit into. Decorative values of clothing are regarded as "primary if not the most primary." Color is an essential decorative element for meeting the necessary criterion of self-decoration.

=== Aesthetic comfort ===
Colors create aesthetic comfort when combined with fabric construction, the finish of the clothing material, garment fit, style, and fashion compatibility. These features all collectively contribute to a satisfying visual perception.

=== Symbolic representations ===
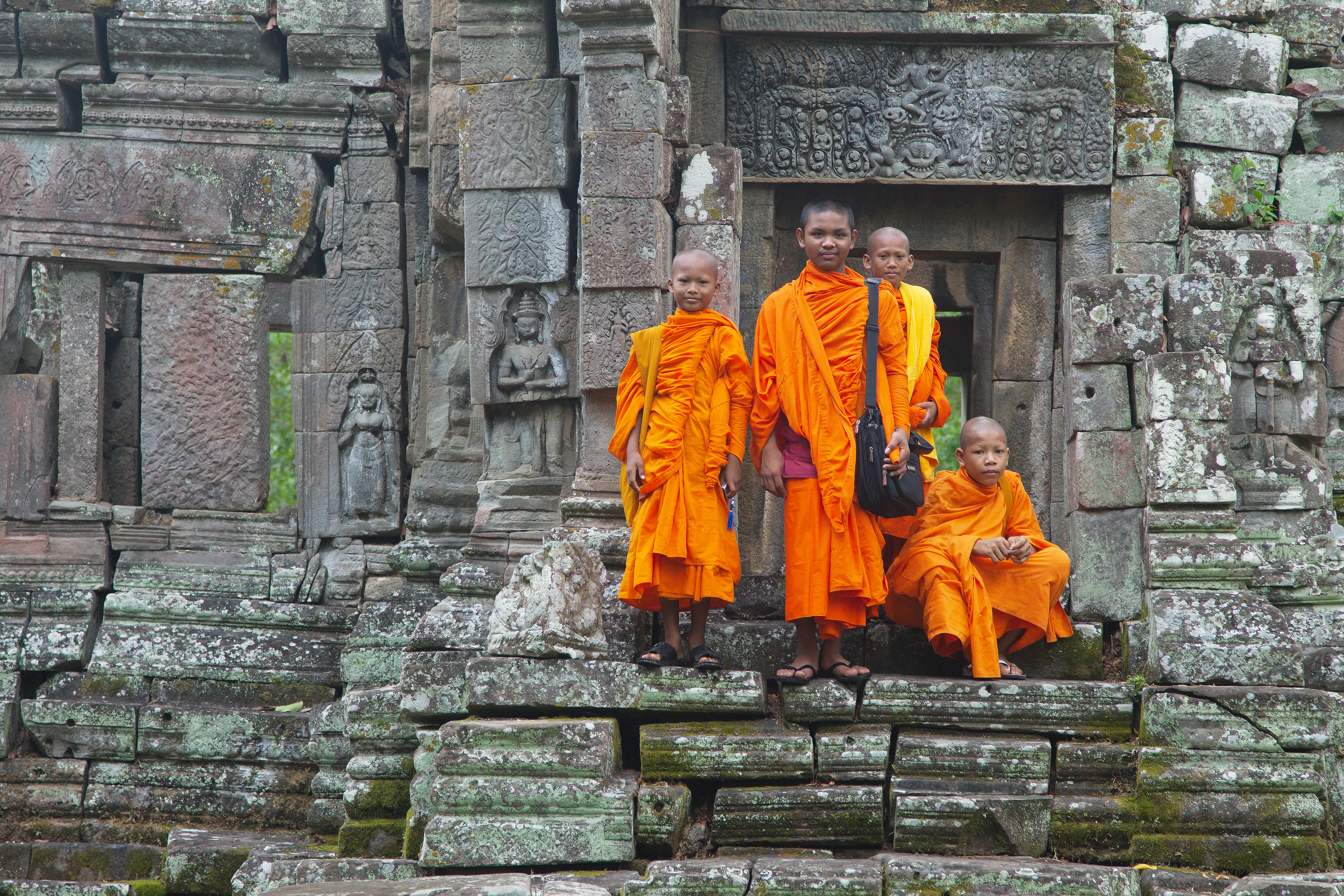
Preah Pithu T Monks - Siem Reap

Historically, different societies have set their own restrictions and norms for clothing. For example, during the Tudor period, wearing crimson was forbidden for ranks below the "Knights of the Garter." During the Renaissance era, clothing color became more significant when specific colors were reserved for the upper class and royalty. In medieval Europe, sumptuary laws were created that restricted the wearing of expensive colors—such as purple, which was obtained from seashells of the Mediterranean—to the nobility.

Colors of clothing have specific associations with certain types of clothing styles and symbolize cultural beliefs. Blue, for example, is closely associated with denim.

- The color saffron is considered sacred in Hinduism and Buddhism.
- Tekhelet, a blue or violet dye, is the holiest color in Judaism.
- The color green (Arabic: أخضر, romanized: 'akhḍar) has a number of traditional associations in Islam. In the Quran, it is associated with paradise.

=== Social significance ===
Colors have social, cultural, and political significance. In the past, some societies and cultures have adopted unconventional fashion trends, which have led to discrimination and/or controversy. The colors pink and blue are associated with gender stereotypes. Pink is seen to be a feminine color and blue is seen to be a masculine color. Clothing color stereotypes can also be seen across cultures. In Hinduism, for example, widows are required to wear white, while brides in Western cultures wear white wedding gowns. In Christianity, the color black is associated with mourning.

=== Identity ===
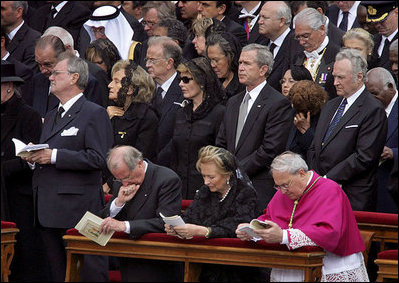
US President George W. Bush and Laura Bush attend funeral services on Friday, April 8, 2005, for the late Pope John Paul II in St. Peter's Square.

Clothing color represents the identity of political parties, sports teams, and various professions. The Bharatiya Janata Party uses the saffron color in its promotional activities. Cricket whites are a type of white clothing worn by cricket players. White coats are (sometimes stereotypically) smocks worn by professionals in the medical field or by those involved in laboratory work. There are various terms denoting groups of working individuals based on the colors of the collars worn at work. (See: Designation of workers by collar color)

- A white-collar worker is a person in a social class who performs intellectual labor.
- A blue-collar worker is a working-class person who performs manual labor.
- A pink-collar worker is someone working in a care-oriented career field or in fields historically and stereotypically considered to be women's work. This may include jobs in the beauty industry, nursing, social work, teaching, secretarial work, or child care.

=== Uniform ===
A uniform depicts the use of a similar color of clothing in a group, organization, or profession.

==== School uniform ====
A school uniform is a standardized outfit worn by students of an educational institution.

==== Military uniform ====
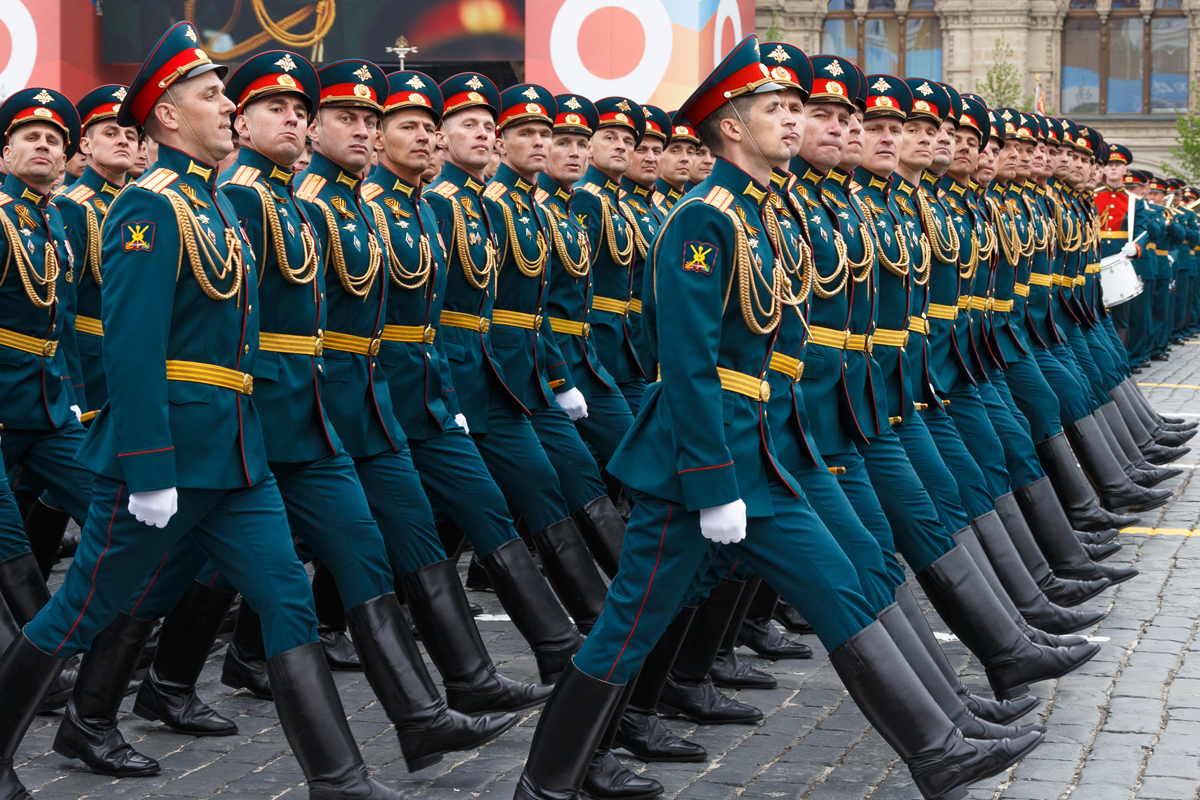
Russian Ground Forces officers during the 2019 Moscow Victory Day Parade in full dress uniforms

Standardized dress worn by military personnel and paramilitary groups of various nations.

==== Political uniform ====
A political uniform is distinctive clothing worn by members of a political movement.

==== Sportswear ====
Standardized sportswear may also function as a uniform for sports teams. In team sports, opposing teams are usually identified by their clothing colors, while individual team members can be identified by the numbers on the backs of their shirts.

=== List of notable garments by color name ===
- White tie
- Little black dress
- Pink Chanel suit of Jacqueline Kennedy
- Black Givenchy dress of Audrey Hepburn
- White dress of Marilyn Monroe
- Pink dress of Marilyn Monroe
- Black dress of Rita Hayworth

== Fashion ==
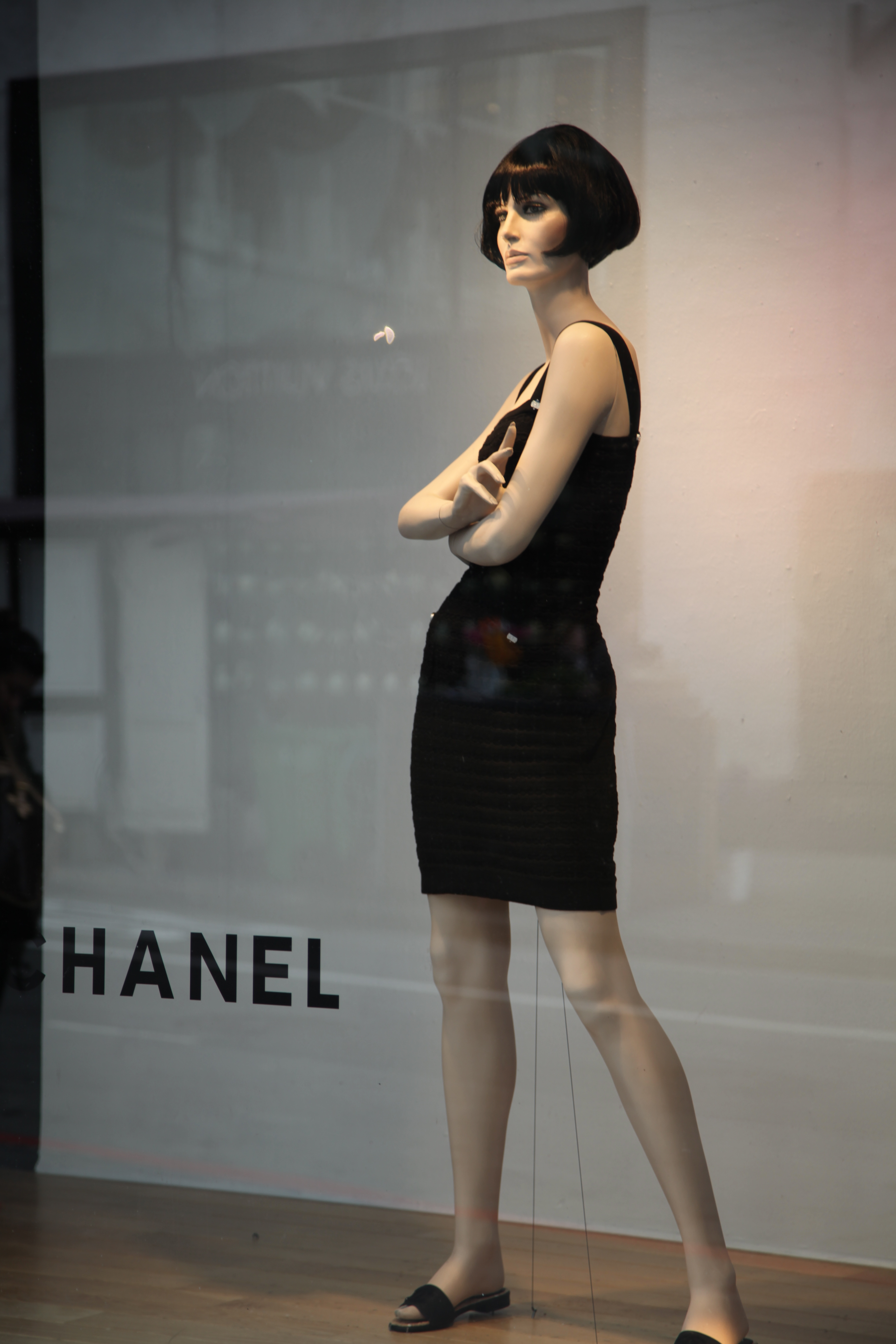
Chanel's "little black dress"

The color of clothing is a key factor in capturing people's attention and persuading them to purchase a product.

=== Quotes ===
To me, clothing is a form of self-expression. There are hints about who you are in what you wear.

— Marc Jacobs

The best color in the whole world, is the one that looks good, on you.

— Coco Chanel

== Psychology ==
Psychologists believe that the color of our clothing influences our stress levels and moods. Color enhances a person's experience of their surroundings.

== Literature ==
The color saffron is associated with the goddess of dawn (Eos in Greek mythology and Aurora in Roman mythology) in classical literature:

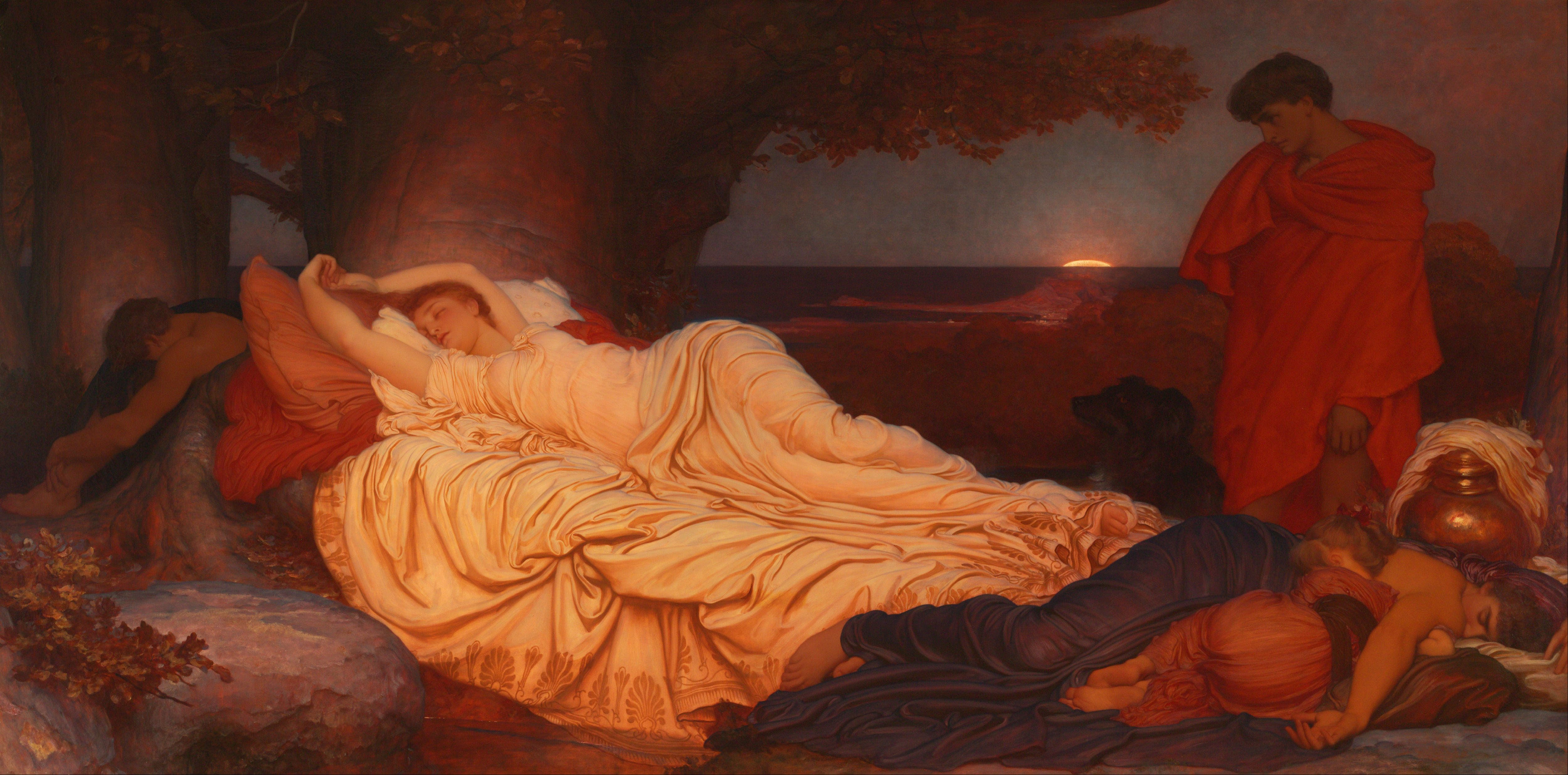
Cymon and Iphigeneia c. 1884 by Frederic Leighton - saffron suffuses the canvas at sunrise

Homer's Iliad:

Now when Dawn in robe of saffron was hastening from the streams of Okeanos, to bring light to mortals and immortals, Thetis reached the ships with the armor that the god had given her. (19.1)

Virgil's Aeneid:

Aurora now had left her saffron bed,

And beams of early light the heav'ns o'erspread,

When, from a tow'r, the queen, with wakeful eyes,

Saw day point upward from the rosy skies.

== Value addition ==
Greige goods have limited shades ranging from off-white to white, and colors add value to these products. Applying color to clothing involves many textile arts such as dyeing, printing, and painting. Royal blue dye is one of the costliest hues to obtain. Different colors have different costs because of longer or shorter dye cycles.

== Application ==
Colors can be applied to textiles in a variety of ways, but the most common methods are dyeing and printing. Dyeing is a uniform color application, and printing is when color is applied in certain patterns.

=== Seasons and colors ===
Retailers and buyers design merchandise according to the seasonal forecast. Primarily, clothing falls into four seasons: spring, summer, autumn and winter. Some fast fashion brands, like Zara, have more than four seasonal changes on their shelves.

There are professional organizations that forecast colors, such as the Color Marketing Group, Color Association of the United States, and International Colour Authority.

==== Color matching systems ====
Pantone is a standardized color reproduction system that conveys colors through color matching systems. These standards can be used by manufacturers all over the world to create uniform colors.

===== Production =====
Textile dyeing mills use color standards in physical and digital forms for the reproduction of their colors. Physical color standards are cut pieces of reference colors, whereas digital color standards are known as "QTX files" (spectral data) and are considered a more efficient method.

When working with color matching and quality control software, textile manufacturers import a QTX file. With digital color standards, a QTX file is simply a text file containing reflectance measurements for the color in question.

===== Measurement (Delta-E) =====
Color is a subjective visual perception that varies between individuals. There are spectrophotometers that can objectively compare spectral values and colors. Although colors are viewed visually and digitally, both depend on the customer's requirements. Delta E (dE-CMC) expresses the difference between the original standard and the reproduction.

=== Alternative technologies for color application ===
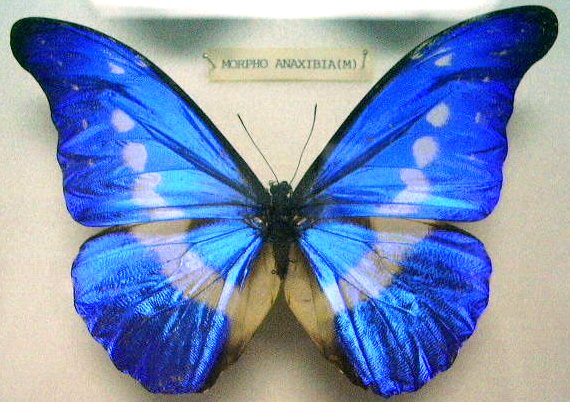
In Morpho butterflies such as Morpho helena the brilliant colors are produced by intricate frilly-shaped microstructures too small for optical microscopes.

==== Structural coloration ====
Microstructures that interfere with light cause structural coloration. Some examples of structural coloration include bird feathers and butterfly wings (see:Iridescence).

Nanocoating—specifically of microscopically structured surfaces fine enough to interfere with visible light—in textiles for biomimetics is a new method of structural coloration without dyes. In structural coloration, interference effects are used to create colors instead of using pigments or dyes.

== Gallery ==
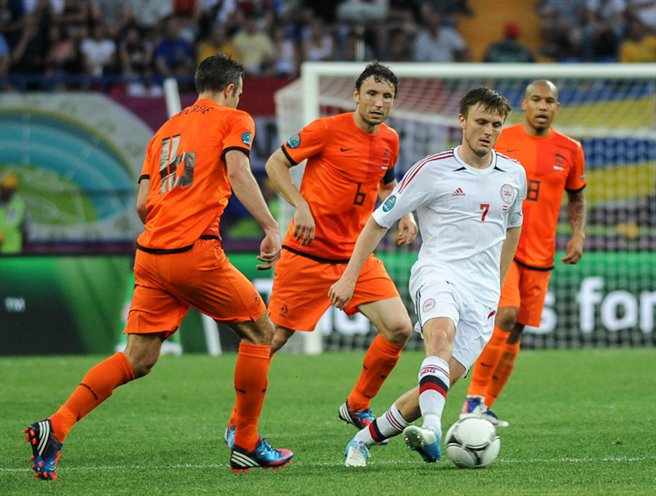
UEFA Euro 2012 match between the Netherlands and Denmark. Two teams in different-colored uniforms.

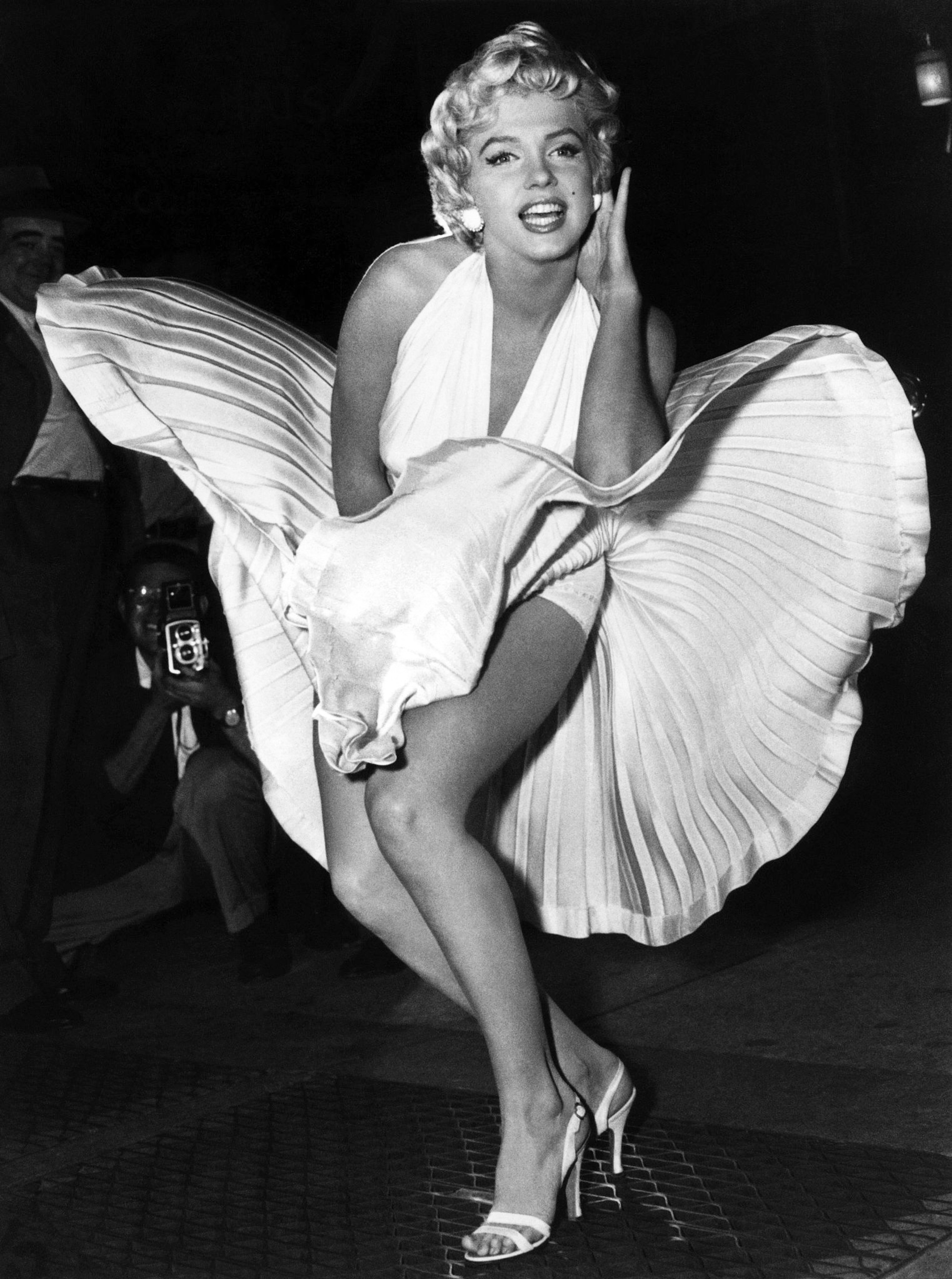
White dress of Marilyn Monroe: Monroe posing while filming The Seven Year Itch on the streets of New York.

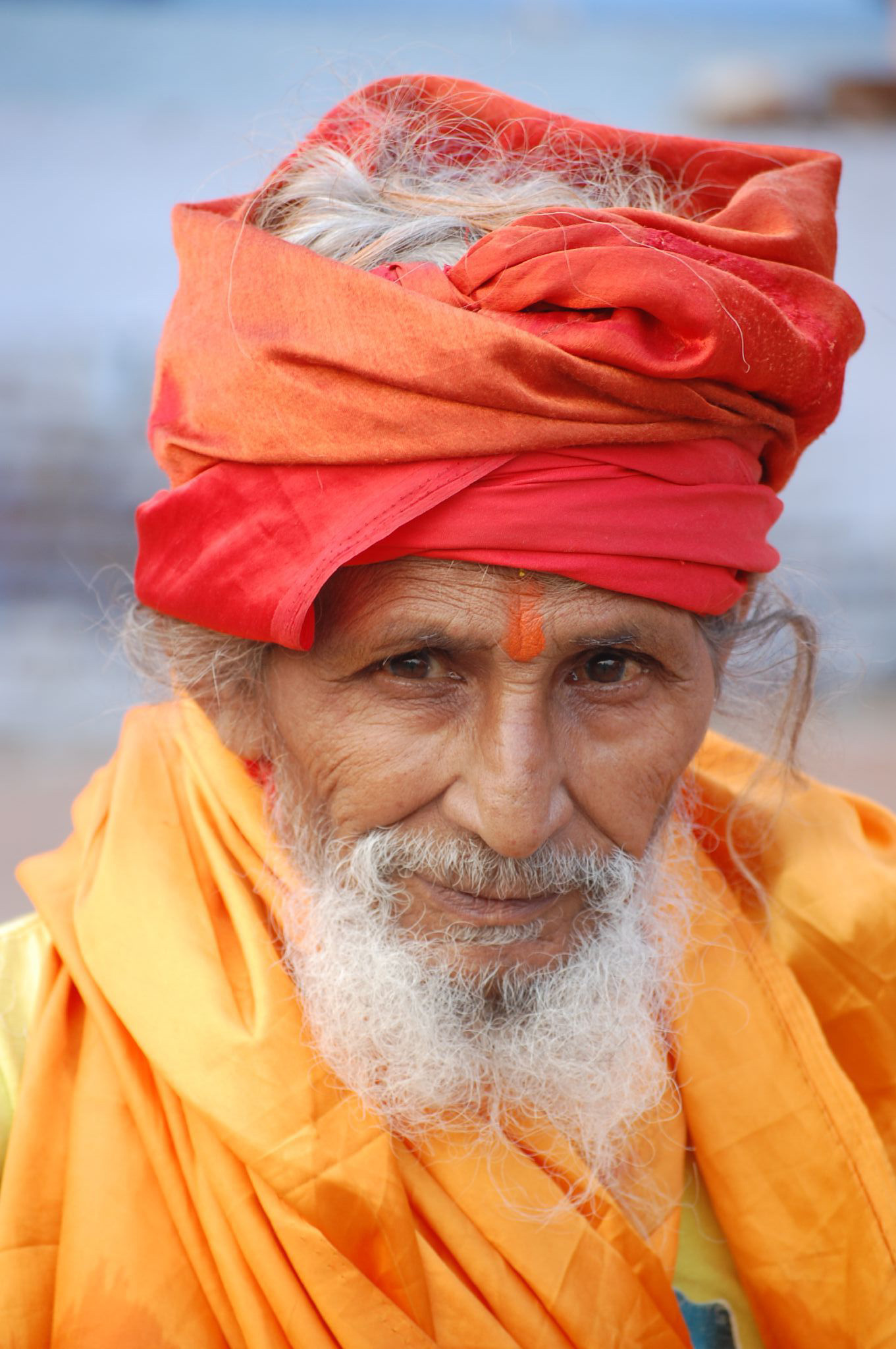
A sadhu in orange attire

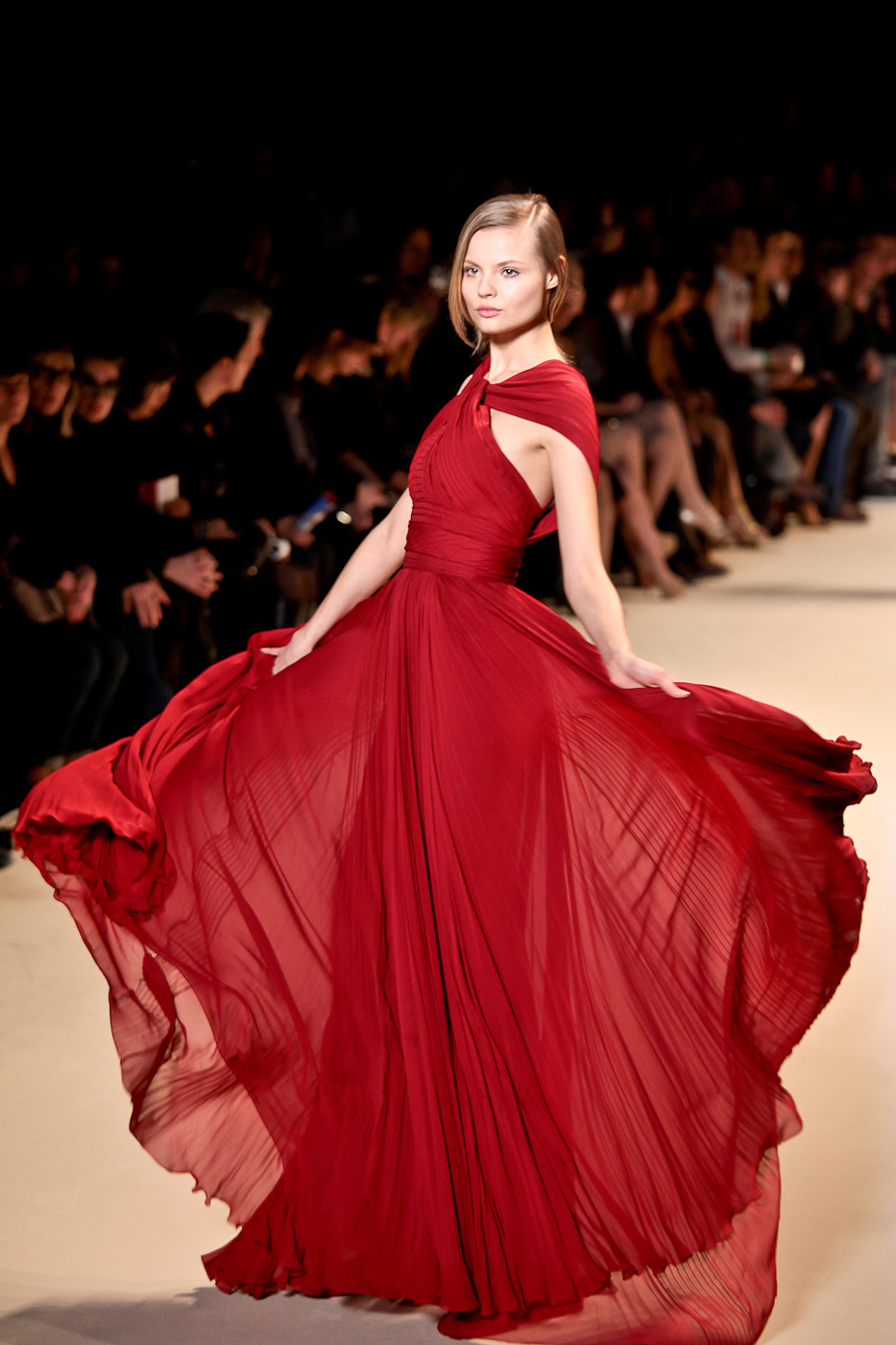
Magdalena Frąckowiak wearing a red gown

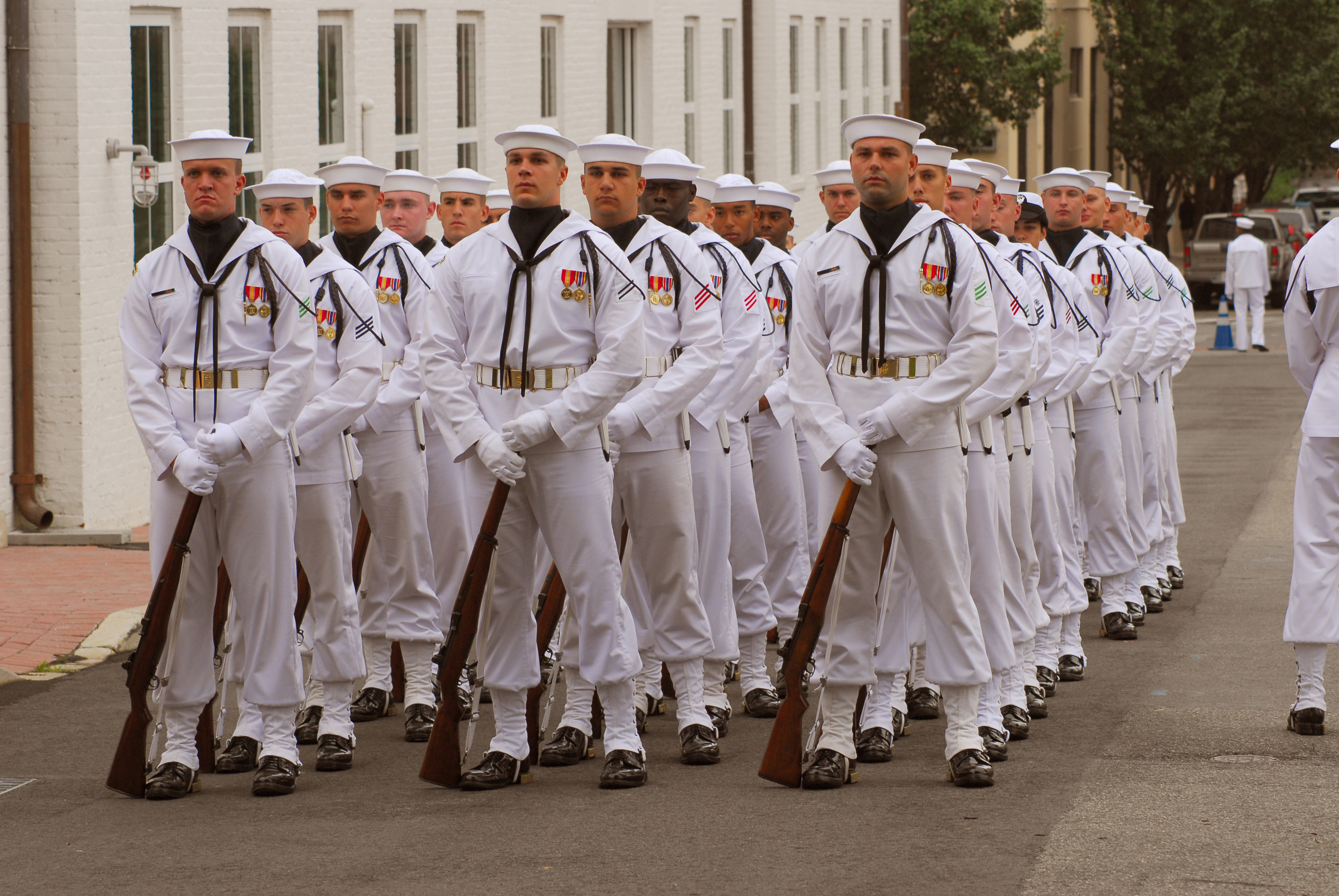
Enlisted sailors of the United States Navy in full dress whites during a retirement ceremony

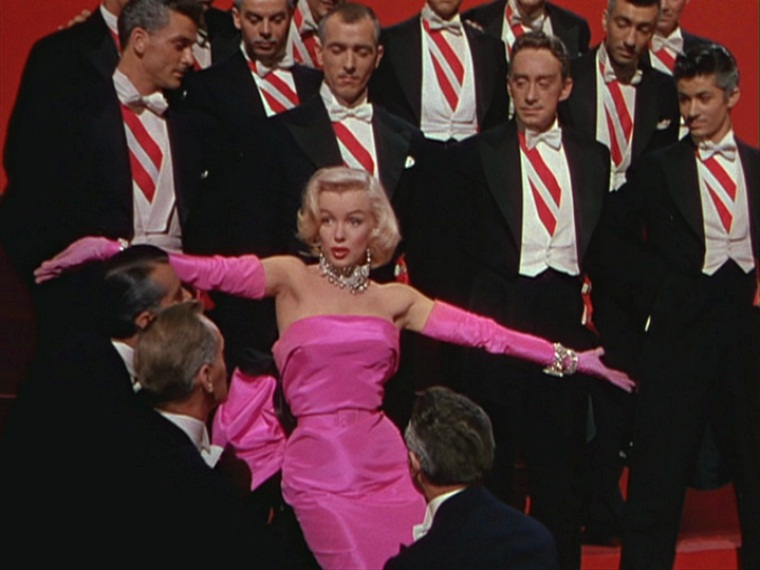
Marilyn Monroe's pink dress

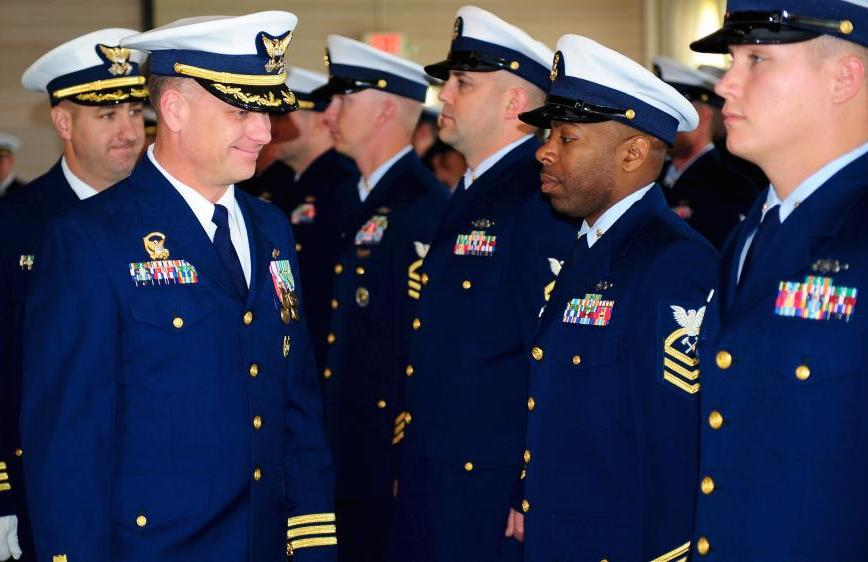
Members of the United States Coast Guard in full dress blues during a change of command ceremony at Coast Guard Base Kodiak

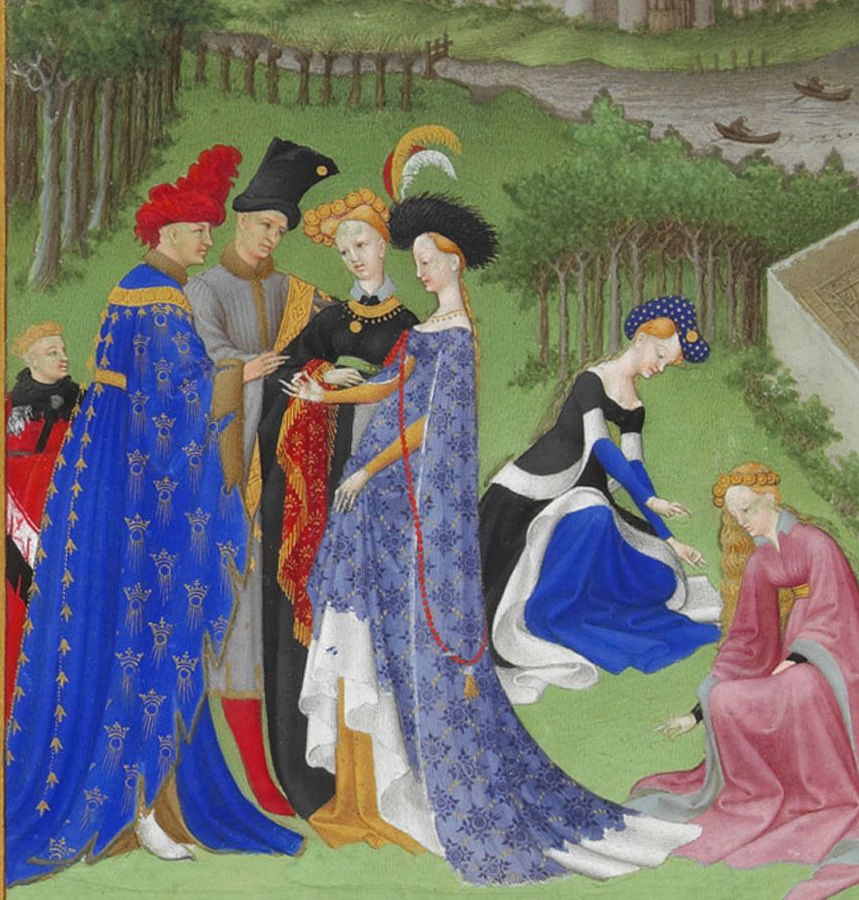
1400–1500 in European fashion

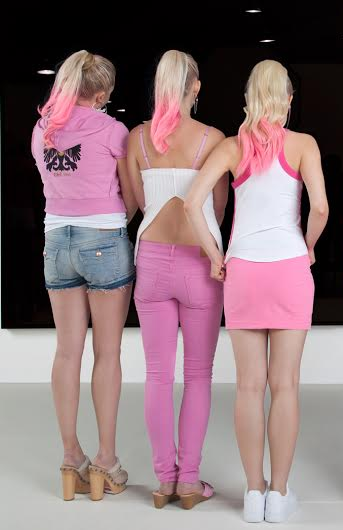
Models at an event in the UK, wearing (from left to right) shorts, trousers, and a mini skirt

== See also ==
- Color analysis (art)
- Clothing laws by country
- Color appearance model
- Colour fastness
- Court dress
- Dress code
- International Commission on Illumination
- Political color
