= List of most valuable celebrity memorabilia =

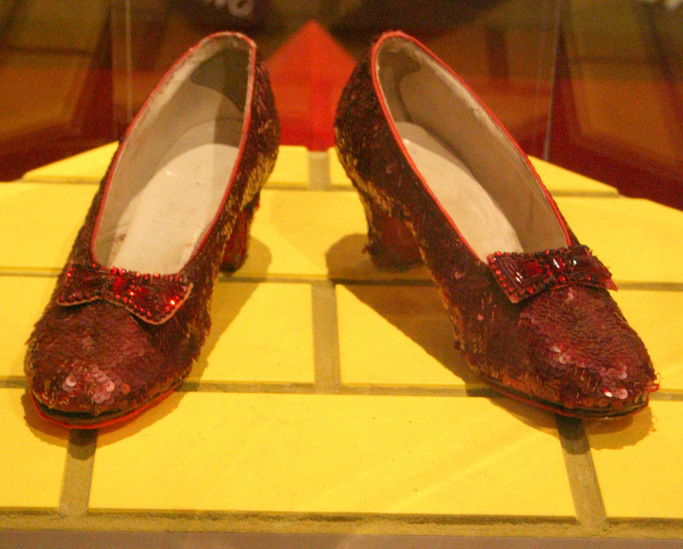
In 2024, the Ruby slippers worn by Judy Garland in The Wizard of Oz, became the most valuable memorabilia in film history.

The following is a list of most valuable celebrity memorabilia (or most expensive celebrity items auctioned), consisting of individual items sold with an auction price of US$2 million or more and events with total sales of US$20 million or more. Some figures may or may not include buyer's premium, causing some reports to vary by media.

It includes personal belongings of public figures such as music artists, actors, athletes, models and socialites, and encompassess any collectible items sold at auction, from jewelry, musical instruments to manuscripts, cars and costumes worn in events or projects. The list excludes film props such as Robby the Robot and Batmobile, sports cards, auctioned musical instruments by manufacturers, or expensive things bought by, and, collectibles purchases made by a celebrity.

As of 2025, the Ruby slippers worn by Judy Garland in The Wizard of Oz as Dorothy Gale remain the most expensive item of entertainment memorabilia ever sold, as well as the most expensive film memorabilia, at over $28 million. Babe Ruth's jersey for the 1932 World Series fetched $24.1 million in 2024, becoming the most valued sports collectible item.

== Most valuable items ==
Key
‡	Current record holder for the category

=== Individual items ===
Purchase price	Celebrity or item	Type	Date of sale	Auctioneer	Buyer	Namesake or item photo	Ref(s).
$28 million (Note: The pair was sold at auction for $28 million by Heritage Auctions (ultimately $32.5 million after auction house's fees are included))	Ruby slippers worn by Judy Garland (as Dorothy Gale)	Shoes	2024	Heritage Auctions	E-Land Group		
$27.4 million	Barbara Hutton's jade necklace	Jewelry	2014	Sotheby's	—N/a		
$24.1 million	Babe Ruth's 1932 World Series Game 3 jersey	Sportswear	2024	Heritage Auctions	—N/a		
$20 million	Gary Cooper's 1935 Duesenberg "SSJ"	Car	2018	Gooding & Company	—N/a		
$17.8 million	Paul Newman's Rolex Daytona	Watch	2017	Phillips Auction	—N/a		
$14.55 million	David Gilmour's Black Strat guitar	Musical instrument	2026	Christie's	—N/a		
$14 million	Michael Jordan's 1998 NBA Finals Game 2 jersey	Sportswear	2026	Hunt Auctions	—N/a		
$12.26 million	Michael Jordan's 1998 NBA Finals Game 3 jersey	Sportswear	2026	Joopiter	—N/a		
$11.8 million	Elizabeth Taylor's La Peregrina pearl	Jewelry	2011	Christie's	—N/a		
$11.56 million	Jerry Garcia's Tiger guitar	Musical instrument	2026	Christie's	Bobby Tseitlin	Jerry Garcia at Red Rocks taken 1987-08-11	
$11 million	Steve McQueen's 1968 Ford GT40 Gulf/Mirage Coupe	Car	2012	RM Auctions	—N/a		
$10.9 million	James Coburn's 1961 Ferrari 250 GT SWB Cal-Spyder	Car	2008	RM Auctions	—N/a		
$10.09 million	Michael Jordan's 1998 NBA Finals Game 1 jersey	Sportswear	2022	Sotheby's	—N/a		
$9.3 million	Diego Maradona's "Hand of God" 1986 World Cup jersey	Sportswear	2022	Sotheby's	—N/a		
$8.8 million	Elizabeth Taylor Diamond	Jewelry	2011	Christie's	—N/a		
$7 million	Kobe Bryant's 1996–97 Los Angeles Lakers jersey	Sportswear	2025	Sotheby's	—N/a		
$6.9 million	Kurt Cobain's Blue Fender Mustang	Musical instrument	2026	Christie's	—N/a		
$6.27 million	Andy Warhol's 1955 Ferrari 857 Sport	Car	2012	Gooding & Company	—N/a		
$6 million	Kurt Cobain's 1959 Martin D-18E Guitar	Musical instrument	2020	Julien's Auctions	Peter Freedman		
$5.64 million	Babe Ruth's 1928-1930 New York Yankees jersey	Sportswear	2019	Sotheby's	—N/a		
$5.6 million	White dress of Marilyn Monroe	Dress	2011	Profiles in History	—N/a		
$5.2 million	Jackie Robinson's 1951 Brooklyn Dodgers jersey	Sportswear	2024	Heritage Auctions	—N/a		
$5.1 million	Marlon Brando's Rolex GMT-Master	Watch	2023	Phillips Auction	—N/a		
$4.8 million	Marilyn Monroe's "Happy Birthday, Mr. President" dress	Dress	2016	Julien's Auctions	Ripley’s Believe It or Not		
$4.5 million	Audrey Hepburn's My Fair Lady dress	Dress	2011	Profiles in History	—N/a		
$4.4 million	Babe Ruth's 1920 Yankees jersey	Sportswear	2012	Heritage Auctions	—N/a		
$4.3 million	James Naismith's Founding Rules of Basketball	Sports manuscript	2010	Sotheby's	—N/a		
$4.2 million	Elizabeth Taylor's Mike Todd Tiara	Jewelry	2011	Christie's	—N/a		
$4.2 million	Jackie Robinson's 1950 Brooklyn Dodgers jersey	Sportswear	2021	Hunt Auction	—N/a		
$3.93 million	Eddie Van Halen's Kramer Guitars	Musical instrument	2023	Sotheby's	—N/a		
$3 million	Eric Clapton's The Fool guitar	Musical instrument	2026	Christie's	—N/a	The Fool SG (1964 Gibson SG) played by Eric Clapton (Cream), present from George Harrison to Eric Clapton (Cream), painted in 1967 by The Fool Collective - Play It Loud. MET (2019-05-13 19.29.10 by Eden, Janine and Jim)	
$3 million	Mark McGwire's 70th-home-run baseball	Sport memorabilia	1999	Guernsey's	Todd McFarlane		
$2.93 million	Hat worn by Margaret Hamilton (as Wicked Witch of the West)	Clothing	2024	Heritage Auctions	—N/a		
$2.9 million	The Beatles's Drumhead	Musical instrument	2026	Christie's	—N/a		
$2.85 million	John Lennon's Framus Hootenanny	Musical instrument	2024	Julien's Auctions	—N/a		
$2.7 million	Michael Jordan's 1997 Ferrari 550 Maranello	Car	2026	Joopiter	—N/a		
$2.51 million	"The Times They Are a-Changin'" by Bob Dylan	Music manuscript	2026	Christie's	—N/a	Bob Dylan - The Times They Are a-Changin'	
$2.4 million	John Lennon's Gibson J-160E	Musical instrument	2014	Julien's Auctions	Anonymous		
$2.2 million	John Lennon's 1965 Phantom V Rolls Royce	Car	1985	Sotheby's	Jim Pattison		
$2.1 million	Hank Aaron's 1954 Milwaukee Braves jersey	Sportswear	2024	Heritage Auctions	—N/a		
$2.05 million	Jackie Robinson's 1947 Brooklyn Dodgers jersey	Sportswear	2017	Heritage Auctions	—N/a		
$2.04 million	"Like a Rolling Stone" by Bob Dylan ‡	Music manuscript	2014	Sotheby's	—N/a		
$2 million	Clark Gable's Mercedes Gullwing	Car	2013	Barrett-Jackson	—N/a		

=== Highest-grossing events ===
Total sales	Title event	Subject	Description	Date of sale	Auction house	Ref(s).
$137.2 million	The Collection of Elizabeth Taylor: The Legendary Jewels	Elizabeth Taylor memorabilia	269 items of jewellery, also items of art, fashion and movies	Dec. 13–14/2011	Christie's	
$93.7 million	The Jim Irsay Collection: Icons of History	Mixed music and pop-culture memorabilia	Various items	Mar. 12-24/2026	Christie's	
$61.9 million	(Annual) Summer Platinum Night Sports Auction	Mixed sport memorabilia	Various items	Aug. 23-25/2024	Heritage Auctions	
$38.6 million	Hollywood/Entertainment Signature® Auction	Mixed film memorabilia	Various items	Dec. 7/2024	Heritage Auctions	
$21.1 million	Game of Thrones: The Auction	Game of Thrones memorabilia	900 items (costumes, props, weapons, and jewelry items)	Oct. 10-12/2024	Heritage Auctions	

== See also ==
- List of film memorabilia
- Lists of most expensive items by category
  - List of most expensive celebrity photographs
  - List of most expensive sports cards
  - List of most valuable records
  - List of most expensive books and manuscripts
