= List of film memorabilia =

This is a list of film memorabilia.

Film memorabilia can include: autographs, collectibles, original concept art, costumes, lobby cards, magazines, posters, press kits, pressbooks, props, scripts, slides, still photos, and storyboards, as well as promotional material (e.g., t-shirts).

== Costumes ==
Film	Memorabilia
2001: A Space Odyssey (1968)	In July 2020, a silver space suit was sold at auction in Los Angeles for $370,000, exceeding its estimate of $200,000–300,000. Four layers of paint indicate it was used in multiple scenes. The helmet of the suit had been painted green at one stage, leading to a belief that it may have been worn during the scene where Dave Bowman disconnects HAL 9000.
Alien (1979)	The puffy, white space suit Sigourney Weaver wore—designed by John Mollo—sold at auction for $204,800.
Ben-Hur (1959)	Charlton Heston's tunic, robe, and accessories from the film were put up for bid in Debbie Reynolds' 2011 Profiles in History auction.
Breakfast at Tiffany's (1961)	Audrey Hepburn's "little black Givenchy dress", plus a few minor items, fetched £467,200 ($923,187) for the City of Joy Foundation in 2006.
Casablanca (1942)	Captain Renault's white uniform sold for $55,000 in the June 2011 Debbie Reynolds auction.
Cinderella Man (2005)	Russell Crowe's jockstrap was purchased by the HBO television show Last Week Tonight with John Oliver and then donated to a Blockbuster Video shop.
Dr. No (1962)	The white bikini worn by Ursula Andress was first sold by Andress for £41,125 in 2001. It was later auctioned in November 2020. The actual winning bid is not specified, but pre-auction estimates were between $300,000 and $500,000.
Gentlemen Prefer Blondes (1953)	Marilyn Monroe's red-sequined dress was auctioned off for $1.2 million in the June 2011 auction of Debbie Reynolds' collection.
Gentlemen Prefer Blondes (1953)	Monroe's pink dress, which she wore in the "Diamonds Are a Girl's Best Friend" number, sold for $314,000 in June 2010.
Gilda (1946)	The two-piece costume worn by Rita Hayworth in the "Amado Mio" nightclub sequence was offered as part of the "TCM Presents ... There's No Place Like Hollywood" auction on November 24, 2014, at Bonhams in New York. It was estimated that the costume would fetch between $40,000 and $60,000; it actually sold for $161,000.
Gilda (1946)	In April 2009, the black dress worn by Rita Hayworth in the "Put the Blame on Mame" scene was planned to be sold at an auction of the Forrest J. Ackerman estate, but was withdrawn before the auction. The initial estimated price was between $30,000 and $50,000.
Indiana Jones series (1981–2023)	Indiana Jones' trademark fedora hat sold for £320,000 (around $425,000)—£393,600 (about $520,000) with the 23% buyer's premium—in a September 2018 auction.
Le Mans (1971)	Steve McQueen's racing suit was auctioned off for $984,000 in 2011.
My Fair Lady (1964)	Audrey Hepburn's Ascot dress sold for $3,700,000 ($4,551,000 with additional fees and taxes) in the June 2011 Debbie Reynolds auction.
Saturday Night Fever (1977)	The white suit worn by John Travolta was purchased by film critic Gene Siskel in a charity auction for about $2000. He sold it for $145,000 (or £93,000) to an anonymous bidder at a Christie's auction around 1995.
The Seven Year Itch (1955)	Marilyn Monroe's white dress, the one whose skirt was raised by the updraft from a passing subway train, brought $4.6 million, not including an additional 20% buyer's premium, in the June 2011 Debbie Reynolds auction.
The Sound of Music (1965)	In July 2013, the outfits worn by Julie Andrews and the children in the "Do-Re-Mi" scene were auctioned off for $1.3 million at Profiles in History.
Star Wars franchise (1977–)	In 2003, a costume worn by Darth Vader in The Empire Strikes Back (1980) sold at an auction for $83,000.
Star Wars franchise (1977–)	In 2010, bids for a Vader costume used in Empire failed to meet the reserve price, stopping at £150,000.
Star Wars franchise (1977–)	In June 2017, Vader's helmet sold for $96,000 at an auction.
Star Wars franchise (1977–)	In September 2018, bidding for Han Solo's jacket from Empire stalled at £450,000 ($630,742), below the reserve price of £500,000 ($700,825), so it was not sold.
Superman original series (1978–2006)	Christopher Reeve's costume from the 1978 Superman film brought in $115,000 at a 2007 Hollywood auction, while his Superman III costume sold for $200,000 in 2018.
Tarzan the Ape Man films (1932–1948)	The loincloth of Johnny Weissmuller's Tarzan was sold at the 1970 MGM auction.
The Tramp films (1914–1940)	One of Charlie Chaplin's trademark bowler hats was put up for bid in Debbie Reynolds' 2011 Profiles in History auction.
Willy Wonka and the Chocolate Factory (1971)	In 2012, the entire outfit worn by Willy Wonka (Gene Wilder)—including his purple suit coat and frilled shirt—sold for $73,800.
The Wizard of Oz (1939)	Four pairs of Dorothy's ruby slippers in the style familiar to viewers are known to have survived.: One pair is on permanent display at the National Museum of American History, a gift from an anonymous donor. This is probably the pair sold at the 1970 MGM auction for $15,000.; Another pair was sold to Michael Shaw the same year. While on display at the Judy Garland Museum, it was stolen in 2005 and recovered in September 2018. On December 7, 2024, this pair was sold at auction for $28 million by Heritage Auctions ($32.5 million after auction fees were included), making it the most "valuable movie memorabilia ever sold at auction," according to Heritage Auctions.; Philip Samuels paid $165,000 for a pair in 1981. In 2012, Leonardo DiCaprio and other benefactors acquired the pair for an undisclosed price for the Academy of Motion Picture Arts and Sciences' forthcoming museum.; The fourth pair was last sold in 2000 to David Elkouby and his partners for $666,000.
The Wizard of Oz (1939)	Actress Debbie Reynolds purchased a much more fanciful Arabian-motif pair of slippers that was used only in costume tests before being rejected. It was sold in the first of a series of 2011 auctions of her extensive collection, going for $510,000, with the buyer's premium and taxes raising the total to $627,300.
The Wizard of Oz (1939)	Judy Garland's blue cotton dress, used in test shots or during the first two weeks of filming, was sold in the 2011 Debbie Reynolds auction for $910,000.
The Wizard of Oz (1939)	Garland's "blue and white gingham pinafore with a fitted bodice and a full skirt", believed to be one of two she wore on-screen, went for $1,565,000 (including buyer's premium) in 2015.
The Wizard of Oz (1939)	Two sets of Cowardly Lion costumes exist. The question of which was worn by Bert Lahr is disputed. One set, initially part of the MGM auction, was sold by sculptor Bill Mack in 2006 for $826,000. The other costume, supposedly rescued from the trash bins at the MGM auction, was in the possession of noted collector James Comisar until November 24, 2014, when it was sold at a Bonhams auction in New York for $3,077,000 (including buyer's premium). According to Comisar, the "unique fur swirls" confirm that his costume was the one worn in key scenes.
The Wizard of Oz (1939)	The Scarecrow costume, less the mask (which had to be replaced repeatedly during filming), is held by the National Museum of American History.
The Wizard of Oz (1939)	The Wicked Witch of the West's black hat went for $197,400 in 2008. In 2024, another witch hat worn by Margaret Hamilton was sold at Heritage Auction's Hollywood & Entertainment Signature Auction for $2,930,000.
The Wizard of Oz (1939)	$115,000 was paid for a Winkie costume in 2007.

Costumes
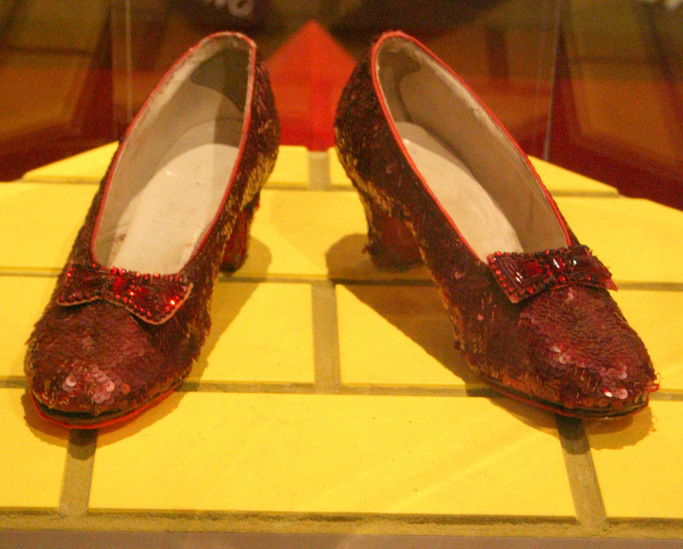
A pair of ruby slippers from The Wizard of Oz on display in the Smithsonian Institution's National Museum of American History

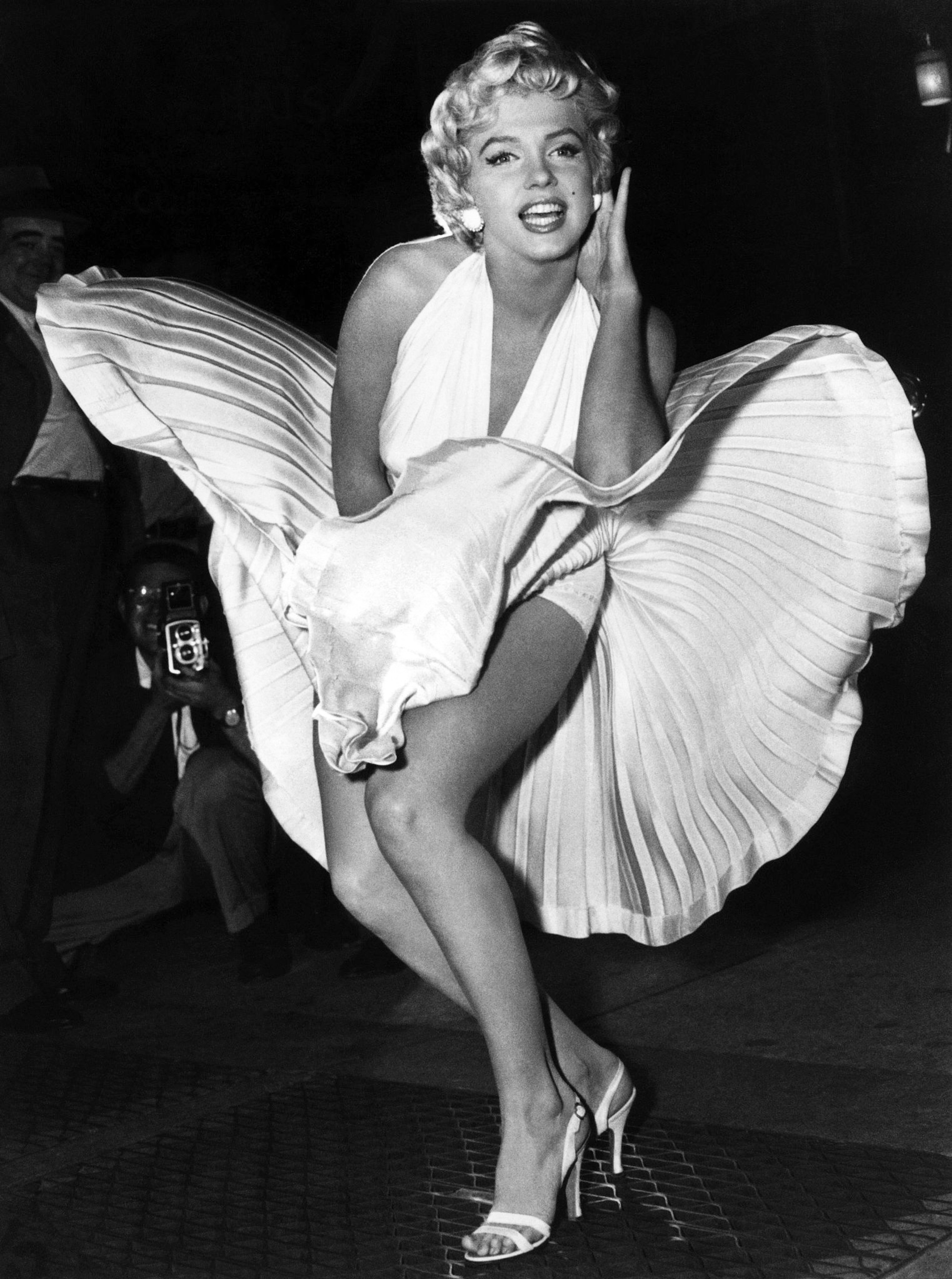
Marilyn Monroe posing for photographers in a white dress during production of The Seven Year Itch

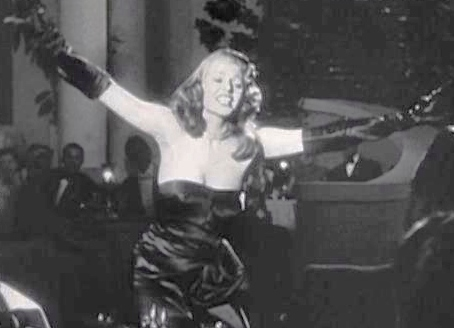
Rita Hayworth wearing a black dress in the "Put the Blame on Mame" number from Gilda

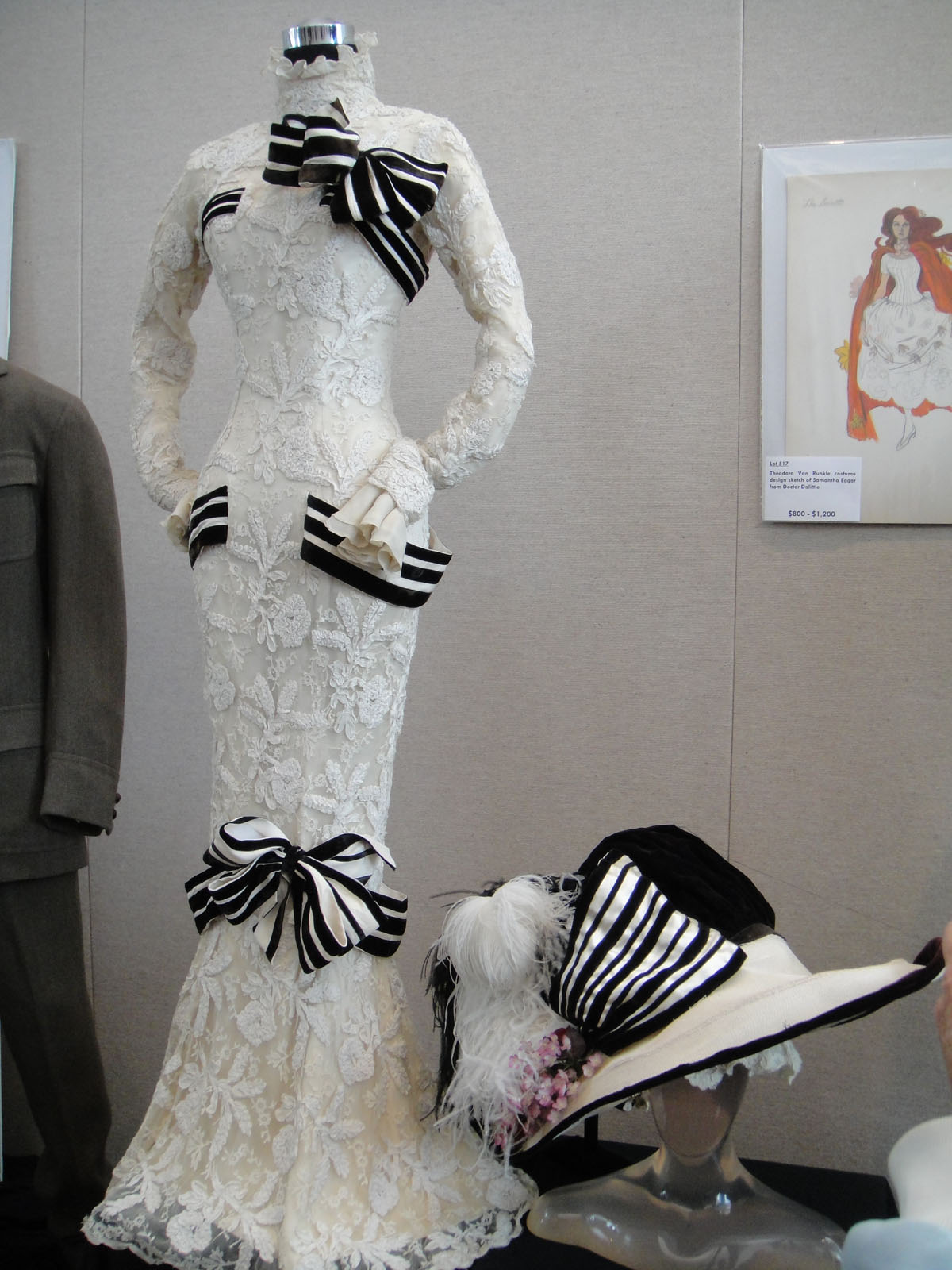
Audrey Hepburn's Ascot dress from My Fair Lady

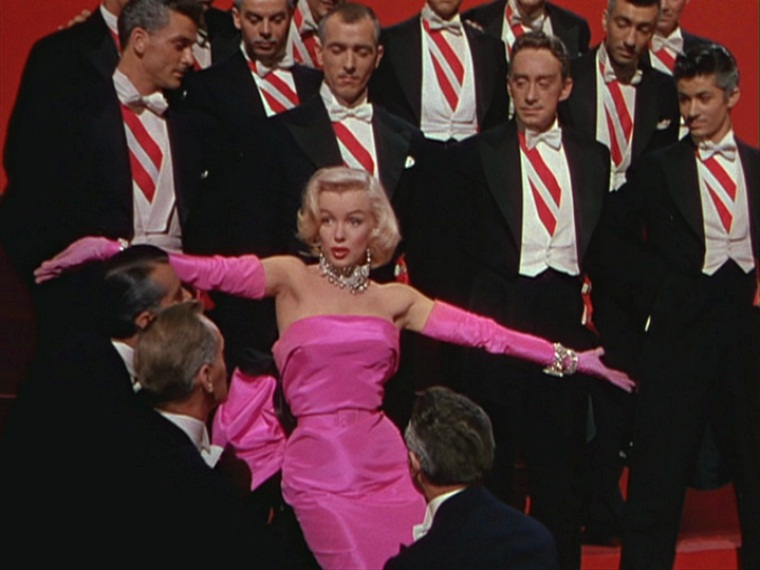
Marilyn Monroe in a pink dress in the "Diamonds Are a Girl's Best Friend" number from Gentlemen Prefer Blondes

== Props and equipment ==
Film	Memorabilia
Citizen Kane (1941)	In 2025, a red wooden sled marked with the name “Rosebud” used in the making of the Citizen Kane was sold at Heritage Auctions for $14.75 million.
Aliens (1986)	One of the "hypersleep chamber" props sold at auction in 2012 for $65,000.
Back to the Future trilogy (1985–1990)	In 2011, one of the seven DeLoreans used in the trilogy sold for $541,000. Some of the proceeds went to The Michael J. Fox Foundation.
Back to the Future trilogy (1985–1990)	In 2012, the brain-wave analyzer from the first Back to the Future (1985) sold for $70,000.
Back to the Future trilogy (1985–1990)	In 2018, the hoverboard—made by Mattel—that Marty McFly uses in Back to the Future Part II (1989) sold for $28,800.
Casablanca (1942)	In 1988, the piano played by Sam in the Paris flashback went to Japanese trading firm C. Itoh & Co., whose winning bid of $154,000 was on behalf of an unnamed client. It was sold again in New York City on December 14, 2012, at Sotheby's for more than $600,000 to an anonymous bidder.
Casablanca (1942)	On November 24, 2014, the piano on which Sam plays "As Time Goes By" in Rick's Café Américain (and in which Rick hides the letters of transit) was sold for $2,900,000 (the buyer's premium bringing the total to $3,413,000) by Bonhams in New York City.
Casablanca (1942)	In the same auction, the only known surviving copy of the letters of transit, though apparently not used onscreen, went for $118,750 (including buyer's premium).
Casablanca (1942)	The 1940 Buick Phaeton driven by Captain Renault, with Rick Blaine, Ilsa Lund and Victor Laszlo as passengers, to the airport in the final sequence was sold by Bonhams in November 2013 for $380,000 ($461,000 with the buyer's premium).
Bullitt (1968)	The two Ford Mustang GTs used in the film disappeared for nearly four decades. The one in better shape was unveiled at the North American International Auto Show in Detroit on January 14, 2018, coinciding with the unveiling of the 2018 special edition Mustang commemorating the 50th anniversary of the movie. The other one, missing some parts, resurfaced in a custom car paint shop in Mexicali, Mexico.
Chitty Chitty Bang Bang (1968)	The only fully functional car of the six made for the film was authenticated by the star, Dick Van Dyke, and put up for auction by Profiles in History. However, the initial price of $950,000 failed to attract any bids. It was later sold to an unnamed buyer for $800,000.
Citizen Kane (1941)	Steven Spielberg paid $60,500 (including 10% commission) for the only remaining balsa "Rosebud" sled used in the Orson Welles film. It was auctioned on June 9, 1982, by Sotheby's in New York. Welles stated in a telephone interview that there were three sleds made of balsa, which were intended to be burned in the final scene, and one hardwood sled that was used earlier the film.
Citizen Kane (1941)	The painted pine "Rosebud" sled used in the earlier part of the film was sold for $233,500 at auction on December 16, 1996, by Christie's in Los Angeles. The purchaser was not identified. It was from the estate of Robert Bauer, an Army retiree who in early 1942 was a 12-year-old student in Brooklyn and a member of his school's film club. He won an RKO Pictures publicity contest and selected Rosebud as his prize. Bauer's son told CBS News that his mother had once wanted to paint the sled and use it as a plant stand. "Instead, my dad said, 'No, just save it and put it in the closet.'"
Forbidden Planet (1956)	Robby the Robot's price was $5.375 million in November 2017, making it the most expensive prop ever sold at auction.
Indiana Jones series (1981–2023)	Indiana Jones' bullwhip, used in Raiders of the Lost Ark, Indiana Jones and the Temple of Doom and Indiana Jones and the Last Crusade, cost the winning bidder $216,000 in 2014.
James Bond series (1962–)	Two Aston Martin DB5s are said to have been driven by Sean Connery in Goldfinger (1964) and Thunderball (1965). (Another two were used for promotion.) One of the screen-used ones was reported stolen in 1997. The other was purchased by Harry Yeaggy at an October 2010 auction for £2,600,000 ($4,600,000 with auction fees included). A fully restored promotional DB5, with all the Bond modifications working, sold for $6,400,000 in a 2019 auction.
James Bond series (1962–)	"Wet Nellie", the Lotus Esprit sports car / submarine in The Spy Who Loved Me (1977), was bought by Elon Musk at a London auction for £616,000 in September 2013.
Jurassic Park (1993)	One of Stan Winston's velociraptors sold for $77,000 at a 2009 auction.
King Kong (1933)	£121,250 ($200,305), including buyer's premium, bought an armature/skeleton of the largest of the miniature models of Kong in November 2009.
The Lord of the Rings trilogy (2001–03)	Frodo (and Bilbo) Baggins' sword, Sting, was sold for $156,000 in December 2013.
The Lord of the Rings trilogy (2001–03)	Gimli's battle axe fetched $180,000 in the same 2013 auction.
The Lord of the Rings trilogy (2001–03)	£245,500 was the winning bid for Gandalf's staff in an October 2014 auction.
The Maltese Falcon (1941)	There were several statuettes made of the Maltese Falcon—two lead ones weighing 47 pounds (21 kg) each, and a 7-pound (3.2 kg), more finely crafted, resin model—all handled by Humphrey Bogart. Christie's auctioned off one of the lead ones, a gift from Warner Bros. studio head Jack Warner to William Conrad, on December 6, 1994, for $398,500 to Ronald Winston, president of Harry Winston, Inc. A lead falcon, the only one confirmed to have appeared in the movie, was sold at auction to an unidentified buyer for $3,500,000 ($4,085,000 including buyer's premium) on November 25, 2013. It was later revealed that the Falcon had been bought by a representative of Steve Wynn. Documentary director Ara Chekmayan (Children of Darkness) and "Internet entrepreneur" Hank Risan each claimed to have the resin version. Chekmayan's was sold at auction in 2000 for $92,000; ten years later, a group that included Leonardo DiCaprio bought it for over $300,000.
Modern Times (1936)	The Tramp's cane was sold at auction for $350,000 in July 2013, according to Profiles in History.
The Seventh Seal (1957)	The chess set used in the match between the knight and Death, missing the white king (which was damaged during production), sold for one million Swedish krona ($143,000 at the time).
Star Wars franchise (1977–)	In 2005, the hilt of Darth Vader's lightsaber from The Empire Strikes Back (1980) sold for $118,000.
Star Wars franchise (1977–)	A still-functioning Panavision PSR 35mm camera used to film Star Wars (1977) went for $625,000 in the December 2011 Reynolds auction, breaking records for Star Wars memorabilia and vintage cameras.
Star Wars franchise (1977–)	In June 2017, an R2-D2 droid "compiled from parts" used during filming of the trilogy sold for $2,760,000, setting the record for Star Wars memorabilia.
Star Wars franchise (1977–)	In that same 2017 auction, the lightsaber used by Luke Skywalker in Star Wars (1977) and The Empire Strikes Back (1980) was sold to Ripley Entertainment for $450,000. In December that year, the lightsaber made its public debut at Ripley's Believe It or Not Odditorium, where it was set to be on display until mid-January 2018.
Star Wars franchise (1977–)	The lightsaber of Qui-Gon Jinn from The Phantom Menace (1999) was auctioned off for $66,710.
Star Wars franchise (1977–)	In June 2018, Han Solo's blaster from Return of the Jedi brought in $550,000.
Star Wars franchise (1977–)	On 12 November 2026, the lightsaber Darth Vader used in The Empire Strikes Back and Return of the Jedi, in particular in the scene where he tells Luke Skywalker, "I am your father.", sold for $4.875 million.
The Time Machine (1960)	The time machine was sold at the 1970 MGM auction.
Willy Wonka and the Chocolate Factory (1971)	Five Willy Wonka candy bars sold for $17,000 in 2019.
Willy Wonka and the Chocolate Factory (1971)	Only two Everlasting Gobstopper props are known to exist. The first was sold for $42,500 at auction in May 2011; the second was kept by Julie Dawn Cole, who played Veruca in the film, and was sold from the Dreier Collection in July 2012 for $40,000.

== Other ==
Memorabilia type	Film	Memorabilia
Oscars	Cavalcade (1933)	The film's Best Picture Oscar statuette fetched $332,165 at auction in 2012.
Oscars	Citizen Kane (1941)	Herman Mankiewicz's Oscar was sold at least twice, in 1999 and again in 2012, the second time for $588,455.
Oscars	Citizen Kane (1941)	Orson Welles' Oscar was sold at auction in 2011 by an anonymous seller to an anonymous buyer for $861,542.
Oscars	Gone with the Wind (1939)	Michael Jackson paid $1.54 million for the Best Picture Oscar at a 1999 Sotheby's auction; after his death, the Oscar could not be found.
Oscars	How Green Was My Valley (1941)	The Academy Award for Best Picture statuette went for $95,600 in 2004, then $274,520 in 2012.
Posters and poster-related	Metropolis (1927)	An original poster set a record by selling for $690,000 in 2006. The ninth most expensive poster is also for this film, going for $357,750 in 2000.
Posters and poster-related	The Mummy (1932)	A movie poster for The Mummy was auctioned off for $453,000 in 1997, making it the fifth most valuable poster.
Posters and poster-related	Star Wars (1977)	The painting that was reproduced in a Star Wars poster went for $3.875 million in 2025.
Scripts	Casablanca (1942)	Producer Hal B. Wallis's "working copy of the shooting script" sold for $68,750, including buyer's premium, on November 25, 2013.
Scripts	Citizen Kane (1941)	A working draft script for Citizen Kane was sold for $11,000 by Christie's in December 1991. The second-draft script is marked "Mr. Welles' working copy" in pencil on the manila cover. The Christie's lot also included a working script from The Magnificent Ambersons. The working draft alone was sold at auction by Sotheby's on March 5–6, 2014. Expected to bring between $25,080 and $33,440, it sold for $164,692.

== See also ==
- List of individual dresses
- List of most valuable celebrity memorabilia
