= Pink dress of Marilyn Monroe =

Iconic dress by designer William "Billy" Travilla

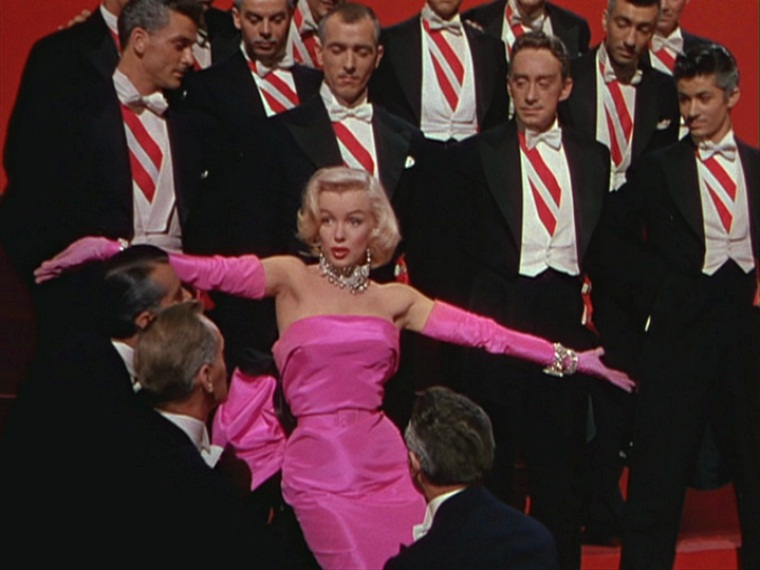
- Designer: William Travilla
- Year: 1953
- Type: Pink dress
- Material: Satin

Marilyn Monroe wore a shocking pink dress in the 1953 film Gentlemen Prefer Blondes, directed by Howard Hawks. The dress was created by the costume designer William "Billy" Travilla and used in one of the most famous scenes of the film when she performed "Diamonds Are a Girl's Best Friend", which subsequently became the subject of numerous imitations, significantly by Madonna in the music video for her 1985 song "Material Girl".

== History ==
Original sketch

When the costume designer William Travilla, known simply as Travilla, began working with Marilyn Monroe, he had already won an Oscar for his work in Adventures of Don Juan in 1948. Travilla designed the clothes of the actress in eight films, and later claimed to have had a brief affair with Monroe. In 1953 Travilla designed the costumes for Gentlemen Prefer Blondes.

Original costume proposed for the scene

Monroe was originally to wear a breathtaking showgirl costume, costing nearly $4,000 (equivalent to US$37,824 in 2024). It had jewels sewn onto a black fish-net bodystocking up to the breasts, then covered in nude fabric, embellished with a mass of diamonds.

During production, it became public knowledge that Monroe had posed nude for a calendar in 1949, before she became well-known. Travilla was instructed to design a new, less-revealing costume to distance Monroe from the scandal. He designed the pink dress as a last-minute replacement.

Monroe wore the pink dress in the role of Lorelei Lee in the famous sequence in which the actress sings the song "Diamonds Are a Girl's Best Friend", accompanied by many suitors in dinner clothes. Travilla's notes reveal that Monroe wore two identical copies in the scene, as it took a long time to shoot and the dress, being floor length, was very prone to getting dirt on it.

The only pink dress known to survive was auctioned at Profiles in History on 11 June 2010, with an estimated price of between $150,000 and $250,000 and described as "the most important film costume to ever come to auction". The dress ultimately sold for $370,000. It was described in the auction catalog as follows:

This Travilla-designed pink silk satin strapless gown features black satin lining on the oversized bow attached at back. Features integral brassier[e] with rear zipper closure (concealed with bow overlay) and interior Fox cleaning tag. Also comes with the original pair of screen-worn opera-length tubes worn over Marilyn’s arms (gloves are shown for display only) and pink satin belt with "M. Monroe A-698 1-27-3-7953" written on the inner leather lining. Originally designed to be a two-piece garment, this lot features an additional bonus having the original top made for this dress (featuring interior bias label handwritten "1-27-3-7971 M. Monroe A 698-74") that was not used in the production. This design was discarded due to the top and skirt separating when Marilyn raised her arms during the number. The gown exhibits slight toning in areas, common in silk garments from this era; otherwise in fine condition. The leather backing on the belt is cracked and missing in areas and silk exhibits fraying on edges.

Marilyn Monroe wore a white version of this dress (without the bow) to the premiere of her film There's No Business Like Show Business (1954). She was photographed extensively wearing this dress with a white fur stole and with a pair of matching opera gloves.

== Design ==
Monroe was originally going to wear a pair of black opera gloves with black Salvatore Ferragamo pumps but Travilla decided to change the colour of the gloves and shoes to match the gown. Travilla created this sketch after the original all-pink sketch to show what he had first considered.

The dress is constructed of shocking pink peau d'ange silk fabric, lined with black silk/satin, and was designed by William Travilla. The floor-length gown is strapless and features a straight neckline. The scene that features the dress is heavily choreographed, so a slit in the back of the dress was added to allow for movement. The dress also has a large "bow" on the back, which is part of the dress construction, not added on as a separate piece. The bow is lined with black satin and is pleated in back on one side of the gown and folded over and attached to the other section.

The outfit also features two-tone opera gloves. The gloves were mostly made of the same shocking pink peau d'ange fabric, whereas the palm section of was made of a lighter shade of pink suede.

The jewels Monroe wore were costume and not authentic diamonds. They were designed by Joan Castle Joseff of Joseff of Hollywood.

== Impact on popular culture ==
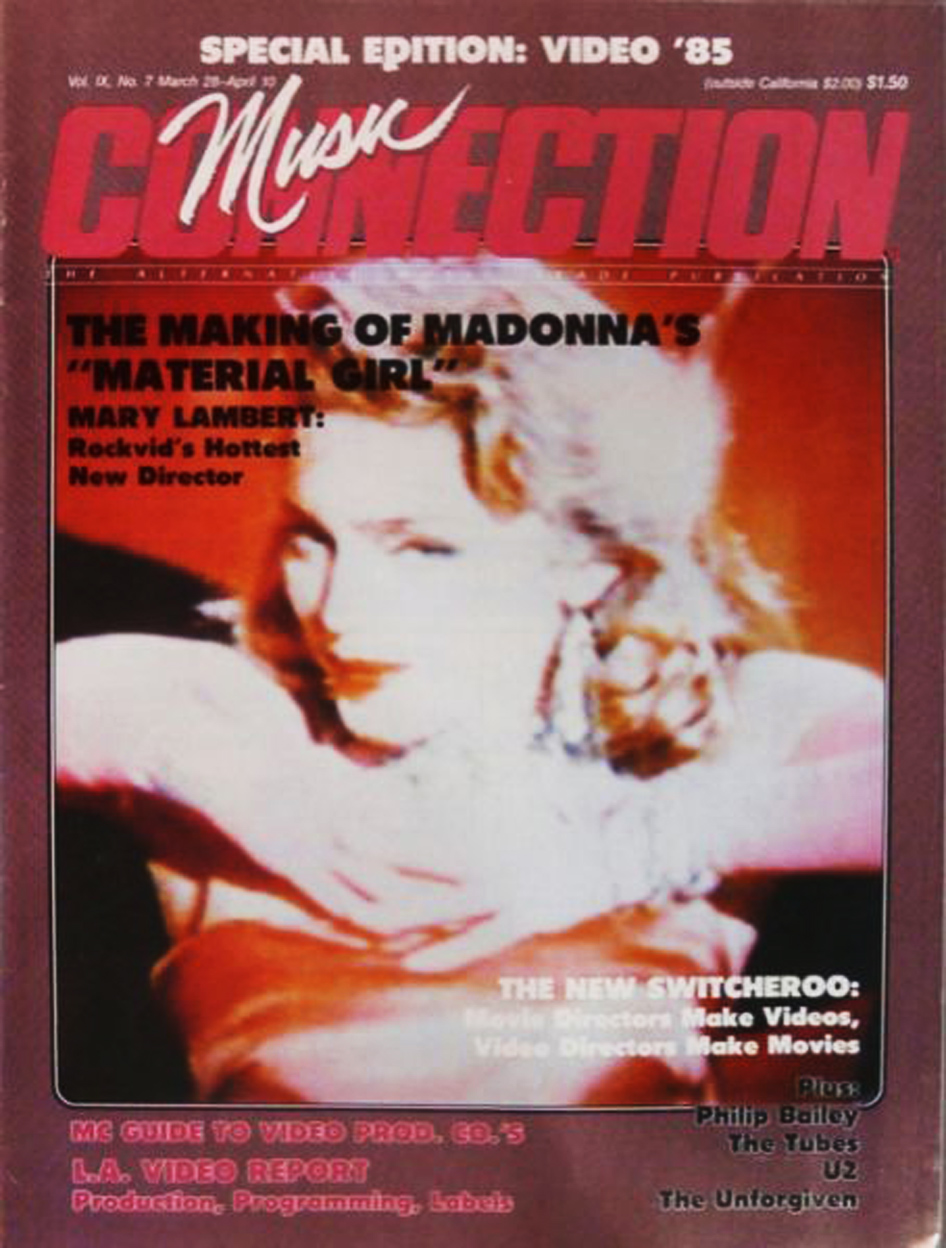
Madonna on the cover of the magazine Music Connection showing her own version of the dress.

Over the years the pink dress has become an icon of fashion and film, and like her white dress is often imitated and parodied. One of the most famous of all is the one represented by the singer Madonna in the music video for her 1985 hit "Material Girl".

== See also ==
- White dress of Marilyn Monroe
- Black dress of Rita Hayworth
- Black Givenchy dress of Audrey Hepburn
- List of film memorabilia
- List of individual dresses
