= Kent Warner =

American costume designer (1943–1984)

Kent Phillip Warner (March 8, 1943 – April 25, 1984) was a costume designer, best known for finding and acquiring the ruby slippers from the film The Wizard of Oz for the 1970 Metro-Goldwyn-Mayer Auction.

== Career ==
Metro-Goldwyn-Mayer (MGM) was sold in 1969, and as a cost-cutting measure, MGM President James T. Aubrey decided to hold a May 1970 auction of hundreds of thousands of props and wardrobe. Warner was hired to help catalog and prepare for the auction. He is known to have found four pairs used in the film (of five that have surfaced) on the MGM backlot. One pair became a centerpiece of the auction. He later sold all but one of the other pairs, keeping for himself the size 5B pair believed to have been worn by Judy Garland for static and closeup shots, which were in the best condition of the known pairs. In 1981, after being diagnosed with HIV, Kent decided to sell them to pay medical bills. He sold them through Christie's East in 1981 for $12,000. Movie star and noted film memorabilia collector Debbie Reynolds purchased an early version of the slippers, a very elaborate curled-toe "Arabian" pair that was rejected for the film, from Warner.

Kent Warner died in 1984 of complications of AIDS at the age of 41. He is buried at Forest Lawn Memorial Park (Hollywood Hills).
