= Profiles in History =

Auction house in Los Angeles, California (1985–2021)

- Type: Private
- Industry: Auction
- Founded: 1985
- Founder: Joseph Maddalena
- Defunct: January 2021
- Fate: Defunct after founder joined Heritage Auctions
- Headquarters: Los Angeles, California, United States
- Key people: Joseph Maddalena (President & CEO)
- Products: Hollywood memorabilia, historical documents, autographs, film props

Profiles in History was an auction house in Los Angeles, California. It was founded in 1985 by Joseph Maddalena, who is an auctioneer and dealer of authentic and original collectibles, including Hollywood memorabilia, historical autographs, letters, documents, vintage signed autographs, and manuscripts. Maddalena was the company's president and CEO. It became defunct in January 2021 when Maddalena joined former rival Heritage Auctions.

== Auctions ==
Profiles in History held Hollywood and historical auctions throughout the year.

=== Hollywood memorabilia ===
In October 2014, Profiles in History held their largest Hollywood memorabilia auction to date. The auction included Ian McKellan's "Gandalf The White" staff from The Lord of the Rings Trilogy, the "Indiana Jones" whip used in the 1981, 1984, and 1989 Indiana Jones movies, and Leonardo DiCaprio's "Jack Dawson" "King of The World" coat from Titanic.

In July 2013, the auction house presented a collection of Lucille Ball memorabilia as part of their second of two Drier Collection auctions.

On June 18, 2011, Profiles in History launched the first of a series of auctions of Debbie Reynolds' collection of Hollywood memorabilia. In June 2011, the auction house garnered $5.52 million for Marilyn Monroe's "Subway" dress from The Seven Year Itch. The dress broke the Guinness world record for the most expensive dress sold at auction. $4.4 million was secured for the Audrey Hepburn "Ascot" dress from My Fair Lady. In December 2011, the Panavision PSR 35mm camera that George Lucas used for principal photography on the first Star Wars film in 1977 was sold at auction for $625,000, a record price for a movie camera.

=== Historical auctions ===
Eight lots of Albert Einstein material, including an unpublished poem, were sold at Profiles in History's historical auction held in Calabasas, California, in December 2014. The sale also included a total of seven Abraham Lincoln items, including the desk Lincoln used in 1840–42 during his last term in the Illinois State House of Representatives and an autograph letter he wrote on August 17, 1860, to Thurlow Weed; a collection of 27 crime scene and autopsy photos of Bonnie Elizabeth Parker and Clyde Barrow (Bonnie and Clyde); and an autograph letter from Thomas Jefferson written while he was vice president.

After realizing over $6 million in sales for the first "The Property of A Distinguished American Private Collector" auction in December 2012, the company held a second in May 2013, offering notable letters and manuscripts. The second auction garnered national attention for the sale of Marilyn Monroe's undated letter to Lee Strasberg. Additional highlights from the auction included two large photograph albums documenting Mussolini's visit to Hitler in Germany in 1937, a one-page autograph letter in English by Karl Marx, and an 1805 autograph letter by Ludwig van Beethoven to opera singer Friedrich Sebastian Mayer.

== Television ==
Hollywood Treasure premiered on the Syfy channel on October 27, 2010, and featured Profiles in History president and CEO, Joseph Maddalena, and the company's head of acquisitions and consignment, Brian Chanes, among the cast. The weekly reality series, produced by Maddalena, examined the culture of showbiz collectors and pop culture memorabilia. The series ran for two seasons and ended in 2012.

=== Auction highlights ===
- A Vincent van Gogh autograph letter sharing his thoughts to an ailing friend was sold at the first "The Property of a Distinguished American Private Collector Auction" (December 2012).
- $1.56 million was secured for a collection of 21 costumes from The Sound of Music (July 2013).
- $1,092,000 was realized for Judy Garland's The Wizard of Oz blue cotton test dress, while Garland's Wizard of Oz ruby test slippers sold for $612,000 (June 2011).
- Steve McQueen's racing suit from Le Mans fetched $960,000 (December 2011). In 2012, the actor's Swiss Heuer wrist watch worn in the same film sold for $799,500 at auction.
- $660,000 for Julie Andrews' "Do-Re-Mi" dress from the Sound of Music (June 2011).
- $372,000 was secured for the bow used by the character, Legolas (Orlando Bloom), in the Lord of The Rings trilogy at the Profiles in History December 2012 Hollywood Auction. In addition, the screen-used red chiffon "jump dress" sold for $330,000.
- $240,000 was received for the Harrison Ford "Han Solo" blaster from Star Wars; The Empire Strikes Back (December 2013).
- An original Stan Winston-created endoskeleton from Terminator 2: Judgment Day sold for $488,750.
- $420,000 was paid for the original Charlie Chaplin "Tramp" cane from the classic Modern Times (July 2013).
- The crystal ball the Wicked Witch used to watch Dorothy in The Wizard of Oz fetched $126,000, more than double the pre-sale estimate of $40,000 to $60,000.

The company is also known for auctions of iconic movie automobiles. In May 2011, Profiles in History sold the working Chitty Chitty Bang Bang car. The rare Delorean from Back to the Future Part III was sold in December 2011, while the Risky Business Porsche 928 prop car was sold in August 2012.

In July 2003, Profiles in History became the Guinness World Record holder for the most expensive Superman costume from the 1955 television series Adventures of Superman, sold at the auction for $129,800.

== See also ==
- List of film memorabilia
