= Black dress of Rita Hayworth =

Iconic dress worn by Rita Hayworth in the film Gilda

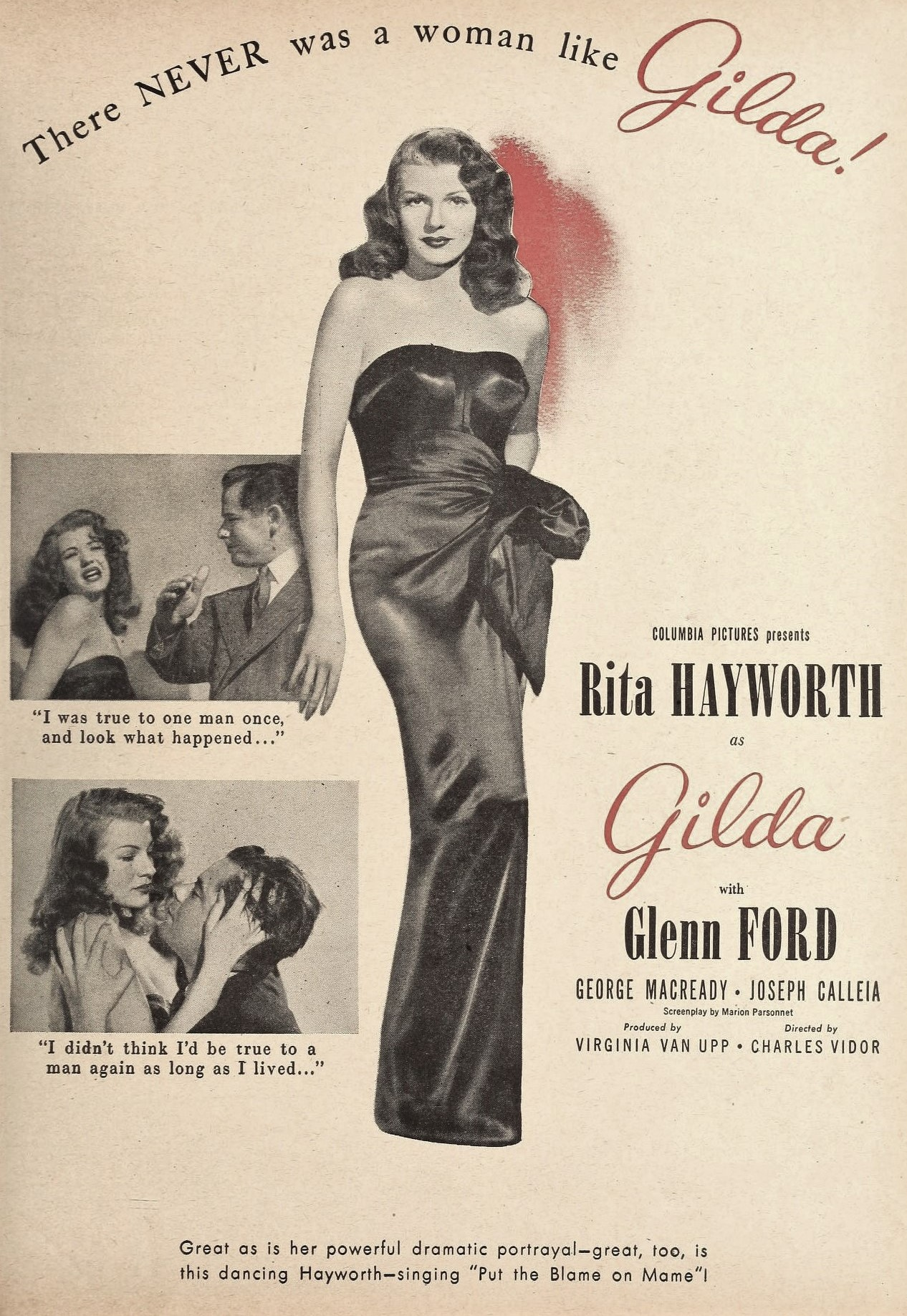
- Designer: Jean Louis
- Year: 1946
- Type: Black strapless dress
- Material: Satin

In the 1946 film Gilda, Rita Hayworth wore a black dress made by American costume designer Jean Louis. It was used in a scene in which the character of Gilda sings the song "Put the Blame on Mame", improvising a quick striptease, choreographed by Jack Cole. The dress has helped consolidate the image of the femme fatale, as well as being universally recognized as an icon of fashion and cinema. The Independent named it as one of the Ten Best Fashion Moments in Film.

== History ==
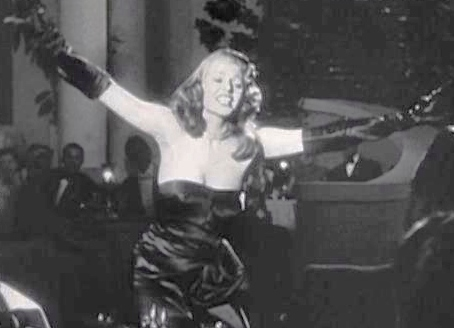
Hayworth performing "Put the Blame on Mame"

Jean Louis, Columbia Pictures costume designer, collaborated with the actress Rita Hayworth in nine films from the 1945 until 1959. Louis is considered "an essential ingredient in the formula that created the image of Rita Hayworth".

To create clothes for Gilda, Jean Louis was inspired by Portrait of Madame X, the famous socialite in Paris. According to Life magazine, the wardrobe designed by Jean Louis for Rita Hayworth had a value of about $60,000, a large figure for the time.

In 1946, the image of Rita Hayworth in the Gilda black dress was imprinted on the first nuclear bomb to be tested after the Second World War, as part of Operation Crossroads. The bomb, nicknamed "Gilda", was decorated with a photograph of Hayworth cut from the June 1946 issue of Esquire magazine. Above it was stenciled "Gilda" in two-inch black letters.

In April 2009, the dress was to be sold at the auction of the Forrest J. Ackerman estate. In the description of the lot it was specified that the dress still had the label "property of Columbia Pictures" and "Rita Hayworth" sewn inside. The initial price was estimated between $30,000 and $50,000, but the lot was withdrawn before it reached the auction. Later, in September 2009, the dress appeared mysteriously in an auction on eBay with a starting price of $30,000.

The scene with the black dress has been referenced in several films. Jessica Rabbit in the Disney film Who Framed Roger Rabbit, performs "Why Don't You Do Right?" similarly to Rita Hayworth in Gilda. For the 23rd James Bond film Skyfall (2012), costume designer Jany Temime referenced the dress while creating an outfit for Bond girl Sévérine.

== Design ==
The strapless dress is a sheath in black satin with a straight neckline, leaving the shoulders bare. In the scene in which it appears, the dress is paired with a pair of full length satin opera gloves.

To be able to wear the dress, Hayworth had to wear a corset, because just a few months prior she had given birth to her daughter and had not yet regained her pre-pregnancy figure. In addition to the dress, Jean Louis made a harness, worn under the dress. The harness consisted of stays—one in the centre and two on the sides. In addition, the soft plastic had been molded around the top of the dress.

== See also ==
- Black Givenchy dress of Audrey Hepburn
- Pink dress of Marilyn Monroe
- White dress of Marilyn Monroe
- List of film memorabilia
- List of individual dresses
