= William Travilla =

American costume designer (1920–1990)

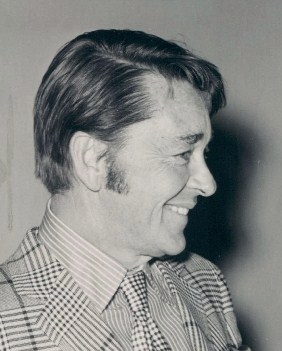
- Travilla in 1968
- Born: March 22, 1920; Los Angeles, California, U.S.
- Died: November 2, 1990 (aged 70); Los Angeles, California, U.S.
- Education: Chouinard Art Institute
- Alma mater: Woodbury University
- Occupation: Fashion designer
- Spouse: Dona Drake (m. 1944; died 1989)
- Children: 1

William Travilla (March 22, 1920 – November 2, 1990), known professionally as Travilla, was an American costume designer for theatre, film, and television. He is perhaps best known for designing costumes for Marilyn Monroe in eight of her films, as well as two of the most iconic dresses in cinematic history.

== Early life ==
Travilla was born and raised in Los Angeles. During adolescence, became interested in art and enrolled at Chouinard Art Institute in Los Angeles. When Travilla was sixteen, he began to frequent burlesque clubs in order to design the dancers' costumes. He sold pencil sketches of costume designs to the showgirls. After inheriting US$5,000 from his grandfather, Travilla used the money to travel. He spent a year in the South Seas and Tahiti, an area which influenced his art work and designs. After being designated 4F due to flat feet, Travilla enrolled at Woodbury University where he studied fashion designing. He graduated in 1941.

== Career ==
Upon graduating from Woodbury, Travilla began working at Western Costume in Hollywood as ghost-sketcher for studio designers. After a stint at Western, Travilla took a job designing at Jack's of Hollywood. At Jack's, he was given assignments working for ice skater and actress Sonja Henie as well as for United Artists and Columbia Pictures.

Travilla began selling Tahiti-inspired paintings at the popular tiki bar Don The Beachcomber. Actress Ann Sheridan began collecting Travilla's work and, shortly thereafter, requested that Warner Bros. hire Travilla as her personal costume designer. His designs for Sheridan were featured in the 1947 film noir Nora Prentiss. The film was a hit and Travilla was hired to design costumes for Sheridan in her next film, the 1948 Western Silver River. The 1949 movie The Inspector General starring Danny Kaye credits Travilla as well for the costumes.

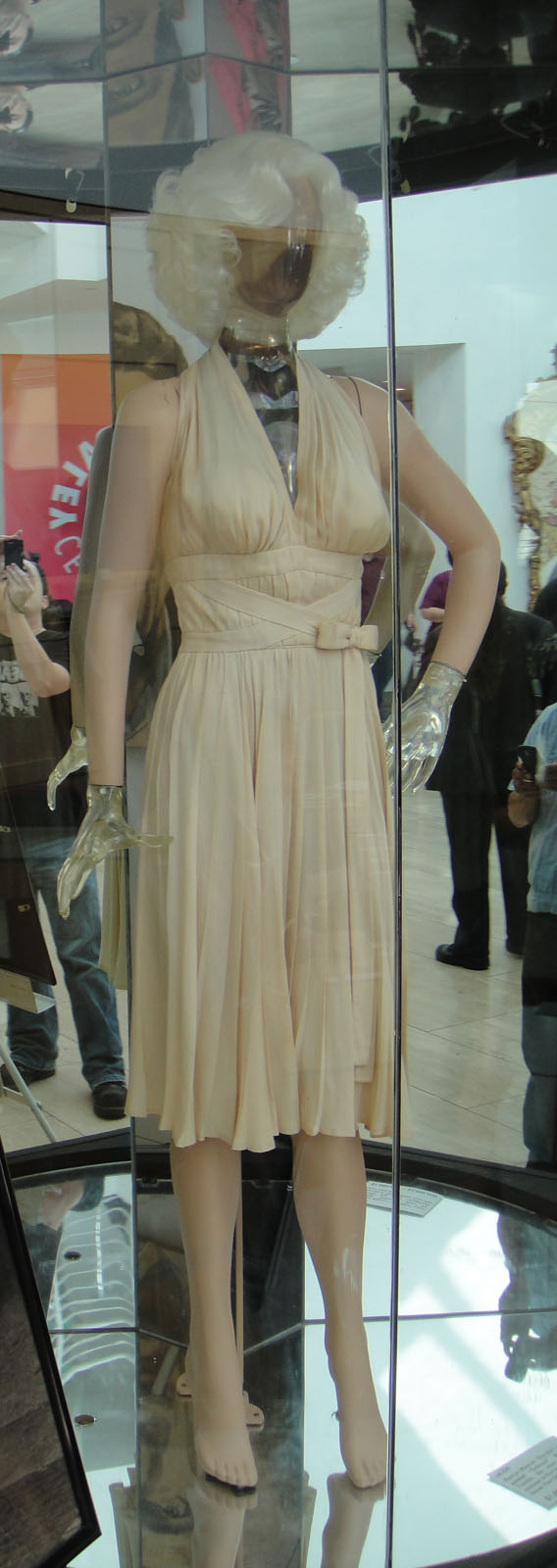
Design for Marilyn Monroe when she stands over the subway grating in The Seven Year Itch (1955).

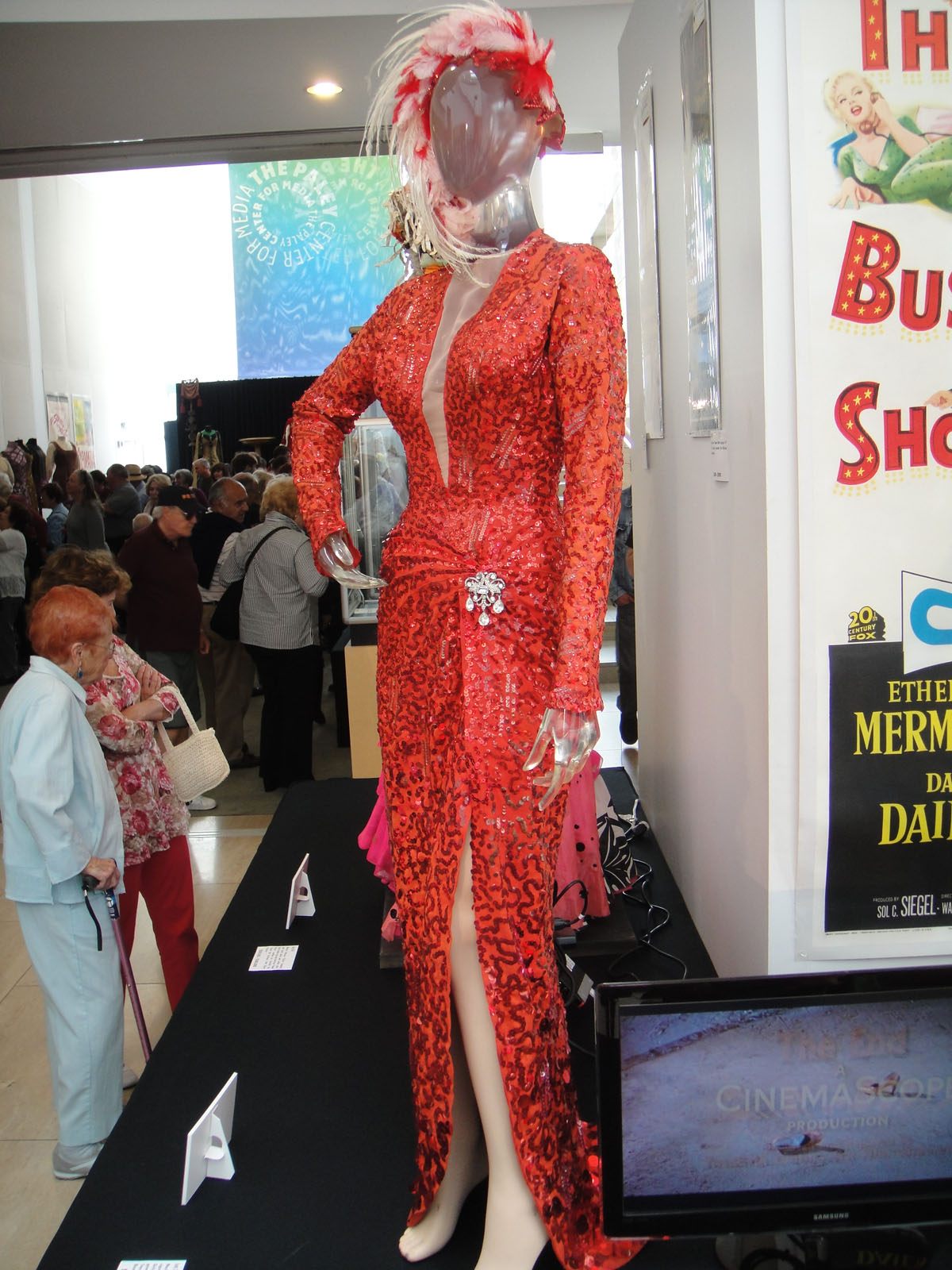
Design for Marilyn Monroe in Gentlemen Prefer Blondes (1953), for song "Two Little Girls from Little Rock".

After work on several B movies, Travilla worked his way upward through the studio until he earned an Oscar in 1949 for the Errol Flynn swashbuckler Adventures of Don Juan, and in 1951 designed the costumes in the now classic sci-fi tale of morality The Day the Earth Stood Still. He then worked mainly at Twentieth Century-Fox, where his credits included Elia Kazan's Viva Zapata!.

By 1952, Travilla had begun working with Marilyn Monroe and created the costumes for Don't Bother to Knock and Gentlemen Prefer Blondes. He went on to design the costumes for several more of her films. Travilla created one of the most famous costumes in all of film – the pleated ivory cocktail dress Monroe wore in the 1955 film The Seven Year Itch. Monroe is wearing it while standing on a New York City Subway ventilation grate; the dress rises up around her as a train passes below ground. Photographs of this scene have become synonymous with Monroe herself. The iconic dress, which was later purchased by actress Debbie Reynolds, sold for US$4,600,000 during a 2011 auction.

Besides winning his first Oscar, Travilla was also nominated for the Academy Award for How to Marry a Millionaire in 1953, There's No Business Like Show Business in 1954 and The Stripper in 1963.

In the late 1970s, Travilla began working mainly in television. One of his most widely seen latter-day projects was the TV mini-series The Thorn Birds in 1983. Travilla was nominated for Emmy Awards seven times for his work on television. In 1980, he won the Emmy for "Outstanding Costume Design for a Limited Series or a Special" for The Scarlett O'Hara War, and in 1985 he won the Primetime Emmy Award for "Outstanding Costumes for a Series" for his work on the television show Dallas. Travilla also designed several evening gowns for Lena Horne in the 1980s.

== Personal life ==
On August 19, 1944, Travilla married actress Dona Drake in Santa Monica, California. The couple had a daughter, Nia, in August 1951. Travilla and Drake separated in 1956 but remained legally married until Drake's death in 1989.

== Death and legacy ==
On November 2, 1990, Travilla died of lung cancer at Good Samaritan Medical Center in Los Angeles, California.

An exhibition of the personal collection of William Travilla began a world tour in 2008. The show began in England, then came to Los Angeles and in 2009 to Palm Springs, California. The collection includes gowns worn by Marilyn Monroe, Dorothy Dandridge, Dionne Warwick, Whitney Houston, Faye Dunaway, Judy Garland, Sharon Tate, Jane Russell, Betty Grable, Lana Turner, Diahann Carroll, Susan Hayward, Loretta Young, Joanne Woodward, Barbara Stanwyck and many other women in film and television, as well as his Oscar, patterns, sewing room artifacts and numerous original watercolor renderings of his costume designs.

== See also ==
- Forever Marilyn – a gigantic statue of Marilyn in the white dress over the subway grate created by Seward Johnson
