= Buyer's premium =

Fee

In auctions, the buyer's premium is a charge in addition to the hammer price (i.e. the winning bid announced) of an auction item, or lot. The winning bidder is required to pay both the hammer price and the percentage of that price called for by the buyer's premium. It is charged by the auctioneer in addition to the commission which has always been charged by auction houses to sellers. All of the buyer's premium is retained by the auction house and is not shared with the item's seller.

Major auction houses have levied the buyer's premium for several decades, particularly in fine art auctions, with percentages in the region of 10–30%. In real estate auctions in many European countries, the buyer's premium, if charged at all, is much less (2–2.5%). More recently in the UK, however, repossessed properties have been offered without fee to the seller, but with a buyer's premium of 10%.

The buyer's premium has been characterized by auction houses as a necessary contribution to the costs of the administrative process, although some in the auction-buying community see it as an unreasonable additional charge. While a few auction houses may market themselves as "not charging a premium" to gain favor with customers, this is now rare and the buyer's premium is commonplace with auction houses. However, small independent auctioneers in the US have been slow to adopt the buyer's premium.

The amount of the buyer's premium will normally be stated in the auction house terms and conditions. For UK properties, it is listed in the RICS (Royal Institute of Chartered Surveyors) Common Auction Conditions or in the special conditions for the lot.

In Europe, the buyer's premium may also be subject to VAT (value-added tax), while in the United States, most states require sales tax to be calculated on the amount of the premium since it is a component of the price being paid for the item.

== History ==
The buyer's premium was a feature in Roman auctions during the reign of Augustus, when buyers were required to pay a two percent tax on purchases. The modern buyer's premium was introduced at 10% by Christie's and Sotheby's in London in September 1975.

Percentages have varied widely, but have risen sharply with time. Early on, Christie's charged 14% in the Netherlands and Belgium, while Sotheby's charged 16% in Switzerland (10% to foreigners), 11% in Monaco and 16% in the Netherlands. There was no fee at Christie's sales in Australia and Sotheby Parke-Bernet auctions in South Africa. Christie's also charged no fees to buyers at its South Kensington house in London and at Edmiston in Glasgow. Christie's introduced a 10% fee to buyers in the United States when it opened at Park Avenue and 59th Street in May 1977. Sotheby's followed in January 1979.

Beginning on 1 January 1993, Sotheby's charged buyers 15% on goods sold for $100,000 or less. Amounts above that were charged at 10%. Christie's introduced the same price regime on 1 March 1993.

On 24 January 2003, Christie's raised commissions charged to buyers in New York, London and Geneva to 12% on amounts above $100,000, effective 1 March 2003. The premium charged to buyers on the first $100,000 was held at 19.5 percent. Sotheby's had raised its premium for sales above $100,000 to 12% two weeks earlier, and increased its commission on the first $100,000 to 20% from 19.5%. In London, that meant 20% on the first £70,000 and 12% on any amount above that.

Christie's announced on 15 February 2013 that it would raise buyer's premium effective 11 March 2013. The new premiums were 25% for the first $75,000; 20% on the next $75,001 to $1.5 million and 12% on the rest. Sotheby's followed suit on 28 February, announcing raised premiums effective 15 March 2013. Buyers in London, New York and France are charged 25% on the first $100,000 (£50,000; €30,000); 20% from $100,000 up to and including $2 million (£50,000 to £1,000,000; €30,000 to €1,200,000) and 12% on the remainder.

Christie's later announced an amendment to their premium increase effective 30 September 2013. This amendment applied 25% premium up to $100,000; 20% to the amount $100,001 to $2,000,000 and 12% to the remainder.

In 2017, Christie's changed its premiums again, increasing the rate on the highest prices to 12.5%, and denominating the price boundaries in local currencies. For London and New York (Dubai also using the dollar rates) respectively, the rates became 25% to £175,000/$250,000; 20% to £3,000,000/$4,000,000; and 12.5% over £3,000,000/$4,000,000. The Paris rates were notably more generous, with the same percentages but breaks at €150,000 and €2,000,000.
