= Film memorabilia =

Collectables associated with cinema

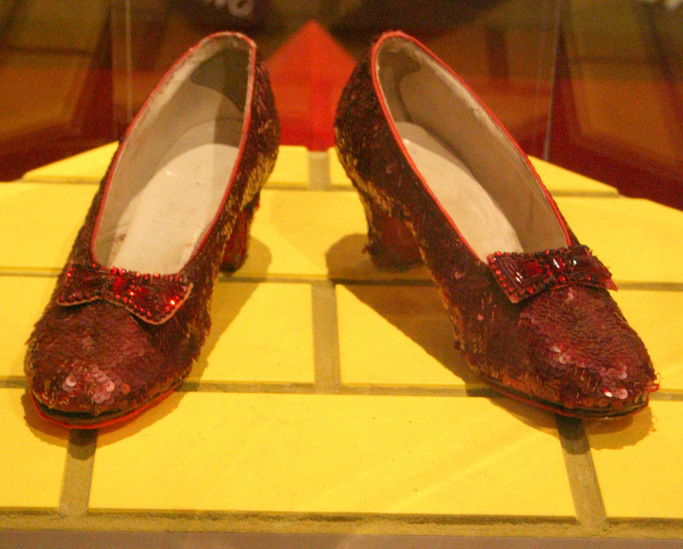
One pair of ruby slippers from The Wizard of Oz, on display at the National Museum of American History

Film memorabilia are objects considered of value because of their connection to the cinema. These include costumes, props, advertising posters, and scripts, among other things. Fans have long sought memorabilia, but in recent years what was once a hobby has grown into a major business, with millions of dollars changing hands in auctions held by firms such as Christie's and Sotheby's. In addition, collectible items from many popular films are sold through independent online memorabilia stores, web auctions, and film studio charity events.

== History of collecting ==
In the early days, most collectors sought autographs, original photographs or posters. Collectors relied on a handful of news magazines containing advertisements from sellers offering mail order catalogues and from buyers seeking bulk lots or particular items of interest. Occasionally, events were organized around a live auction; such events, though fewer in number today, still take place, and memorabilia can still be bought in person from trusted sellers on-site. The community was also fragmented, with collectors and dealers spread across the globe and no consistent or reliable means of communicating with one another.

Movie studios were slow to recognize the value of their property, "generally viewing the material as junk taking up precious backlot real estate." Workers often took souvenirs or sold items without permission, knowing that their employers were largely indifferent. One of the more notorious of these was costumer Kent Warner, who amassed a large private collection and made money selling to interested buyers. One of his friends claimed that Warner rescued Humphrey Bogart's Casablanca trench coat, which had been slated for burning.

=== 1970 MGM auction ===
The turning point came in 1970. Kirk Kerkorian had bought MGM the year before and installed James Thomas Aubrey, Jr. as president. As part of his cost-cutting measures, Aubrey decided to auction off hundreds of thousands of items. The success of the event attracted widespread attention.

MGM sold the contents of seven sound stages "for a mere $1.5 million" to auctioneer David Weisz. There were over 350,000 costumes alone. Weisz hired Kent Warner to help catalog and prepare for the auction. In the course of his work, Warner found several pairs of the ruby slippers from The Wizard of Oz (it is common practice to make multiple copies of important props). One pair became the centerpiece of the event and sold for $15,000, an unprecedented sum at the time. Warner kept or sold an unknown number of other pairs.

Actress Debbie Reynolds spent $180,000 and "purchased thousands of items", the beginning of her large collection. Weisz "recouped eight times" what he paid "from eager nostalgia enthusiasts."

Among the items sold were:

- the Cowardly Lion costume from The Wizard of Oz
- the time machine from the 1960 film The Time Machine
- the 82-inch (210 cm) and 22-inch (56 cm) (diameter) models of the "United Planets Cruiser C-57D" from Forbidden Planet
- Johnny Weissmuller's Tarzan loincloth
- the paddle steamer built for the 1951 version of the musical Show Boat

Of the unsold items, "... truckloads of costume sketches, movie stills and other memorabilia were sent to the MGM Grand Hotel in Las Vegas to be sold in the gift shop and used as hotel decorations." The auction catalogs have themselves become sought-after collectibles.

=== 2011 Debbie Reynolds auctions ===
Debbie Reynolds' collection was sold by Profiles in History in two auctions in June and December 2011. The items put up for bid in the first of these auctions included:

- Marilyn Monroe's "subway dress", whose skirt is raised by the updraft of a passing subway train in The Seven Year Itch.
- one of Charlie Chaplin's trademark bowler hats
- an early, unused Arabian motif version of the ruby slippers from The Wizard of Oz
- Audrey Hepburn's Ascot dress and hat from My Fair Lady
- Charlton Heston's tunic, robe, and accessories from Ben-Hur

On June 18, 2011, the subway dress sold for $4.6 million, far in excess of pre-auction estimates of $1–2 million. Another Monroe dress, worn in Gentlemen Prefer Blondes, fetched $1.2 million; it had been expected to go for $200,000 to $300,000. Estimated at $60,000 to $80,000, a blue cotton dress Judy Garland used in test shots for The Wizard of Oz went for $910,000. In total, the auction grossed $22.8 million.

In the second Reynolds auction, on December 3, 2011, a still-functioning Panavision PSR 35mm camera used to film Star Wars went for $625,000, breaking records for Star Wars memorabilia and vintage cameras.

== Influence of the internet ==
In the early days of the internet, collectors began to communicate with one another through UseNet newsgroups (for example, alt.binaries.pictures.movie-posters). As the internet grew, new means of communication became available to collectors. In 1995, the on-line email group MoPo was formed, providing a central place for news and events of interest to the community. This group continues to provide information to new and old collectors alike.

By 1997, the community had changed. eBay had become an alternative marketplace after two years of steady growth. Many professional sellers closed their bricks-and-mortar businesses to focus on internet sales.

In the early days of internet selling, prices varied widely. The market for film memorabilia has since largely stabilised. Although rare film posters can sell for large sums, items are commonly priced at or near market value, or are bid up to that point.

While the Internet has broadened access to legitimate memorabilia, it has also created opportunities for the sale of fakes, such as replicas sold as originals and forged signatures. The prevalence of such scams has led some actors, such as Star Wars's Mark Hamill, to raise awareness of the problem.

The internet has also given buyers access to established auction houses and to authentication services such as the JSA and the PSA, which issue certificates of authenticity for acquired items as reassurance for buyers.

== Types ==
- Film posters
- Lobby cards
- Still photos
- Autographs
- Film props
- Costumes
- Pressbooks and press kits
- Programmes
- Heralds
- Glass slides
- Industry magazines and related material
- Scripts, storyboards, and original concept art
- Promotional material of any kind
- Commercial collectibles

== Notable examples ==
- Several pairs of the ruby slippers from The Wizard of Oz are known to exist. One pair is on permanent display at the National Museum of American History, several others are in the hands of private collectors, and one pair was stolen in 2005. The last auction price, in 2000, was $666,000. Also, the black hat belonging to the Wicked Witch of the West sold for $33,000 in 1988 and $197,400 in 2008.
- There were several statuettes made for the 1941 The Maltese Falcon — two lead figures weighing 47 pounds (21 kg) each, and a seven-pound (3.2 kg), more finely crafted, resin model — all handled by Humphrey Bogart. Christie's auctioned one of the lead figures, part of the estate of actor William Conrad, on December 6, 1994; it was purchased for $398,500 by Ronald Winston, president of Harry Winston, Inc. Within two years, Winston had resold the prop "at an enormous profit" — for as much as $1 million — to an unknown European collector. On November 25, 2013, Bonhams, in association with TCM, sold the other lead figure, the only one confirmed to have appeared in the movie, for over $4 million, including the buyers fee. This version has a prop number WB 90067. (See also The Maltese Falcon.)
- On November 24, 2014, the piano on which Sam plays "As Time Goes By" in Rick's Café Américain (and in which Rick hides the letters of transit) in Casablanca was sold for $2,900,000 (the buyer's premium bringing the total to $3,413,000) by Bonhams in New York City. In the same auction, the only known surviving copy of the transit papers, though apparently not used onscreen, went for $118,750 (including buyer's premium).
- Audrey Hepburn was not only a celebrated actress, but also a fashion icon. In 2006, her "little black dress" from Breakfast at Tiffany's (plus a few other minor items) fetched £467,200 ($923,187) for the City of Joy Foundation.
- Steven Spielberg paid $60,500 (including 10% commission) in June 1982 for a "Rosebud" sled from Citizen Kane. Orson Welles stated in a telephone interview that there were three made of balsa (as is Spielberg's purchase) that were intended to be burned in the final scene, and one made of hardwood for the beginning of the film. On December 15, 1996, the hardwood sled was sold to an anonymous bidder in Los Angeles for $233,500.
- The white suit worn by John Travolta in Saturday Night Fever was purchased by film critic Gene Siskel in a charity auction. In June 1995 it was auctioned at Christie's for $145,500.
