= White dress of Marilyn Monroe =

Dress worn by Marilyn Monroe in The Seven Year Itch

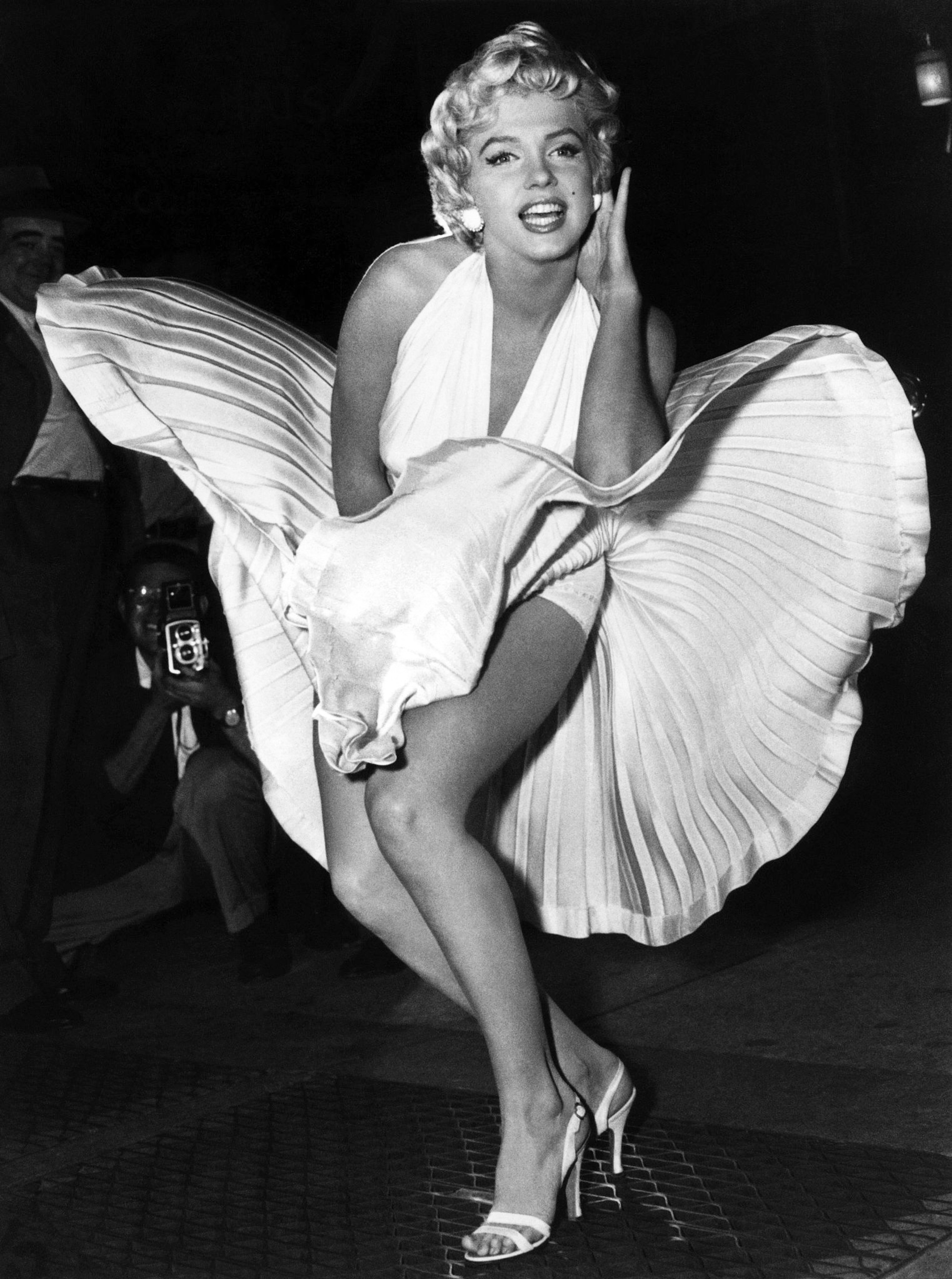
- Designer: William Travilla
- Year: 1954
- Type: White ivory cocktail dress

Marilyn Monroe wore a white dress in the 1955 film The Seven Year Itch, directed by Billy Wilder. It was created by costume designer William Travilla and worn in the movie's best-known scene. The image of it and her above a windy subway grating has been described as one of the most iconic images of the 20th century.

== History ==
Costume designer William Travilla, known as Travilla, won an Oscar for his work in The Adventures of Don Juan in 1948. In 1952, at 20th Century Fox, he began working with Monroe for the film Don't Bother to Knock. He designed her clothes for eight films and said they had a brief affair. In 1954, while his wife Dona Drake was on vacation, he designed the white cocktail dress Monroe wore. According to the book Hollywood Costume: Glamour! Glitter! Romance! by Dale McConathy and Diana Vreeland, he instead bought it off the rack. He denied this.

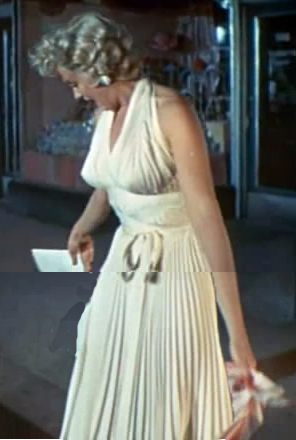
Monroe stands with a white dress in the theatrical trailer of the 1955 film The Seven Year Itch.

The dress appears in the sequence of The Seven Year Itch in which Monroe (playing "the Girl") and costar Tom Ewell ("Richard Sherman") exit the Trans-Lux 52nd Street Theatre on Lexington Avenue in New York City, having just watched Creature from the Black Lagoon. When they hear a subway train passing below the sidewalk grate, she steps on it and asks "Ooh, do you feel the breeze from the subway?" as the wind blows the dress up, exposing her legs.

The scene was scheduled to shoot on the street outside the Trans-Lux at 1:00 am on September 15, 1954. Monroe and the movie cameras caught the curiosity of hundreds of fans, so director Billy Wilder reshot the moment on a set at 20th Century Fox. The scene was compared to a similar event in the 1901 short film, What Happened on Twenty-third Street, New York City. The leg shot was called one of the iconic images of the entire 20th century.

After Monroe's death in 1962, Travilla kept the dress locked up with many of the costumes he made for her, to the point the collection was rumored lost. After he died in 1990, the clothes were displayed by his colleague Bill Sarris. It joined the private collection of Hollywood memorabilia owned by Debbie Reynolds at the Hollywood Motion Picture Museum. During an interview with Oprah Winfrey, Reynolds said the dress was the color ecru, "because as you know it is very very old now". In 2011, she said she would sell the entire collection at a staged auction, beginning on June 18. It was predicted to sell for between $1 and $2 million, but made $5.6 million (including a $1 million commission), making it one of the most valuable dresses.

A similar dress, also by Travilla, was worn by actress Roxanne Arlen in the 1962 film Bachelor Flat.

== Design ==
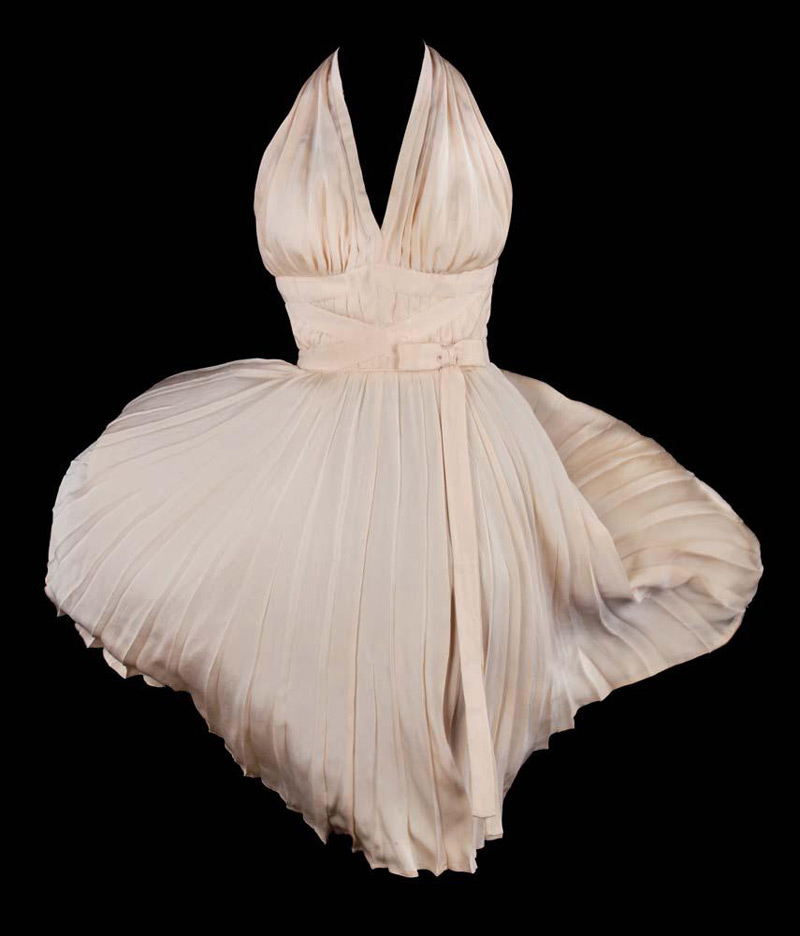
The light-colored ivory cocktail dress

The dress is a light-colored ivory cocktail dress in a style that was in vogue in the 1950s and 1960s. The halter-like bodice has a plunging neckline and is made of two pieces of softly pleated cellulose acetate (then considered a type of rayon) fabric that come together behind the neck, leaving the wearer's arms, shoulders and back bare. The halter is attached to a band situated immediately under the breasts. The dress fits closely from there to the natural waistline. A soft and narrow self belt was wrapped around the torso, criss-crossing in front and then tied into a small neat bow at the waist, at the front on the left side. Below the waistband is a softly pleated skirt that reaches to mid-calf or below the calf length. There is a zipper at the back of the bodice, and tiny buttons at the back of the halter.

== Reception ==
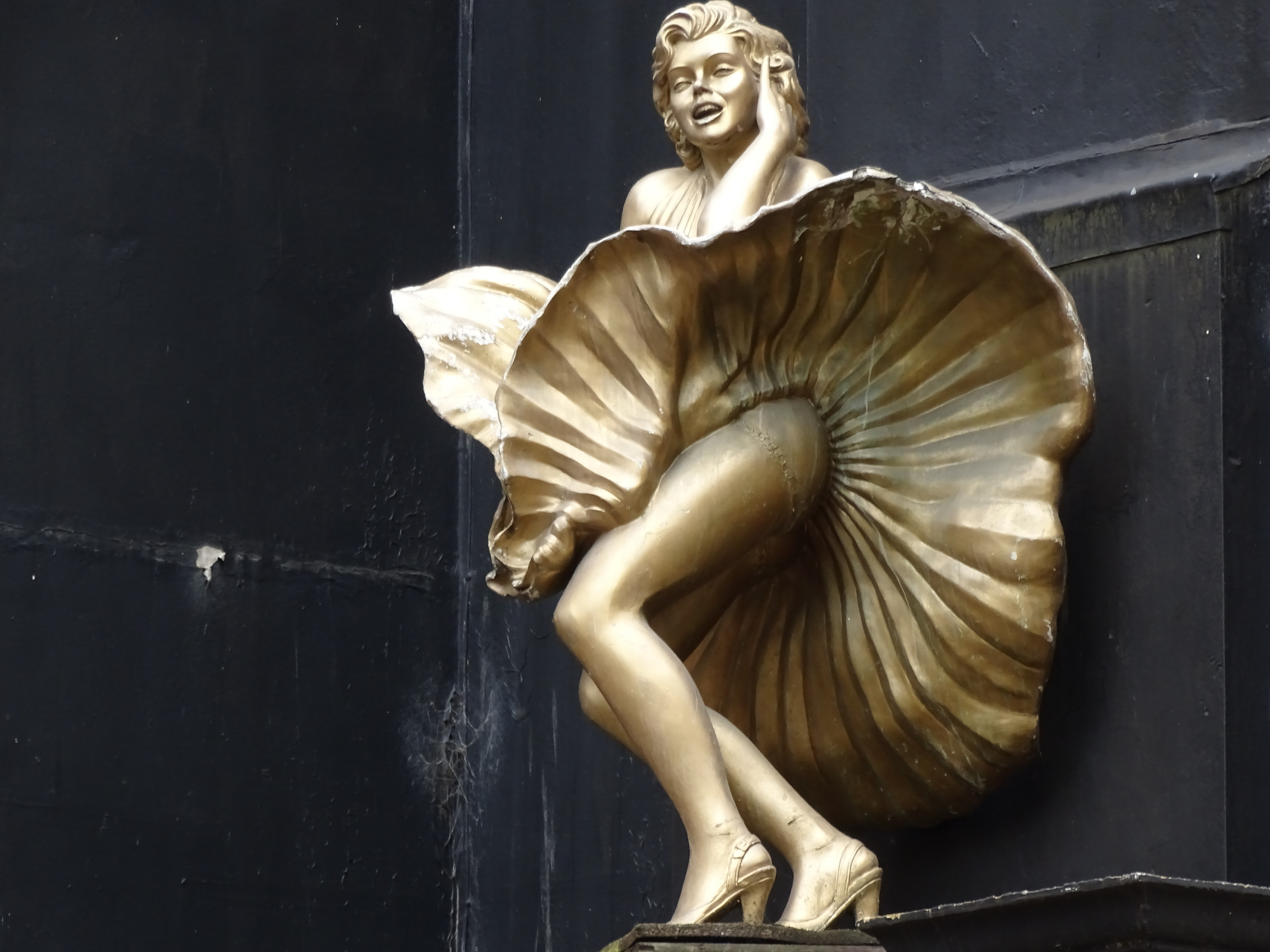
Monroe sculpture in Birmingham, England

Monroe's husband at the time the movie was filmed, Joe DiMaggio, is said to have "hated" the dress, but it is a popular element of Monroe's legacy. In the years following Monroe's death, images of her wearing the white dress were shown in many of the imitations, representations, and posthumous depictions of the actress. As an example, a full-sized plaster likeness of Monroe in this dress was featured in a key scene in the Ken Russell film of the Who's Tommy (1975). It has been emulated into the late 20th and throughout the 21st century in cinema, worn by Fiona in Shrek 2 (2004), by Amy Poehler in Blades of Glory (2007), and Anna Faris in The House Bunny (2008), among others. In the film The Woman in Red (1984), Kelly Le Brock repeats the same scene, but wearing a red dress. The white Marc Bouwer dress of Angelina Jolie that was worn to the 76th Academy Awards, which has often been cited as one of the best Oscars dresses of all time, was inspired by Monroe's. Glamour magazine website has classified the dress as one of history's most famous dresses. A similar survey conducted by Cancer Research UK voted the dress number one of all-time iconic celebrity fashion moments.

== See also ==
- Forever Marilyn – a gigantic statue of Marilyn in the dress standing over the subway grate by Seward Johnson
- Pink dress of Marilyn Monroe
- Black dress of Rita Hayworth
- Black Givenchy dress of Audrey Hepburn
- List of film memorabilia
- List of individual dresses
- List of photographs considered the most important
