= Sheath dress =

Type of dress designed to fit close to the body, relatively unadorned

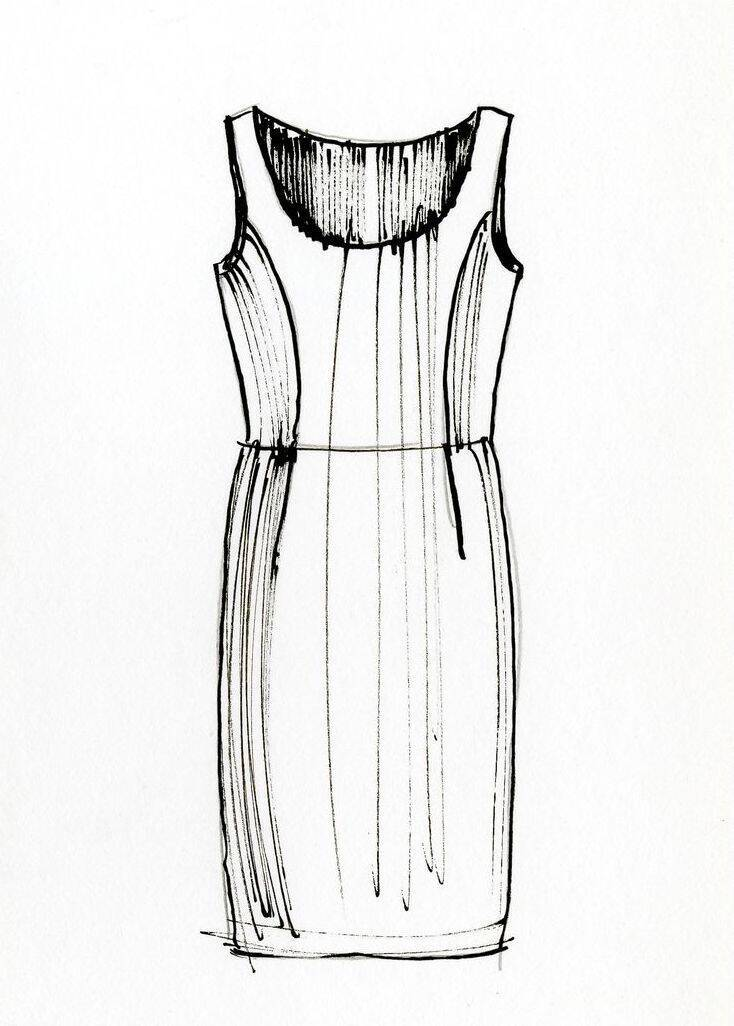
Sheath dress

In fashion, a sheath dress is a fitted, straight cut dress, often nipped at the waistline with no waist seam. When constructing the dress, the bodice and skirt are joined together by combining the skirt darts into one dart: this aligns the skirt darts with the bodice waist dart. The dress emphasizes the waist as its skirt portion is fitted. While the sheath dress can come in many patterns and lengths, it often is worn with short sleeves and reaches knee length.

== Ancient Egypt ==
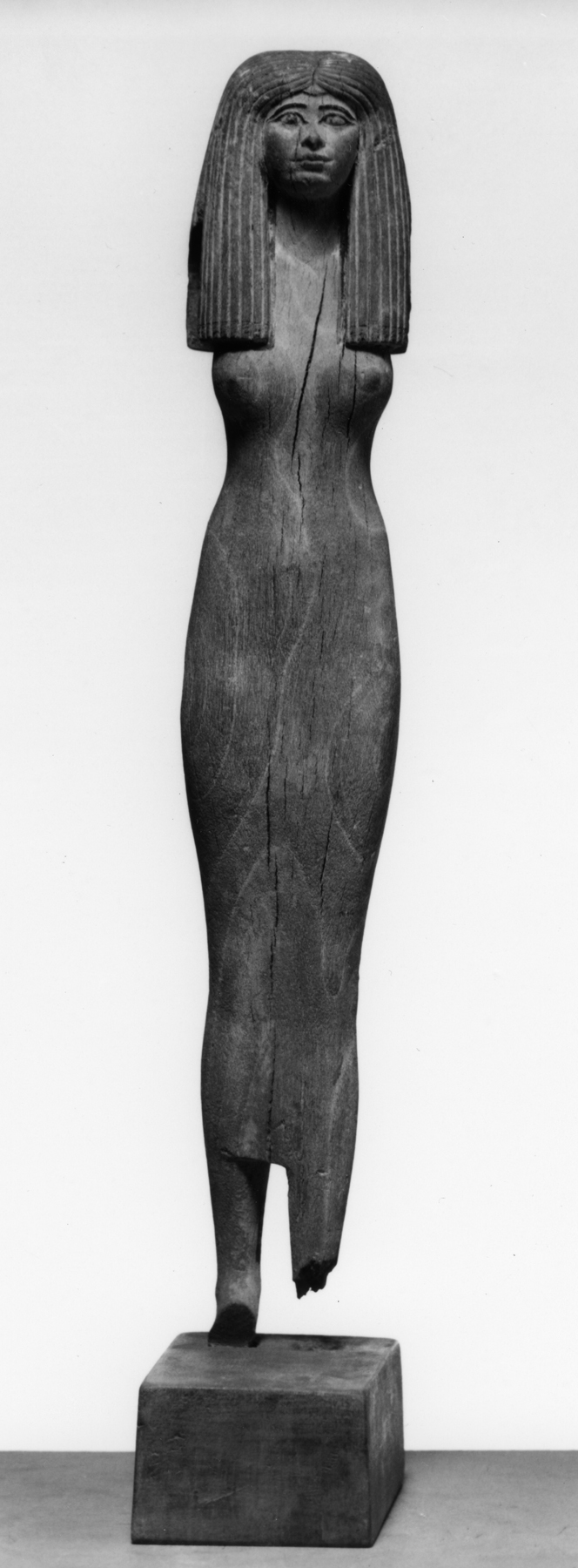
Egyptian - Female Tomb Figure - Walters 2215

Originating in the ancient world, the sheath dress is commonly seen in Egyptian art. Presented as slender and youthful, artistic renditions of the women in the garment were common prior to the New Kingdom. Although there was no archeological evidence of a sheath dress among the elite, women and deities are shown wearing the garment in tomb drawings. The garment was often presented with a seam under the breast and with beads. Ancient depictions of elite women showed the dress paired with the tripartite wig and vulture headdress. With archaeologists finding nearly twenty dresses of the ancient Egyptian world, there is no record of the dress ever existing in reality. Instead, scholars have hypothesized that the sheath dress as we know it were wrap dresses with straps, skirts, or a V neck dress.

== 19th century ==
The Princess Sheath dress was popular between 1878 and 1880. It was associated with the Princess of Wales, later known as Queen Alexandra. The Princess sheath is constructed with the bodice and skirt cut in one with a gored skirt. The dress was worn without a bustle but with a small pad. To tighten the front of the dress, ribbons were attached in the back's interior.

== 20th century ==
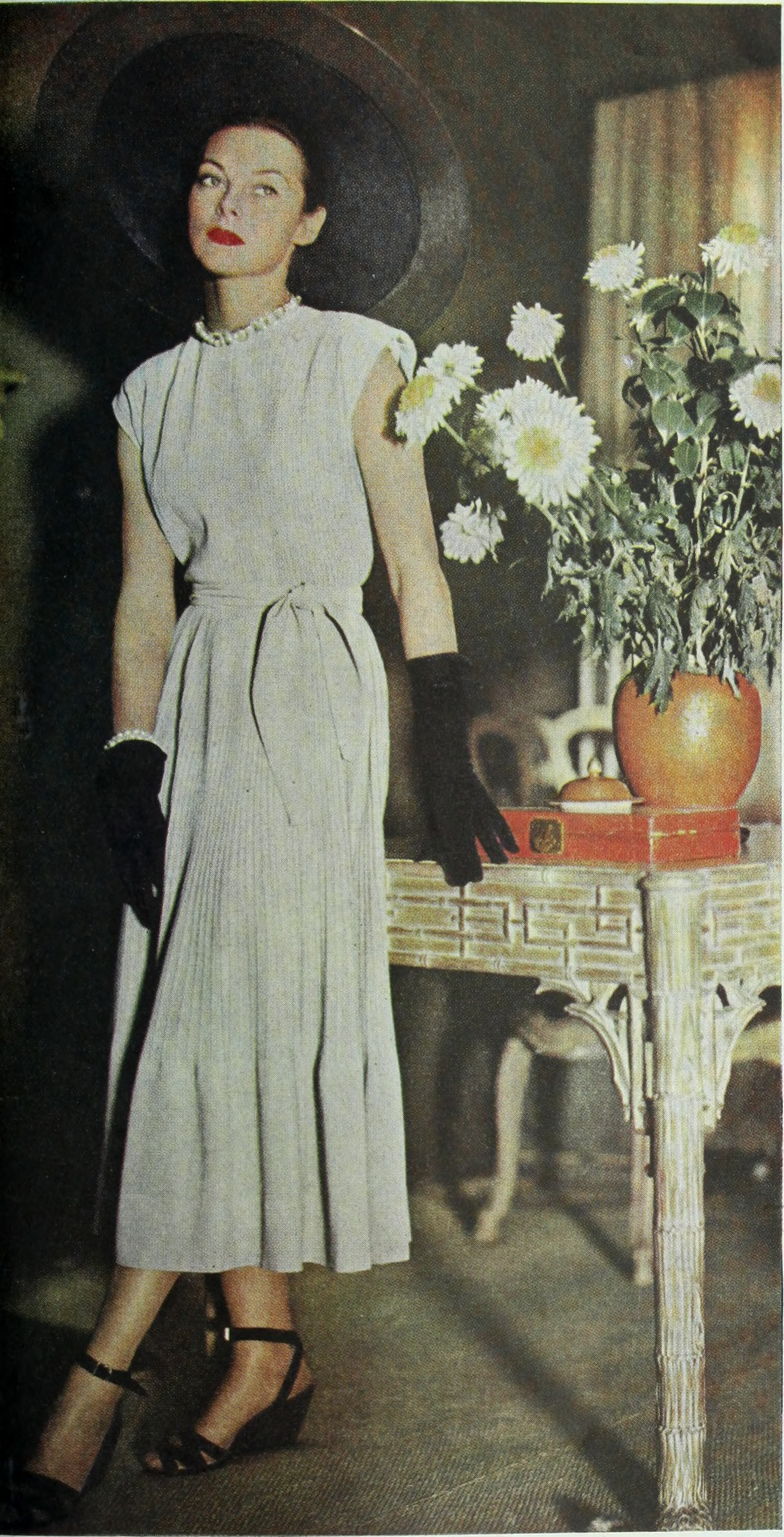
Ladies' Home Journal (1948)

During the early 1900s, Americans were still looking to Paris for the latest trends. American socialites traveled to Europe to view collections and receive custom outfits. Paul Poiret is credited as the first designer of the modern sheath dress. In doing so, he also created a rubber girdle as an alternative to the boned corset to wear under the dress. In great contrast to the emphasized curves of Victorian era and earlier dress, the sheath dress offered a sleek look that revealed the legs and lower torso with a slit. The style of the sheath dress reached the United States in 1908. That fall, the musical Bandanna Land included the song "Sheath Gown in Darktown", whose chorus mentions a "sheath gown":

Oh there's trouble down in Old Darktown,
Since Bella came with that sheath gown,
Imported walk and smile, and all that foreign style,
And all the girls are badly hurt as they watch her flirt that see-more skirt.
The sheath gown it's got Darktown, and will hold it for a while.

=== 1950s ===
By the 1950s, the sheath dress became the modern look for American women. In 1950, Christian Dior introduced the "Vertical Line". The line catered to a woman's body and her curves in comparison to previous years. From the line, Vogue called the sheath dress the "most important single day fashion". In 1956, a girdle sales manager remarked “The sheath paid for my house in Westport.” Pattern companies sold sheath cuts up to size 22 ½ and 41 inch bust size. The dress was referred to as “the slim look for five o’clock on”. For a casual look, the sheath dress was matched with a short sleeve print bolero. As a business attire, a box jacket when over the bolero as well as the dress. As the cut of the dress became easier to construct, textures were added to the dress such as beads.

=== 1960s ===
One of the most notable sheath dresses of all time is the black Givenchy dress of Audrey Hepburn. In 1961, Hepburn wore a Hubert de Givenchy black sheath dress in the film Breakfast at Tiffany's. By this time, her dress became known as the little black dress. On May 19, 1962, Marilyn Monroe sang happy birthday to then president John F. Kennedy for his 45th birthday. At the event, Monroe wore a Jean Louis sheath dress that is described as "skin and beads". The dress was made nude toned, backless, and clad with crystals. Monroe was sewn into the dress for a tight fit. In 2016, the Jean Louis design sold for $4.8 million.

== 21st century ==
In recent years, the sheath dress is worn as a cocktail dress. Sheath dresses are popular as wedding dresses, recommended for slim brides who are either tall or petite.

=== 2020s ===
The sheath dress is a basic element of MAGA women's style. In particular, it is often worn by Melania, Ivanka, Lara, and Tiffany Trump, Bettina Anderson, Kimberly Guilfoyle, Kristi Noem, and Alina Habba. Their preferred colors are red, white, blue, and sometimes pink. Sheath dresses are also popular among Fox News presenters, "the closest thing Fox News has to a uniform".

== Gallery ==
Sheath dresses

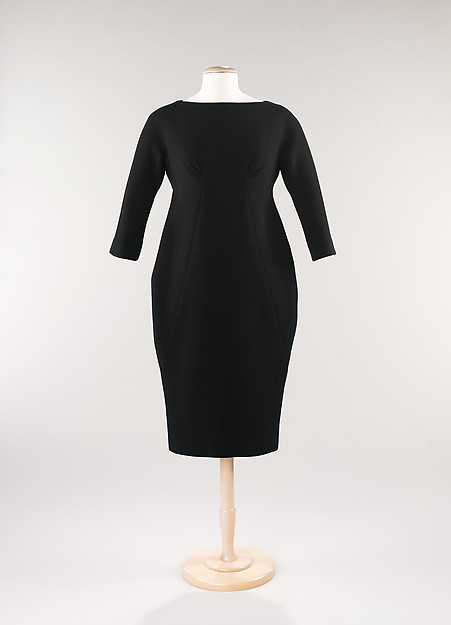
1959 Sheath Dress by James Galanos

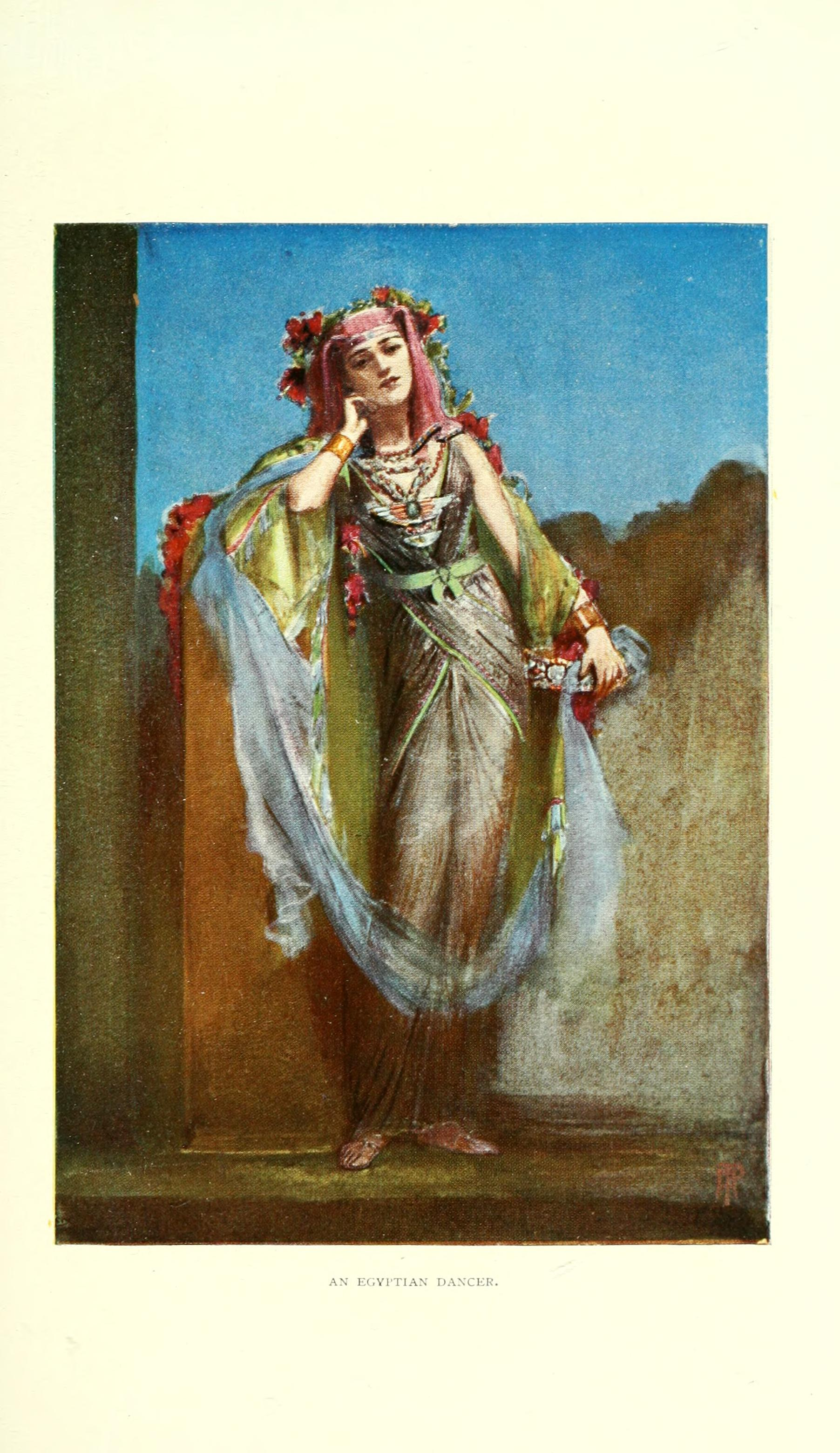
Portrait of an Egyptian dancer

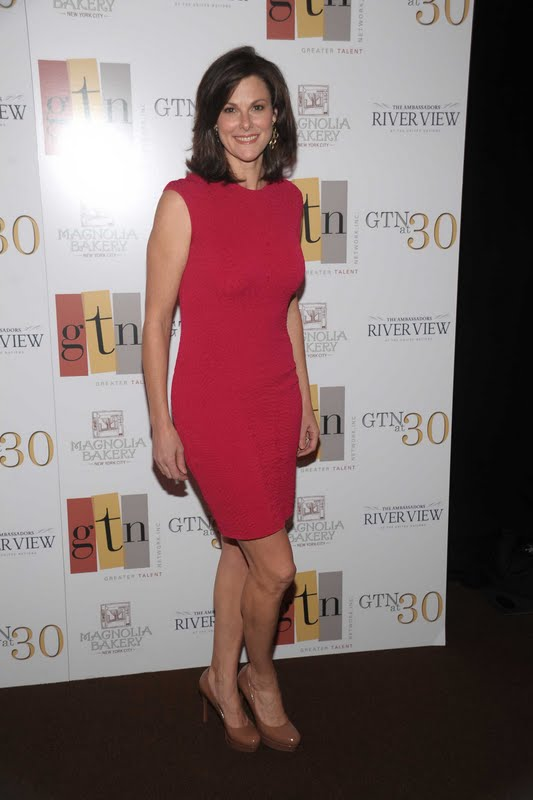
Campbell Brown of CNN in a sheath dress

== See also ==
- Cocktail dress
