= White floral Givenchy dress of Audrey Hepburn =

Dress that Audrey Hepburn wore to the 1954 Academy Awards

- Designer: Givenchy
- Year: 1954
- Type: White floral dress

Audrey Hepburn wore a white floral Givenchy dress to the Academy Awards in 1954, at which she won an Academy Award for her performance in Roman Holiday. The dress is now regarded as one of the classic dresses of the 20th century.

== History ==
Audrey Hepburn was a close friend of French designer Hubert de Givenchy, referring to the designer as her "best friend" while he called her a "sister". They originally met in 1953 during shooting for the film Sabrina, when Hepburn went to Paris to acquire an authentic Paris couture dress by Balenciaga for her role. Balenciaga turned her away, advising her to visit his former pupil, Givenchy had expected to meet a different actress named Hepburn, but was won over by Audrey. This led to a lasting professional association, which would see Hepburn wearing Givenchy for seven of her most outstanding movies, as well as regularly wearing his clothes off-screen. The belted white floral dress she wore for the 26th annual Academy Awards was the first time audiences saw Hepburn in one of Givenchy's creations.

== Design ==
The white dress had a floral pattern and tight white belt which showed off Hepburn's very slim waistline. It featured a bateau or boat neckline, considered unusual for an Oscar dress.

== Reception ==
The dress, like Hepburn's later little black dress in the 1961 film Breakfast at Tiffany's, is cited as one of the classic dresses of the 20th century. A poll by Debenhams, published in the Daily Telegraph, voted it the second most iconic red carpet dress of all time. Time magazine voted the dress the greatest Oscar dress of all time. Variety magazine's Complete Book of Oscar Fashion placed it among their selections for the Oscar's most beautiful gowns with the header "It's a Cinch!"

== See also ==
- List of individual dresses
