= Cigarette holder =

Fashion accessory held for smoking

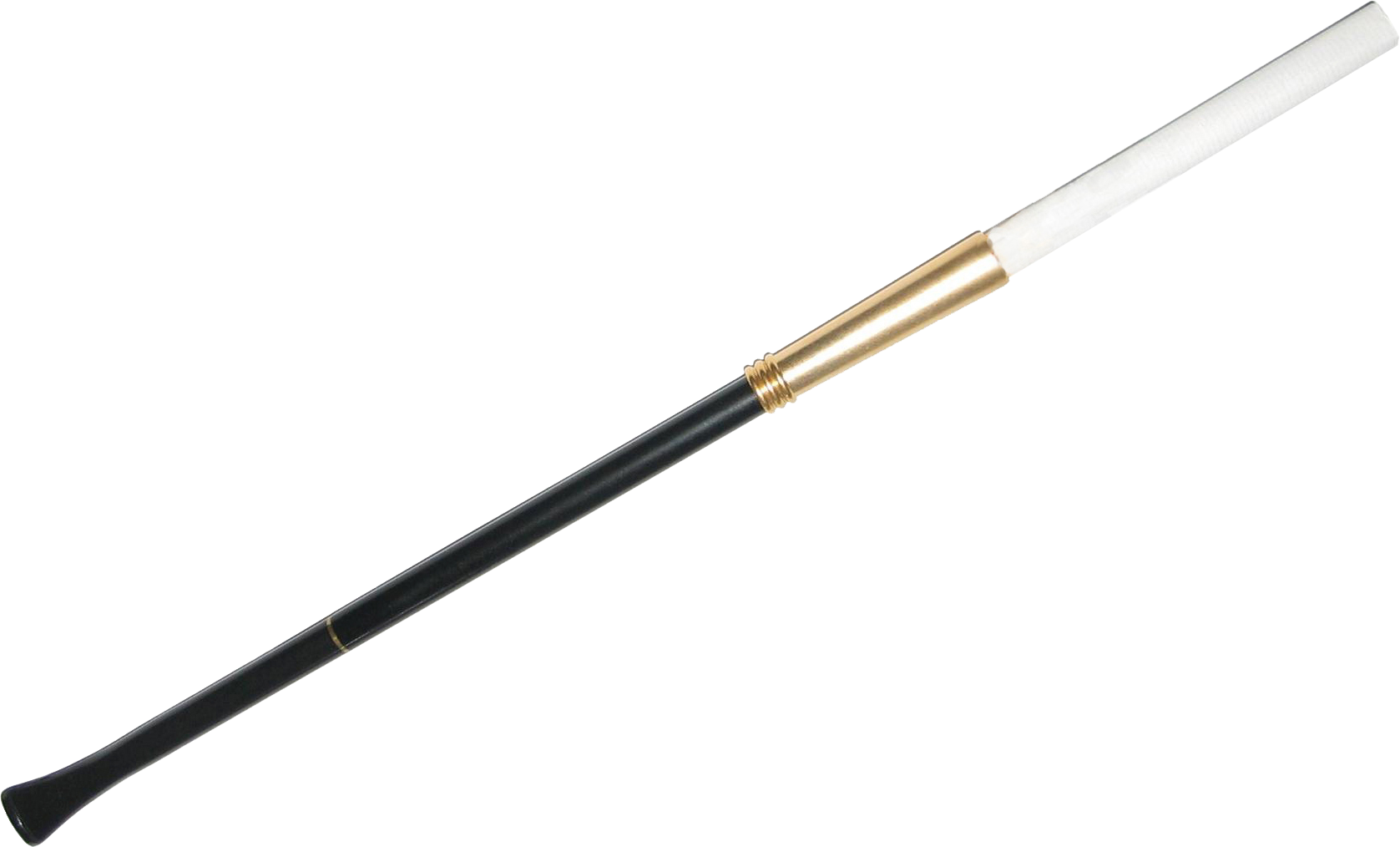
- Type: Fashion accessory
- Material: Silver, jade, or plastic

A cigarette holder is a fashion accessory, a slender tube in which a cigarette is held for smoking. Most frequently made of silver, jade or bakelite (popular in the past but now wholly replaced by modern plastics), cigarette holders were considered an essential part of ladies' fashion from the early 1910s through early to the mid 1970s.

== Purpose ==
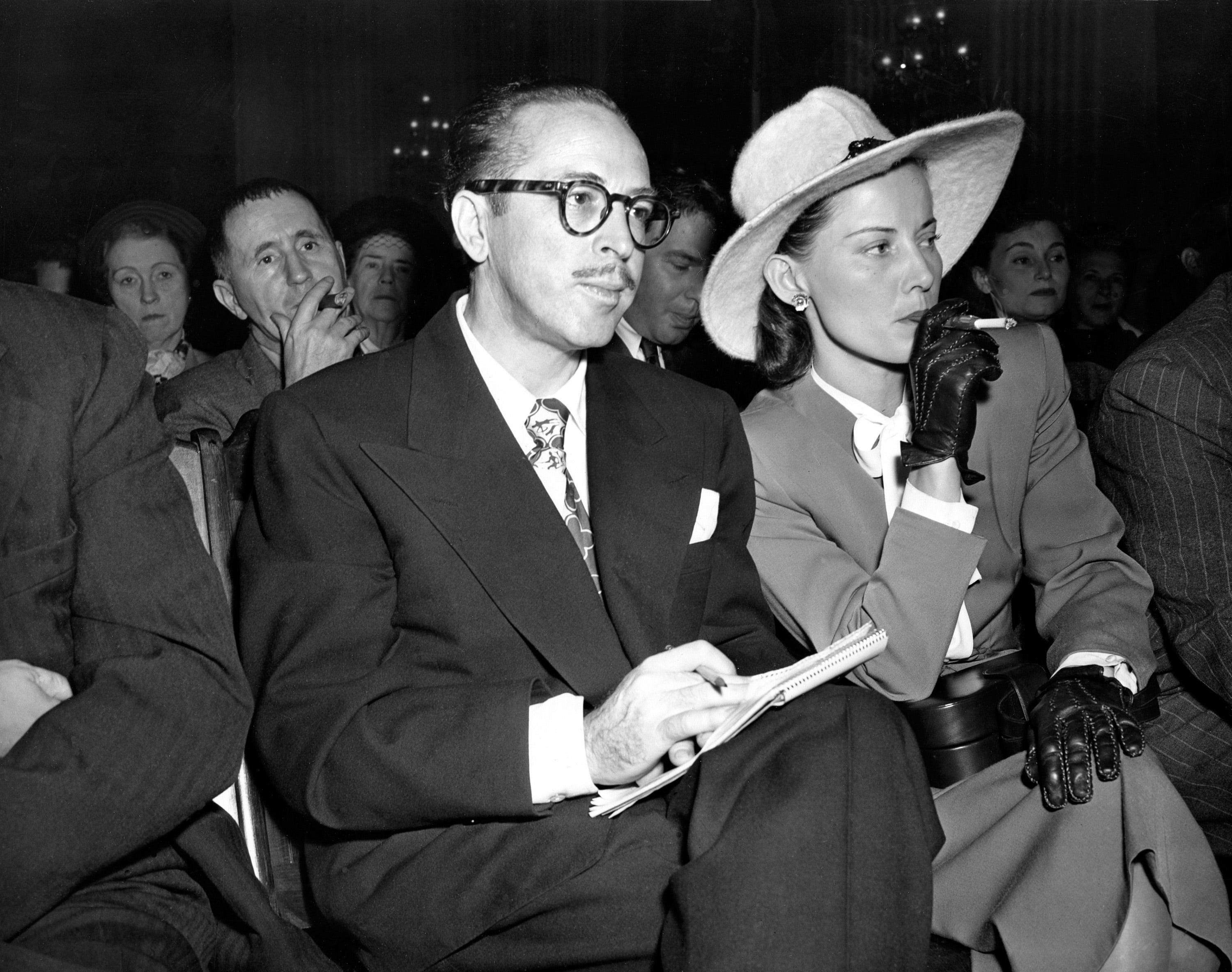
Cleo Trumbo, wife of novelist Dalton Trumbo, smokes with a holder during House Un-American Activities Committee hearings in 1947

The holder was a practical accessory with several purposes. The chief use was to prevent ash from falling onto a woman's clothes, especially since women did not wear smoking jackets. This is also why longer holders were for more formal occasions, which often had more elaborate dress codes. Holders also prevented nicotine from staining the fingers and gloves, as well as keeping side-stream smoke further from the smoker's eyes and out from under a lady's hat, which often had a wider brim than a man's.

Cigarette holders also served to enhance the experience of smoking. The length of the holder cooled and mellowed the inhaled smoke, helped keep tobacco flakes out of the smoker's mouth, and reduced staining of the teeth. The non-porous materials of holders were also more convenient, as these did not stick to a smoker's lips as cigarette paper often could. Some holders also contained a filter for taste and, later, perceived health benefits.

== Appearance ==
=== Materials ===
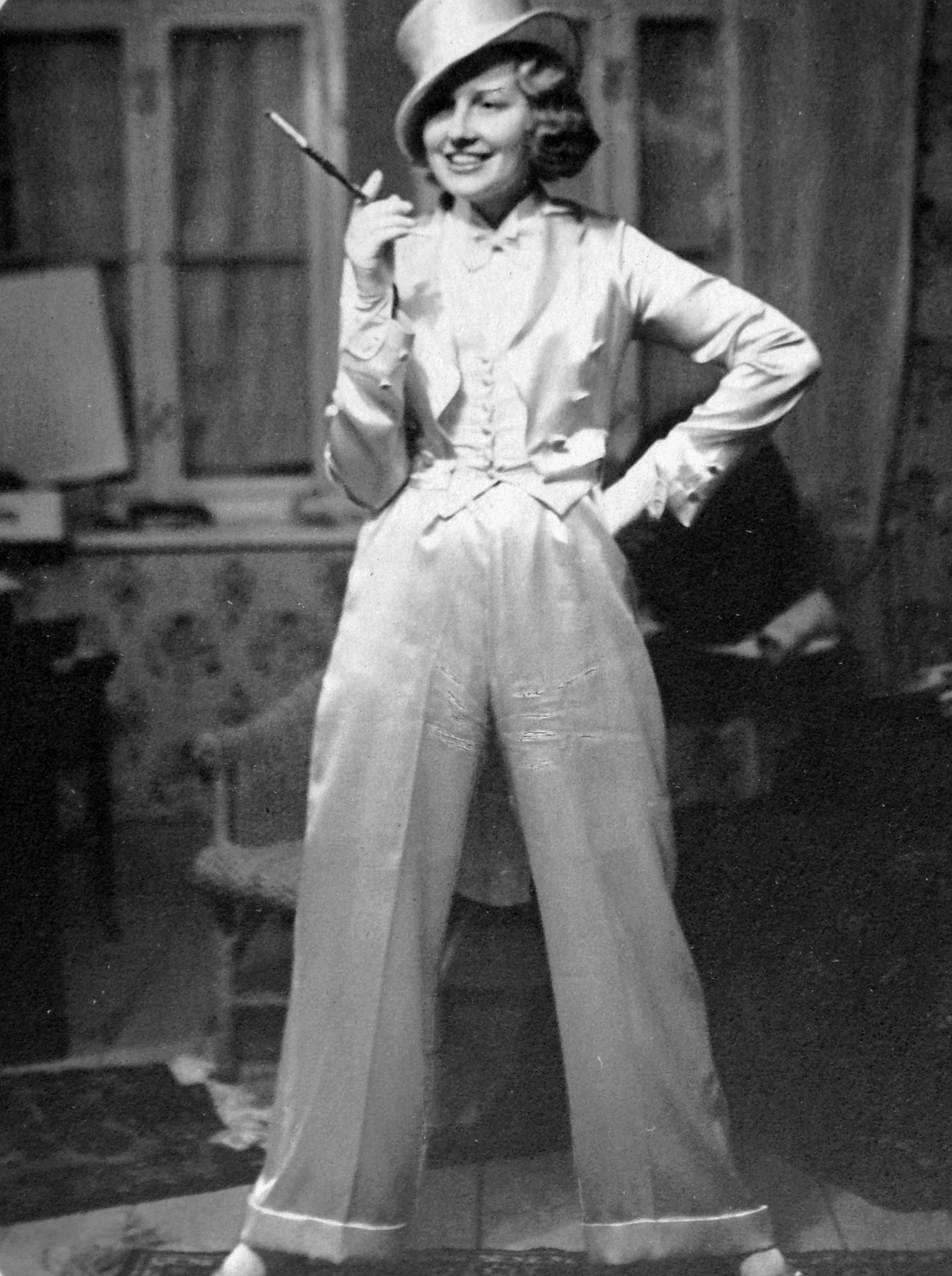
Actress with cigarette holder, 1936

Cigarette holders range from the simplest, single-material constructs to highly ornate objects with complex inlays of metal and gemstones. Rarer examples of these can be found in enamel, horn, tortoiseshell, or more precious materials such as amber and ivory.

A similar holder made of wood, meerschaum or bakelite and with an amber mouthpiece was used for cigars and was a popular accessory for men from the Edwardian period until the 1920s.

=== Size ===
As with evening gloves, ladies' cigarette holders are measured by four traditional formal standard lengths:

- opera length, usually 16 to 20 inches/40 to 50 cm
- theatre length, 10 to 14 inches/25 to 35 cm
- dinner length, 4 to 6 inches/10 to 15 cm
- cocktail length, which includes shorter holders

Traditionally, men's cigarette holders were no more than 4 inches long.

== Notable users ==
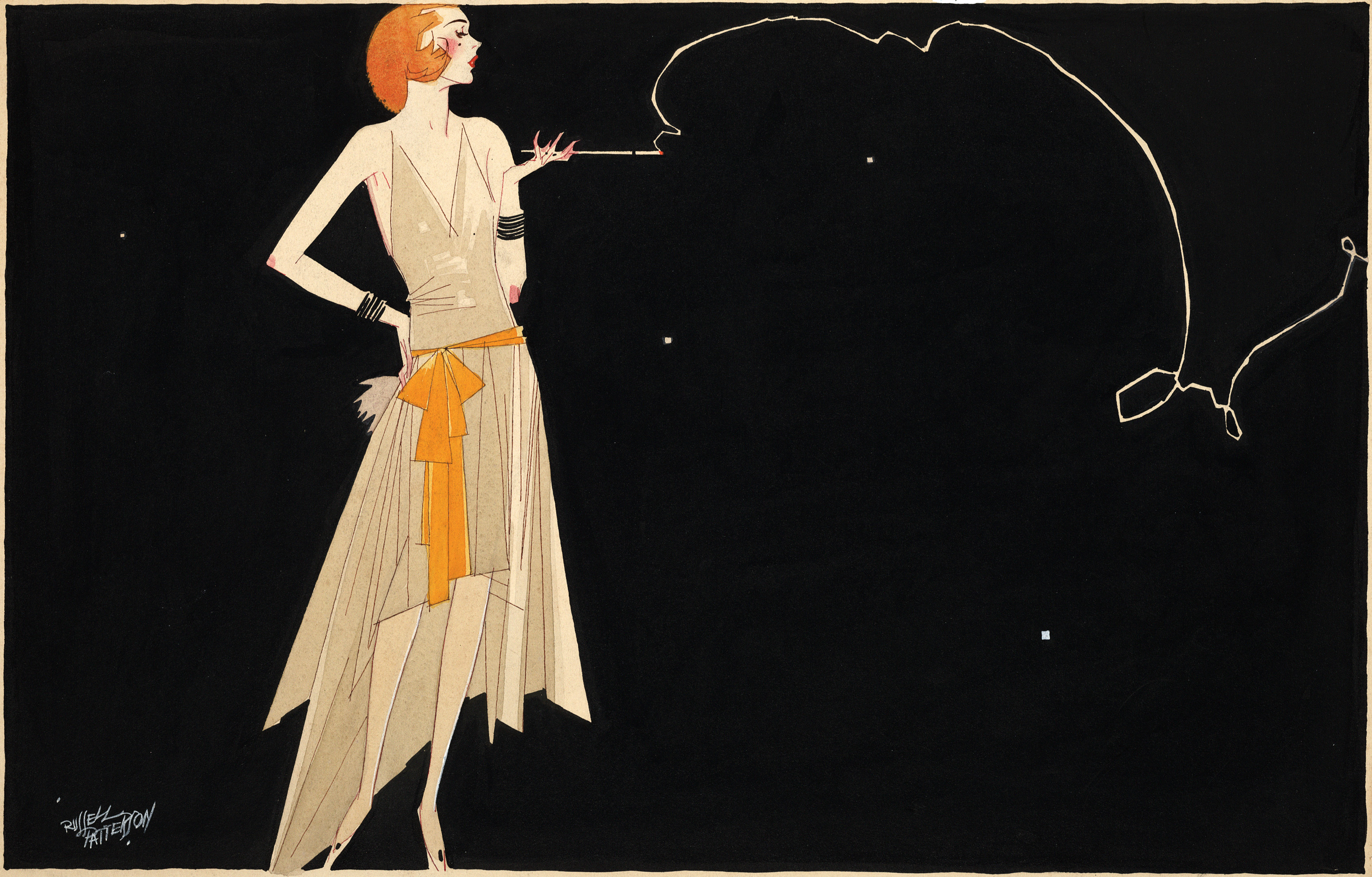
In Where There's Smoke There's Fire (1920s), Russell Patterson depicts a flapper whose cigarette holder is not only a fashion accessory, but an important element of the interplay of line in the drawing.

Well-known women who used cigarette holders include Audrey Hepburn, Lucille Ball, Jayne Mansfield, Jacqueline Kennedy, Rita Hayworth, Princess Margaret, Wendy Richard, Madalena Barbosa, Natalie Wood, Louise Brooks, and Ayn Rand. Scarlett Johansson is a contemporary example.

Among the best-known men who used cigarette holders were Franklin D. Roosevelt, Nat King Cole, Ivor Novello, Enrico Caruso, Vladimir Horowitz, Ian Fleming, Noël Coward, Hunter S. Thompson (though he regarded his as only a filter, using the TarGard filter), Tennessee Williams, Peter O’Toole, Fulgencio Batista, Sergei Rachmaninoff, Josip Broz Tito, and Hans von Bülow.

== Cultural references ==
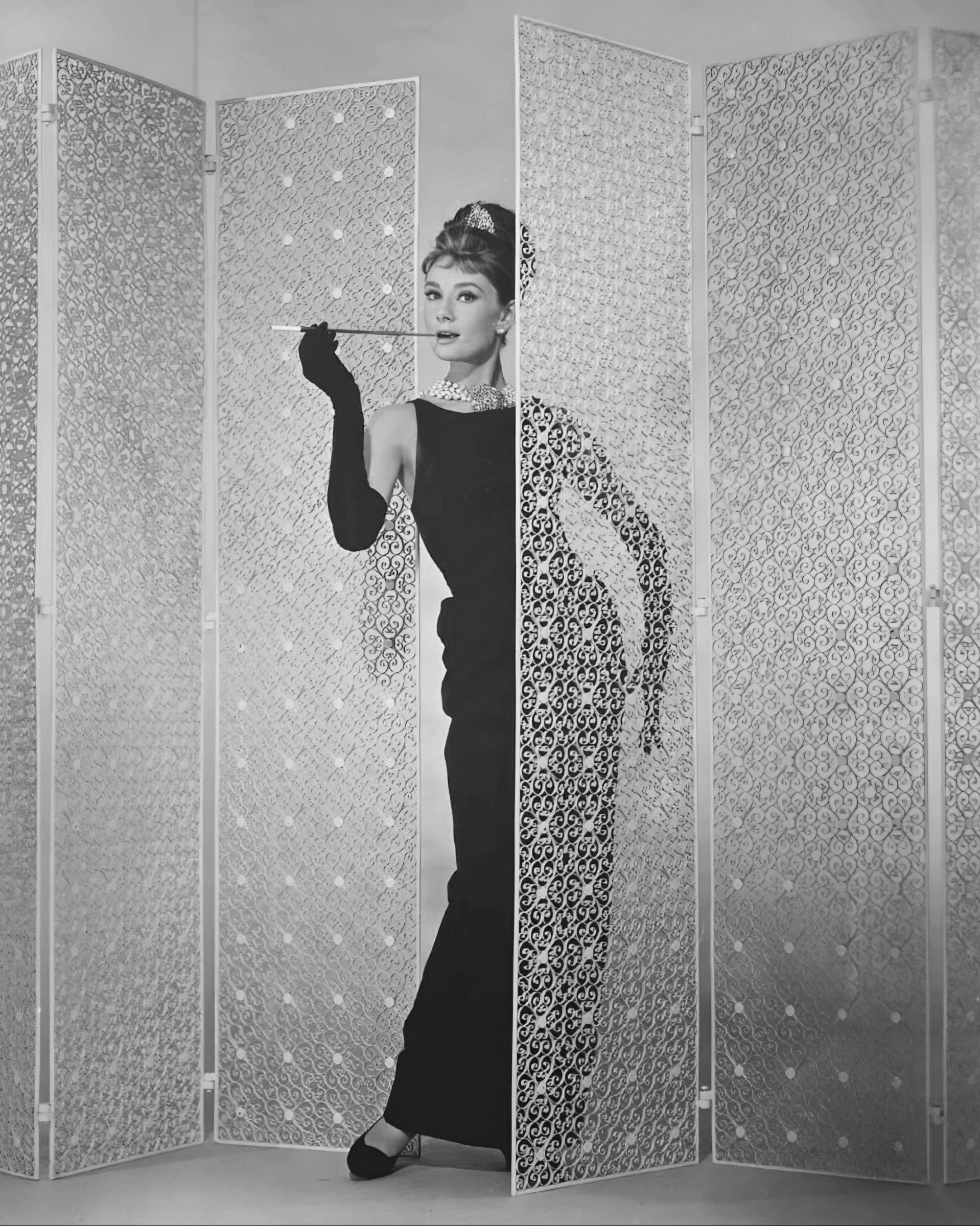
Audrey Hepburn holding an oversized cigarette holder in Breakfast at Tiffany's

Holders can be seen in period films like Titanic, and in films of the 1950s and 1960s. Holly Golightly, the naïve and eccentric café society girl portrayed by Audrey Hepburn in the 1961 classic Breakfast at Tiffany's, is famously seen carrying an oversized cigarette holder; the image of Hepburn wearing the famous Givenchy little black dress and with the foot-long cigarette holder in her hand, is considered one of the most iconic images of 20th-century American cinema. Lucille Ball can be seen using one in certain episodes of I Love Lucy. In Troop Beverly Hills, Shelly Long's character is seen throughout the movie using one. Cruella de Vil is seen using one repeatedly in the 1961 animated Disney film One Hundred and One Dalmatians and in the 1996 remake, in which she is portrayed by Glenn Close. Margo Lane (portrayed by Penelope Ann Miller) used one in The Shadow, as did Jade in Jonny Quest. Comedian Phyllis Diller had a stage persona which included holding a long cigarette holder from which she pretended to smoke (though she was a non-smoker in real life).

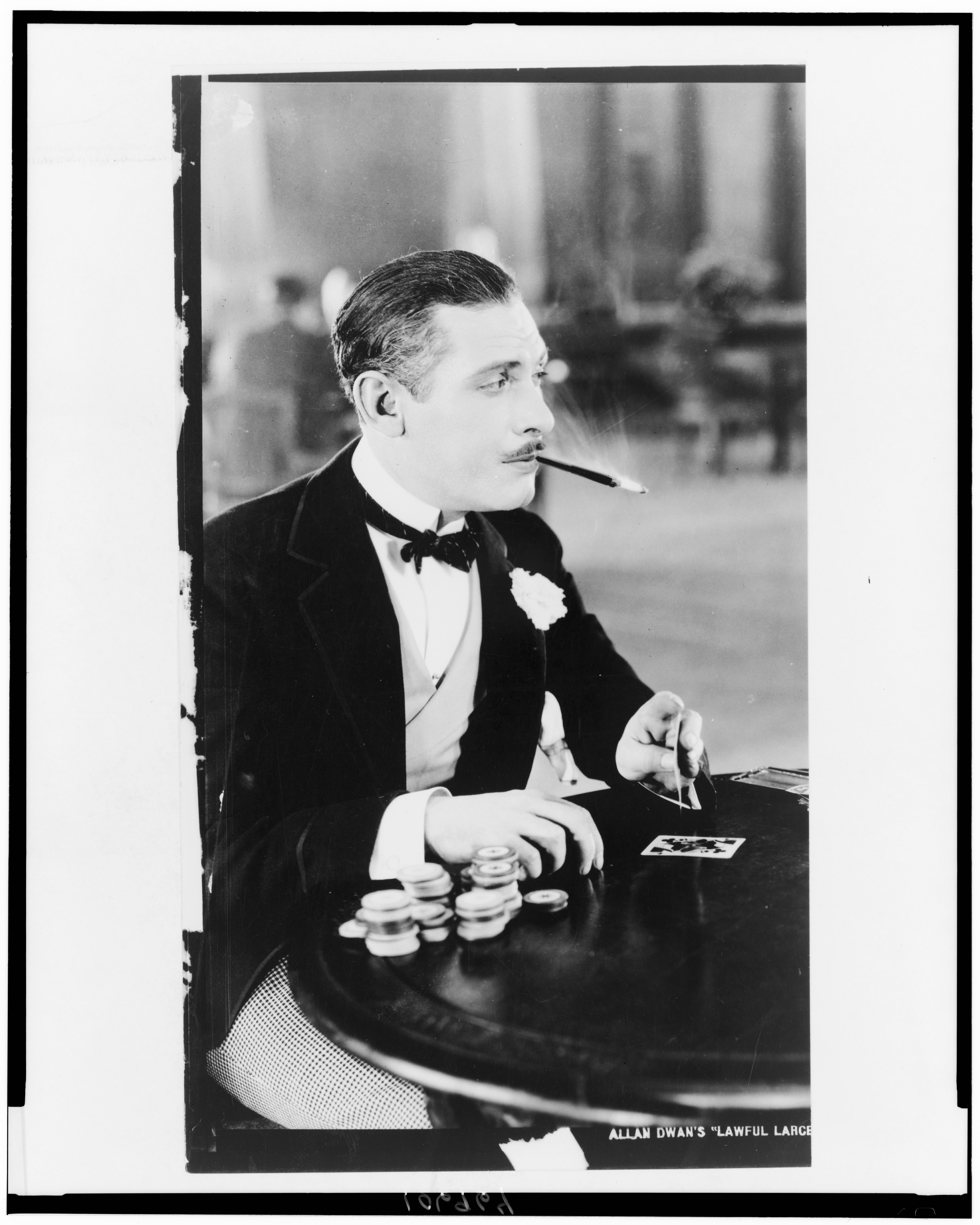
Man, with cigarette holder in mouth, playing cards, 1930

Fictional Peter Pan character Captain Hook possessed a unique double-holder, which allowed him to smoke two cigars (not cigarettes) at once.

Batman's nemesis The Penguin also commonly uses a cigarette holder in the comics, the Batman 1960s TV series, the live-action film Batman Returns, Batman: The Animated Series, and Harley Quinn.

In promotional material and multiple scenes of the James Bond film Diamonds are Forever 1971. The titular main villain Ernst Stavro Blofeld is seen holding a comically long cigarette holder. Interestingly enough, Blofeld's actor Charles Gray signature prop when playing villainous roles is a cigarette holder.

Dean Martin held a cigarette holder in his lips on the cover of his 1962 album French Style.

Edna Mode from the Incredibles franchise is often seen with an unlit cigarette in a cigarette holder.

Lady Penelope Creighton-Ward from the Thunderbirds franchise was regularly seen with a cigarette holder in the original 1965–1966 series.

Johnny Depp uses a cigarette holder in his role as Raoul Duke (alter ego of gonzo journalist Hunter S. Thompson) in the film Fear and Loathing in Las Vegas.

In cartoons, the Pink Panther, Colonel Sponsz from The Adventures of Tintin, and Jade from Jonny Quest used cigarette holders.

The lyrics to "Satin Doll", by Duke Ellington, and the cover art of the album Badfinger feature a cigarette holder. The video to "Into the Great Wide Open", by Tom Petty and the Heartbreakers, features Faye Dunaway using her cigarette holder as a magic wand.

Rachel Menken, a character on the AMC series Mad Men, smokes cigarettes with a short holder.

Bet Lynch, a character from Coronation Street, smoked her cigarettes with a cigarette holder during her times as the landlady of the Rovers Return Inn.

== See also ==
- Cigar holder
- Cigarette case
- Fashion brands (cigarettes)
