= Roger Scemama =

Roger Scemama (1898–1989) was a French jeweler. Born in Tunis to a wealthy Florentine family, Scemama moved to Paris in 1922 where he began parure-making. Scemama worked for the most famous French haute couture houses and resurrected the use of crystal in fashion in the 1950s. To complement the black Givenchy dress of Audrey Hepburn, Scemama was asked to design her necklace. Scemama designed jewelry for Jacques Fath, Balmain, Schiaparelli, Lanvin, Givenchy, Balenciaga, Dior and Yves Saint Laurent. Some of his jewelry creations for Yves Saint Laurent can be found in New York at the Metropolitan Museum of Art and others at the Palais Galliera, Musée de la Mode de la Ville de Paris.
