= Little black dress =

Black evening or cocktail dress

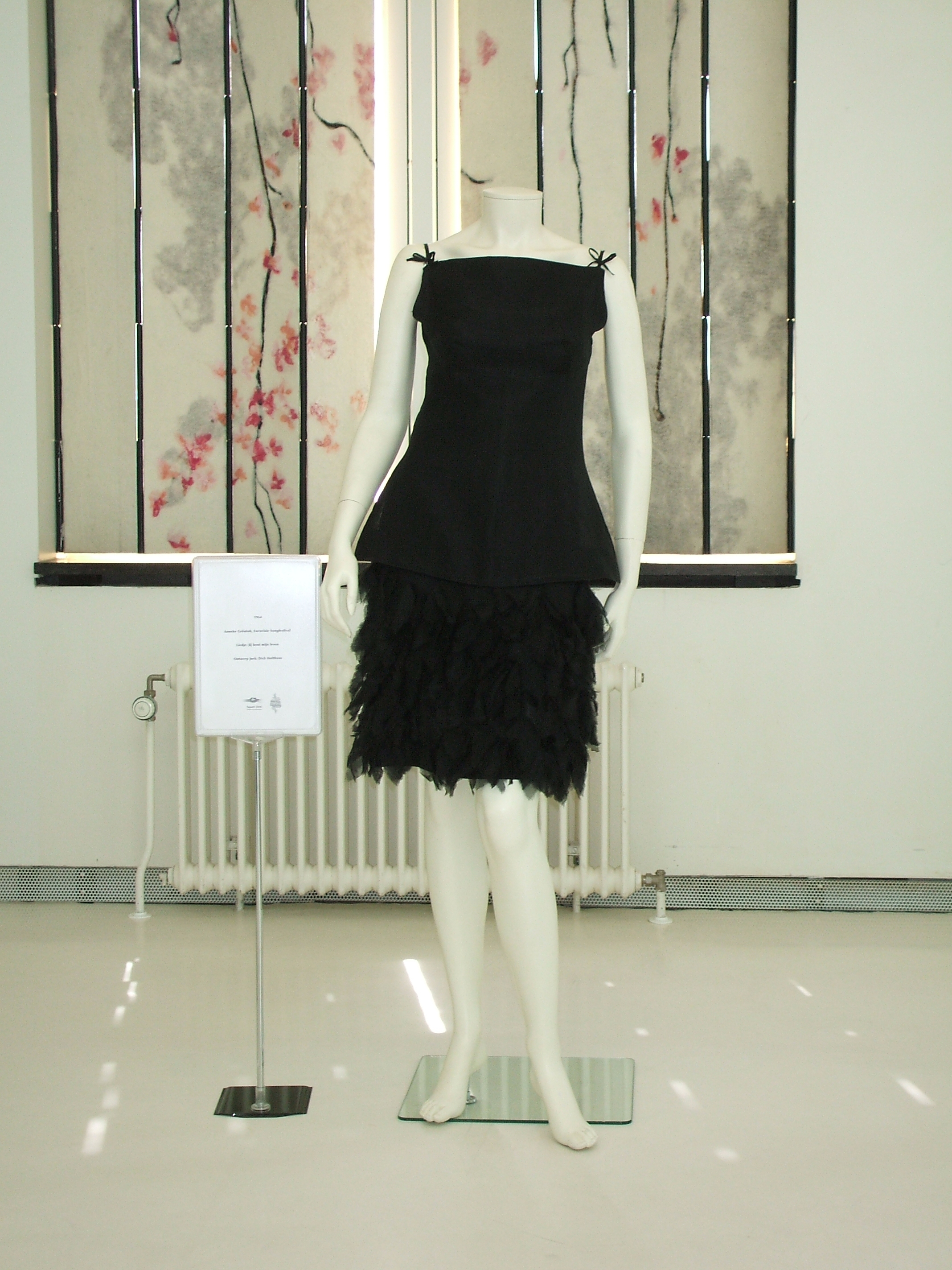
A little black dress from 1964 worn by Anneke Grönloh at Eurovision Song Contest 1964

The little black dress (LBD) is a black evening or cocktail dress, cut simply and often short. Fashion historians ascribe the origins of the little black dress to the 1920s designs of Coco Chanel. It is intended to be long-lasting, versatile, affordable, and widely accessible. Its ubiquity is such that it is often simply referred to as the "LBD".

The little black dress is considered essential to a complete wardrobe. Many fashion observers state that every woman should own a simple, elegant black dress that can be dressed up or down depending on the occasion. For example, the LBD can be worn with a jacket and pumps for daytime business wear. It can also be worn with ornate jewelry and accessories for evening wear or a formal event such as a wedding or ball.

== History ==
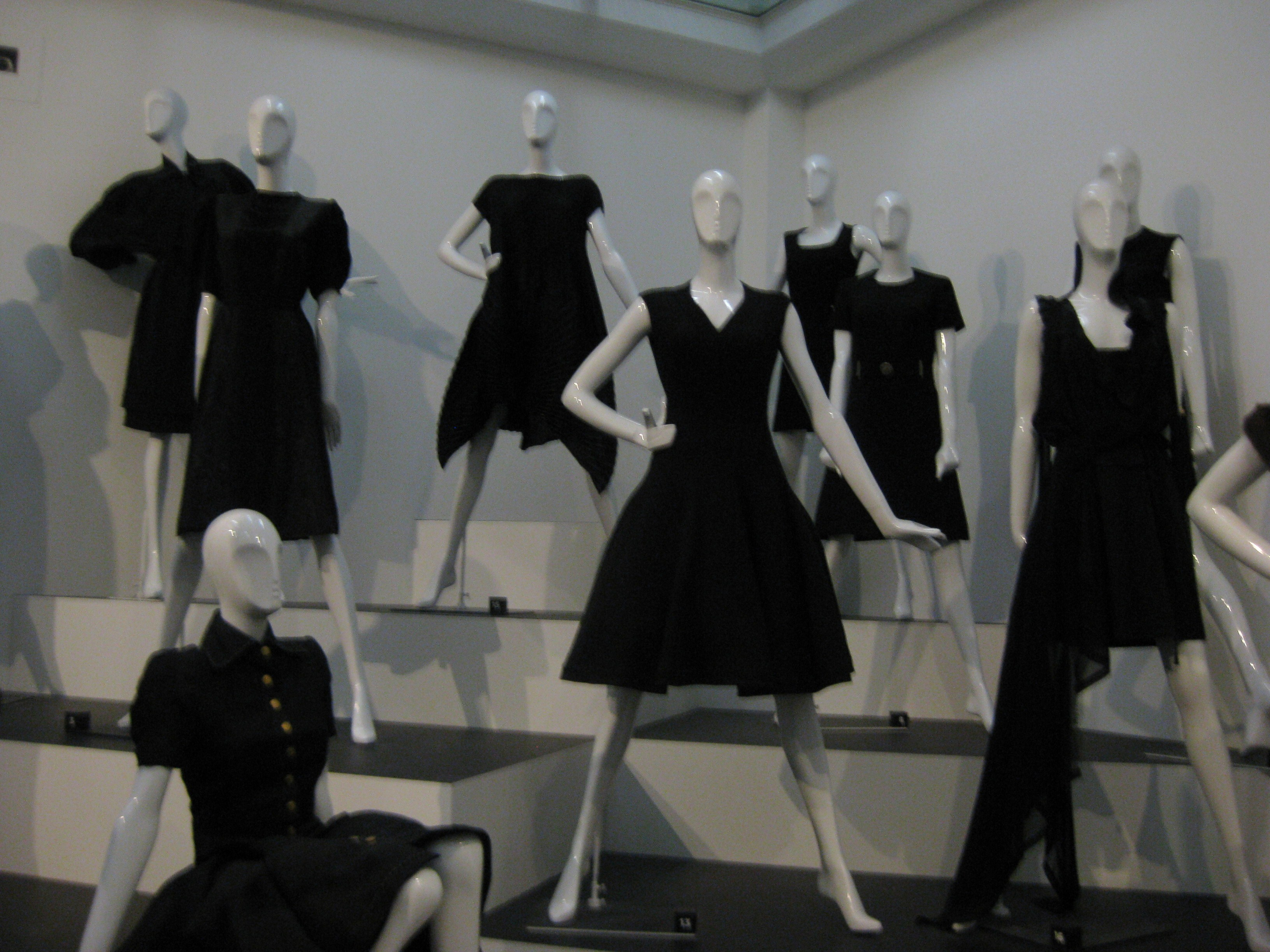
Variations on Chanel's little black dress during the Chanel: The Legend exhibition at the Kunstmuseum in The Hague in 2014

Black has always been a color rich in symbolism. In the early 16th century, black represented wealth among Spanish aristocrats and Dutch merchants as it was incredibly expensive to produce the black color from "imported oak apples." In the early 18th century, black represented romance and artistry. As Ann Demeulemeester said of it, "Black is poetic. How do you imagine a poet? In a bright yellow jacket? Probably not." In the early 19th century, black was adopted by the Romantics such as Byron, Shelley, and Keats, due to its melancholic aura. As the Victorian era began, black transitioned from a color of art to one of grief and mourning – widows were expected to wear black for at least a year – and also for service livery, as the uniform for maids.

In 1926 Coco Chanel published a picture of a short, simple black dress in American Vogue. It was calf-length, straight and decorated only by a few diagonal lines. Vogue called it "Chanel's Ford". Like the Model T, the little black dress was simple and accessible for women of all social classes. Vogue also said that the LBD would become "a sort of uniform for all women of taste". This, as well as other designs by the house of Chanel helped disassociate black from mourning, and reinvent it as the uniform of the high-class, wealthy, and chic. As Coco herself proclaimed, "I imposed black; it's still going strong today, for black wipes out everything else around."

The little black dress continued to be popular through the Great Depression, predominantly through its economy and elegance, albeit with the line lengthened somewhat. Hollywood's influence on fashion helped the little black dress's popularity, but for more practical reasons: as Technicolor films became more common, filmmakers relied on little black dresses because other colors looked distorted on screen and botched the coloring process. During World War II, the style continued in part due to widespread rationing of textiles, and in part as a common uniform (accessorized for businesswear) for civilian women entering the workforce.

The rise of Dior's "New Look" in the post-war era and the sexual conservatism of the 1950s returned the little black dress to its roots as a uniform and a symbol of the dangerous woman. Hollywood femmes fatales and fallen women characters were portrayed often in black halter-style dresses in contrast to the more conservative dresses of housewives or more wholesome Hollywood stars. Synthetic fibres made popular in the 1940s and 1950s broadened the availability and affordability of many designs.

The generation gap of the 1960s created a dichotomy in the design of the little black dress. The younger "mod" generation preferred, in general, a miniskirt on their versions of the dress and designers catering to the youth culture continued to push the envelope - shortening the skirt even more, creating cutouts or slits in the skirt or bodice of the dress, using sheer fabrics such as netting or tulle. Many women aspired to simple black sheath dresses similar to the black Givenchy dress worn by Audrey Hepburn in the acclaimed film Breakfast at Tiffany's.

The popularity of casual fabrics, especially knits, for dress and business wear during the 1980s brought the little black dress back into vogue. Coupled with the fitness craze, the new designs incorporated details already popular at the time such as broad shoulders or peplums: later in the decade and into the 1990s, simpler designs in a variety of lengths and fullness were popular. The grunge culture of the 1990s saw the combination of the little black dress with both sandals and combat boots, though the dress itself remained simple in cut and fabric.

The new glamour of the late 1990s led to new variations of the dress but, like the 1950s and the 1970s, colour re-emerged as a factor in fashion and formalwear and repeatedly shows an aversion to black. The resurgence of body conscious clothing, muted colour schemes, and the reemergence of predominant black, along with the retrospective trends of the 1980s in the late 2000s paved way to the return of interest to the dress. By 2014, a retrospective of Chanel's work at the Kunstmuseum in The Hague could say that the little black dress is "part of today’s universal fashion vocabulary."

== Gallery ==
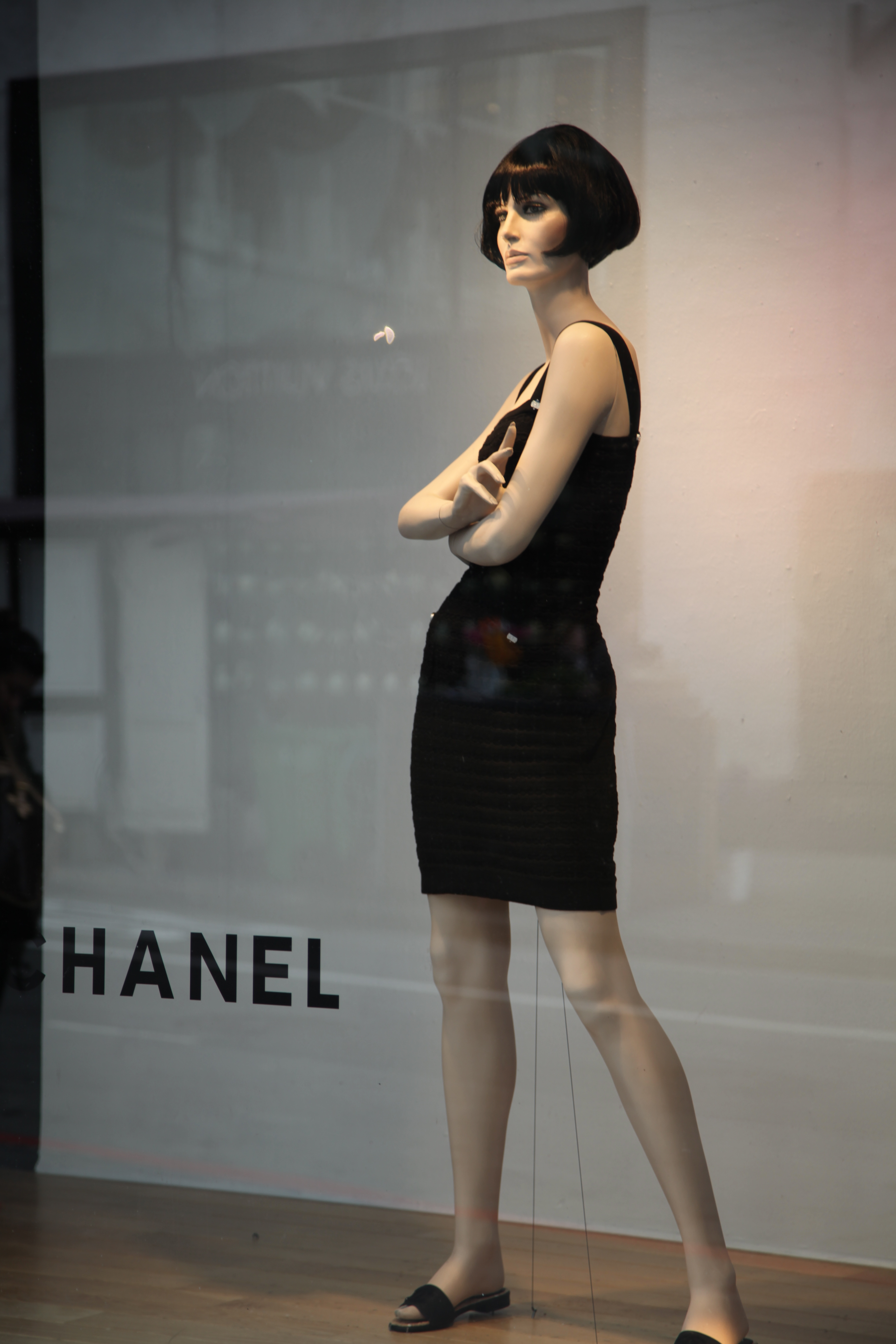
Chanel little black dress

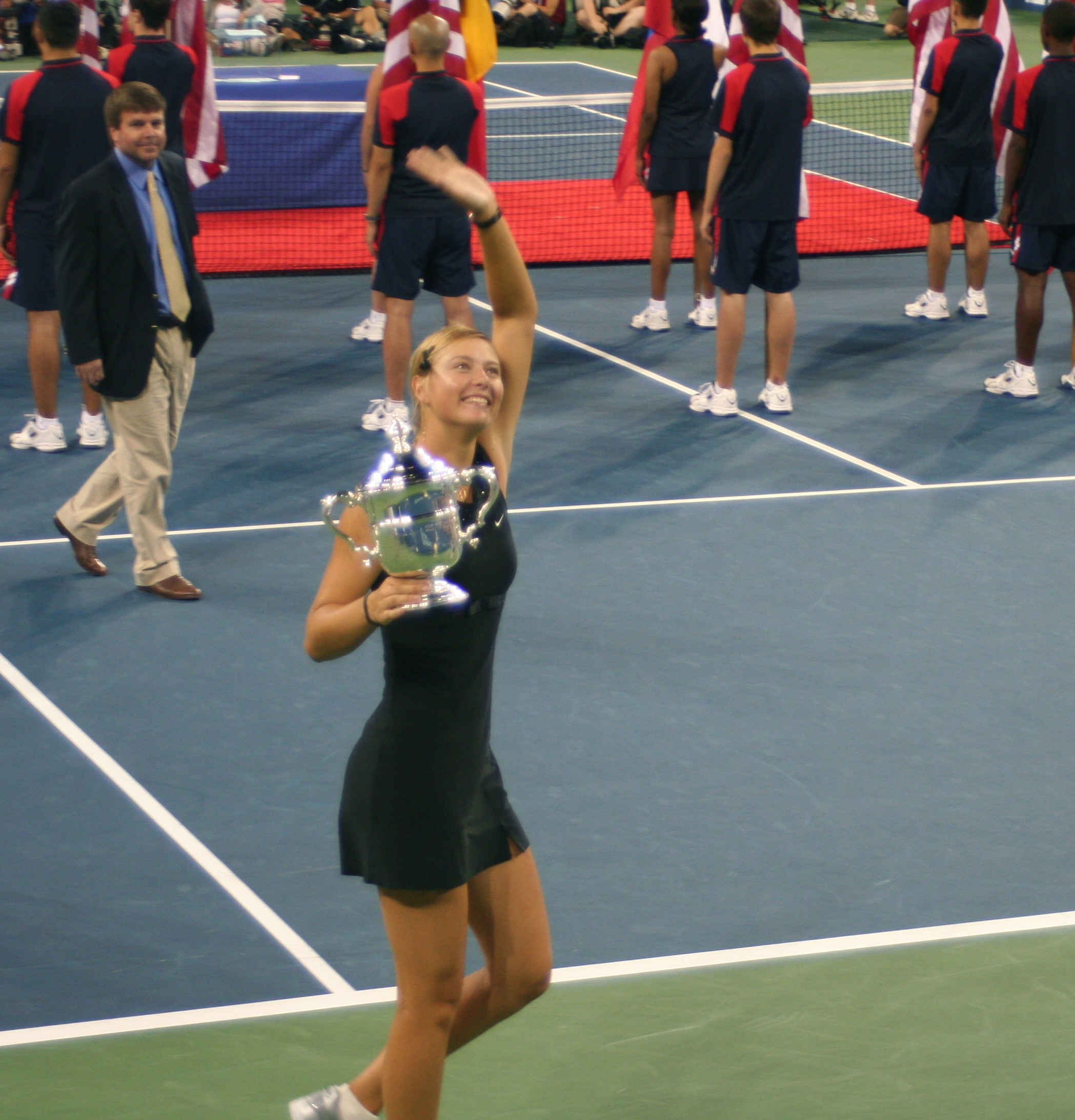
Maria Sharapova, 2006 US Open

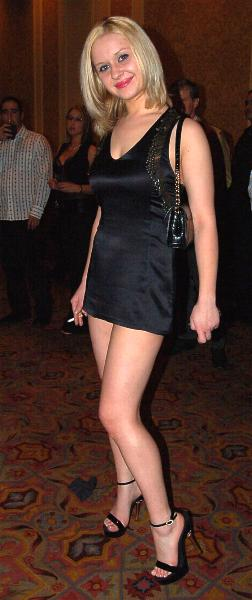
Aaralyn Barra, 2006 AVN Awards

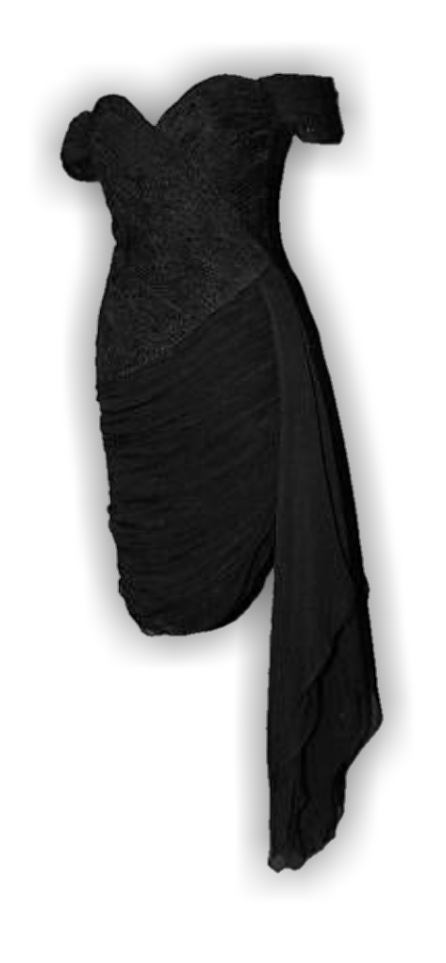
Lady Diana's famous revenge dress

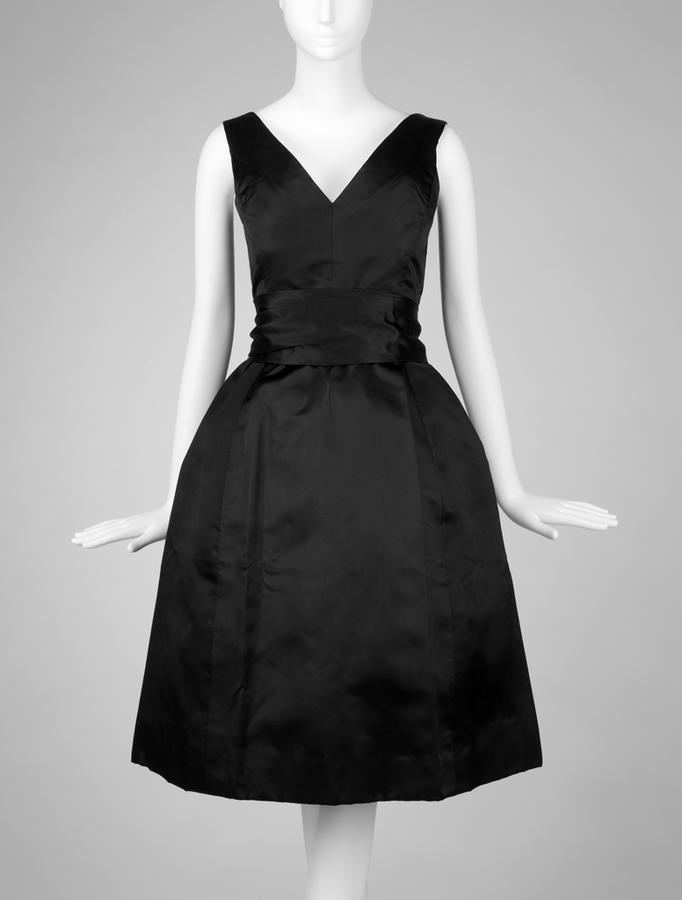
1954 Fall-Winter cocktail dress by Christian Dior

== Famous examples ==
The black dress worn by Audrey Hepburn as Holly Golightly in the film Breakfast at Tiffany's (1961), designed by Hubert de Givenchy, epitomized the standard for wearing little black dresses accessorized with pearls (together called "basic black"), as was frequently seen throughout the early 1960s. The dress set a record in 2006 when it was auctioned for £410,000, six times its original estimate.

Betty Boop, a cartoon character based in part on the 1920s "it girl" Helen Kane, was drawn wearing a little black dress in her early films, though with Technicolor later, Betty's dress became red.

Wallis Simpson, Duchess of Windsor, was known to own several little black dresses and said much in praise of the garments. One quote of the Duchess: "When a little black dress is right, there is nothing else to wear in its place."

Édith Piaf, the French folk icon, performed in a black sheath dress throughout her career: for this habit she was nicknamed "little black sparrow". It was thought that the dress helped audiences focus more on Piaf's singing and less on her appearance.

Diana, Princess of Wales wore a black Christina Stambolian dress to the Serpentine Gallery's summer party hosted by Vanity Fair in June 1994, the night her husband Charles, Prince of Wales admitted to having an adulterous affair with Camilla Parker Bowles. Diana's dress has been likened to a "little black dress".

Maria Sharapova wore a "little black dress" during her night matches at the 2006 US Open which she helped design with Nike and featured a round crystal-studded collar after being inspired by Hepburn, and went on to win the tournament. Upon her return to the sport in 2017, eleven years after winning the tournament, she again wore a "little black dress" collaborating with Nike and Swarovski for her night matches at the 2017 US Open to celebrate her return at the championships. The look was intended to be reminiscent of her 2006 dress.

In an incident at London's Covent Garden theatre in 2004, a director fired the then-obese soprano Deborah Voigt from an opera because she could not fit into a "little black cocktail dress", replacing her with the slimmer Anne Schwanewilms.
