= Black Givenchy dress of Audrey Hepburn =

Dress featured in the 1961 film Breakfast at Tiffany's

- Designer: Hubert de Givenchy
- Year: 1961
- Type: Sheath little black dress
- Material: Italian satin

Audrey Hepburn wore a "little black dress" in the 1961 romantic comedy film Breakfast at Tiffany's. The garment was originally designed by Hubert de Givenchy, with three existing copies preserved to date. A studio copy of this dress was worn during the opening scene of the film and another during a social party held at the apartment of the main protagonist.

The dress has been described as one of the most iconic clothing items of the twentieth century.

== History ==
Audrey Hepburn was a close friend of French designer Givenchy, referring to the designer as her "best friend" while he considered her his "sister".

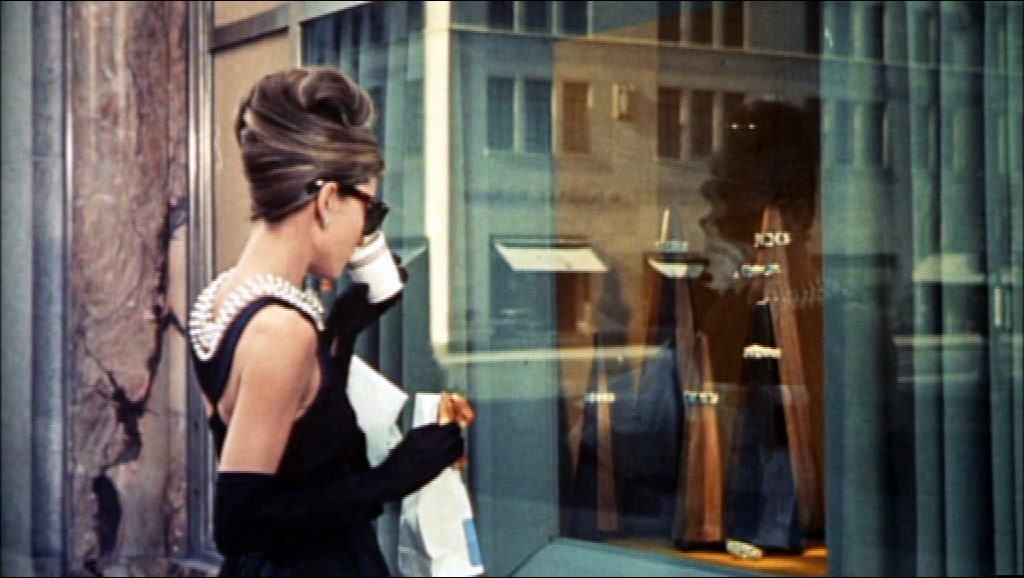
Still from the opening scene of Breakfast at Tiffany's (1961), Hepburn wears the dress complemented by a Roger Scemama necklace

In 1961, Givenchy designed a little black dress for the opening scene of Blake Edwards' romantic comedy, Breakfast at Tiffany's, in which Hepburn starred alongside actor George Peppard. Her necklace was made by Roger Scemama, a French jeweler and parure-maker who designed jewelry for Givenchy. Hepburn took two copies of the dress back to Paramount, but the dresses, which revealed a considerable amount of Hepburn's leg, were not suitable for the movie, and the lower half of the dress was redesigned by Edith Head.

- The original hand-stitched dress is currently stored within the House of Givenchy's private collectors archive.
- Another copy was returned to Paramount studios and was eventually placed on display at the Museo del Traje in Madrid, Spain.
- Another copy was auctioned at Christie's in December 2006, now owned by a private American collector.
- Another copy was given to a family friend in the Netherlands.

Accordingly, none of the actual dresses created by Givenchy were used in either the actual movie or the promotional press photography. The movie poster was designed by artist Robert McGinnis, and in Sam Wasson's book, Fifth Avenue, 5am, he explains that the photos on which he based the poster did not show any leg, and that he had added the leg to make the poster more appealing.

While the exact whereabouts of the dresses that were used in set remain unconfirmed, fashion experts point out that the film used copies have not shown up in any major collections since filming ended.

In November 2006, actress Natalie Portman appeared on the cover of Harper's Bazaar, wearing one of the original Givenchy dresses created for Breakfast at Tiffany's. On 5 December 2006, this dress was auctioned at Christie's in London and purchased by an anonymous buyer by telephone. The sale price was estimated by the auction house to have ended somewhere between £50,000 and £70,000, but the final price was £467,200 ($923,187). The proceeds of the sale went to the City of Joy Aid foundation to help build schools for poor children in Calcutta, now called Kolkata. Charity founder Dominique Lapierre noted on the ethical significance of the dresses sale, stating that it was a luxury item turned useful... essentially the dress was turned into “bricks and cement” to build schools for children in need.

When they witnessed such a frenzied auction, the amount that was raised so astonished Lapierre that he observed:

"I am absolutely dumbfounded to believe that a piece of cloth which belonged to such a magical actress will now enable me to buy bricks and cement to put the most destitute children in the world into schools."

Sarah Hodgson, a film specialist at Christie's said, "This is one of the most famous black dresses in the world—an iconic piece of cinematic history—and we are glad it fetched a historic price."

== Design ==
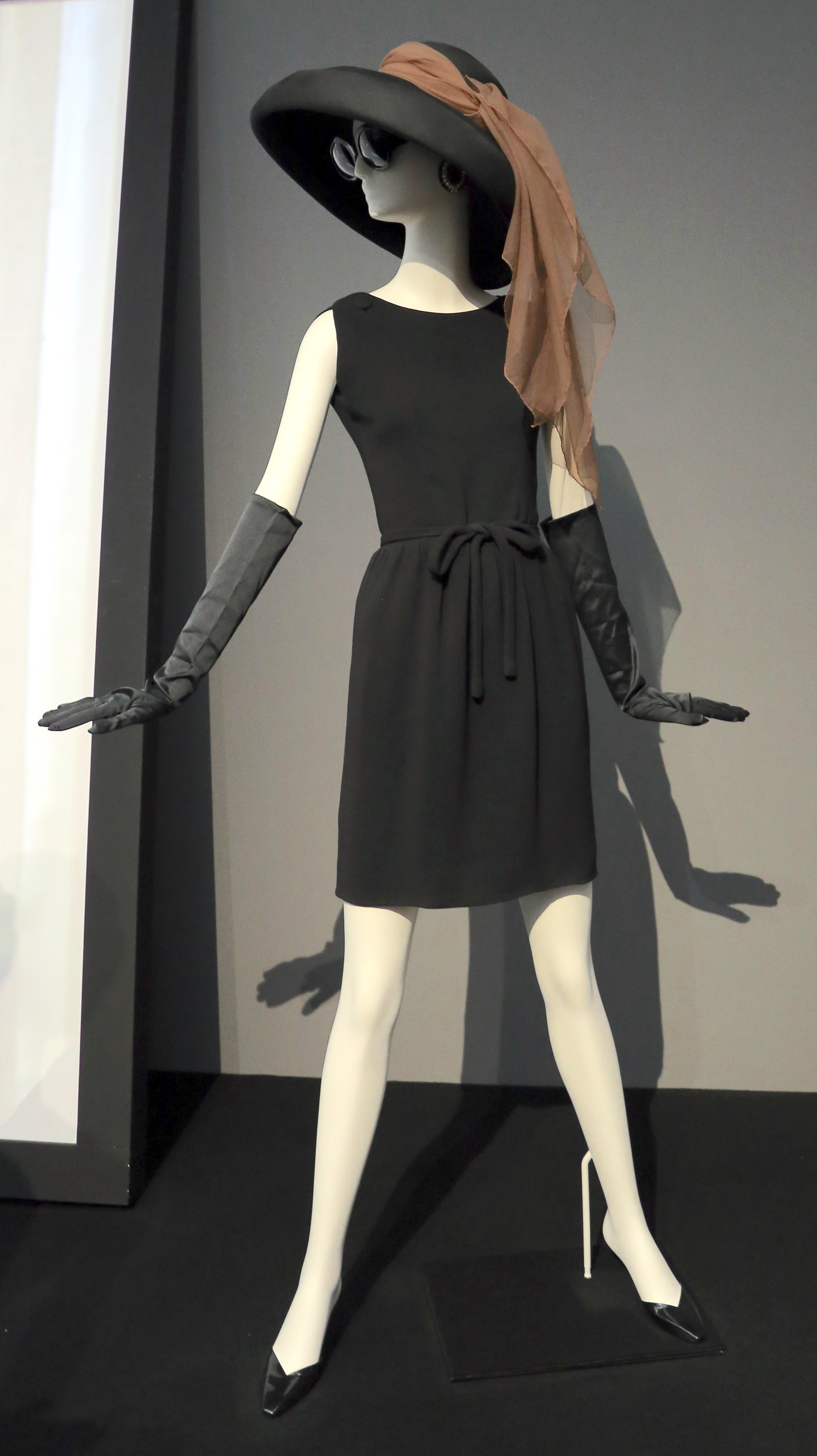
One dress in the Givenchy exhibition in the Gemeentemuseum Den Haag, 2017

The model is a Givenchy black Italian satin sheath evening gown. Christie's describes it as "a sleeveless, floor-length gown with fitted bodice embellished at the back with distinctive cut-out décolleté, the skirt slightly gathered at the waist and slit to the thigh on one side, labelled inside on the waistband Givenchy; accompanied by a pair of black elbow-length gloves". The bodice is slightly open at the back with a neckline that leaves uncovered shoulders. In the film, Audrey Hepburn wears a matching pair of elbow-length gloves the same colour and strings of pearls. The look has been described as "ultra-feminine" and "Parisian".

The little black dress attained such iconic fame and status that it became an integral part of a woman's wardrobe. Givenchy not only chose the dress for the character in the film, but also added matching accessories, including a many-stranded pearl choker, a foot-long cigarette holder, a large black hat and opera gloves. These details "visually defined the character" and "indelibly linked Audrey with her".

Hepburn, along with her designer friend Givenchy, created a dress to fit her physical features and her role in the film of a waif. The accessories alongside the black silk dress, which highlighted her lean shoulder blades, came to define Hepburn's style. The dark oversized sunglasses completed the ensemble of the little black dress (LBD), and the outfit was called "the definitive LBD".

== Reception ==
The dress is cited as one of the most iconic of the 20th century and film history. It has been described as "perhaps the most famous little black dress of all time" and exerted a major influence on fashion itself by quickly popularizing the little black dress.

In a survey conducted in 2010 by LOVEFiLM, Hepburn's little black dress was chosen as the best dress ever worn by a woman in a film. In this respect, Helen Cowley, publisher of LOVEFiLM, declared that "Audrey Hepburn has truly made that little black dress a fashion staple which has stood the test of time despite competition from some of the most stylish females around." Hepburn's white dress and hat worn in My Fair Lady was voted sixth.

Hepburn's little black dress (LBD) has been copied and parodied numerous times in other works worldwide, such as Natalie Portman in a 2006 Harper’s Bazaar cover shoot and Lee Ji-eun in Hotel del Luna.

=== Modern Ethical Impact ===
Although the original design Givenchy created remains an exclusive luxury item, its popularity helped make the “little black dress” or “LBD” something all people across the globe can wear and enjoy. This raises ethical questions about the gap between the realities of modern garment industry and the high value of designer fashion pieces.

In modern society, the “Givenchy look” continues to influence how many brands market the fashion to consumers, emphasizing the contrast between high end couture and mass market consumerism.

The dress remains a benchmark for fashion ethics and value, often used to show Givenchy’s lasting influence.

== See also ==
- White floral Givenchy dress of Audrey Hepburn
- Black dress of Rita Hayworth
- Pink dress of Marilyn Monroe
- White dress of Marilyn Monroe
- List of film memorabilia
- List of individual dresses
