= Cocktail dress =

Semi-formal dress

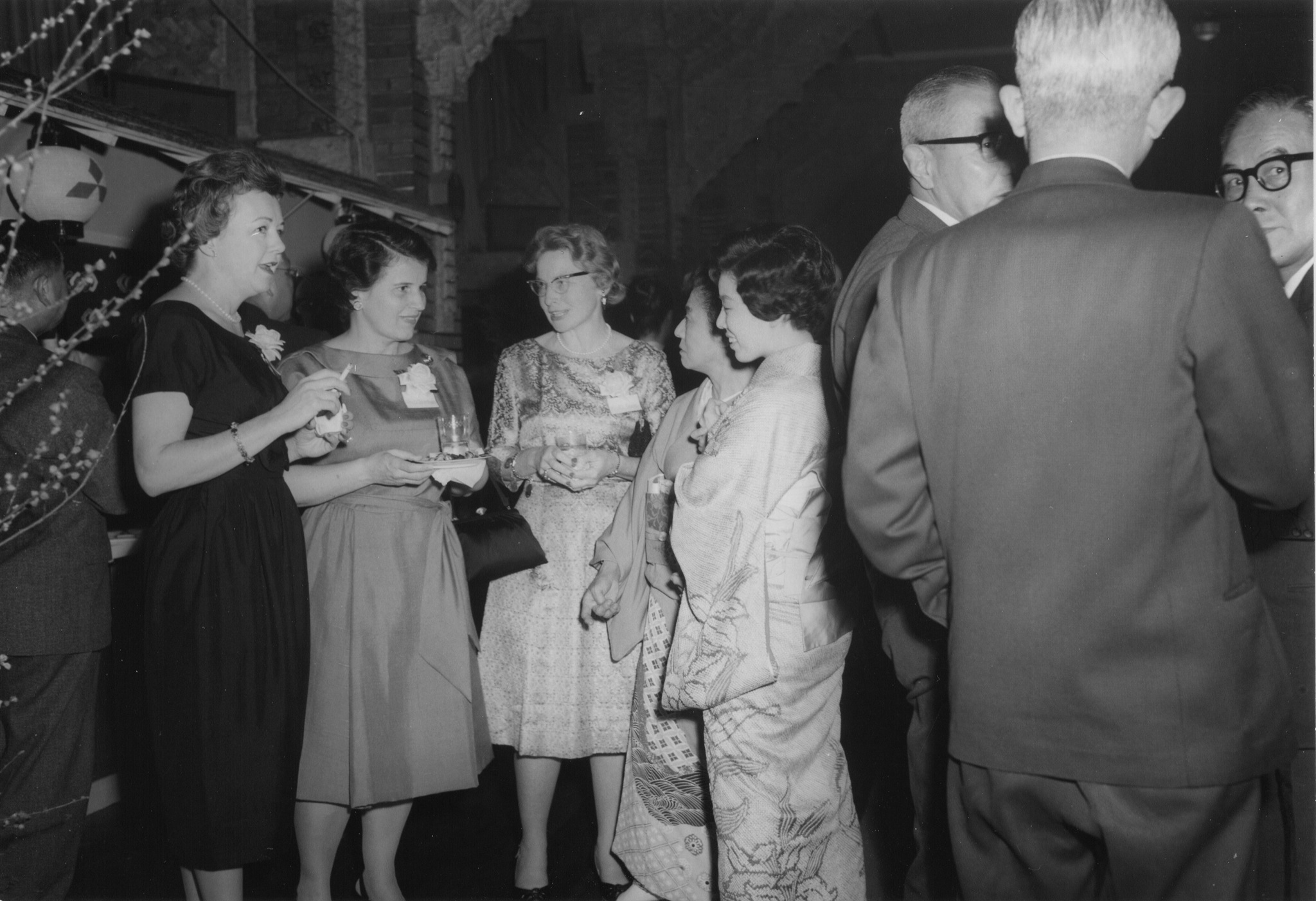
Cocktail Party at the Imperial Hotel, March 1961

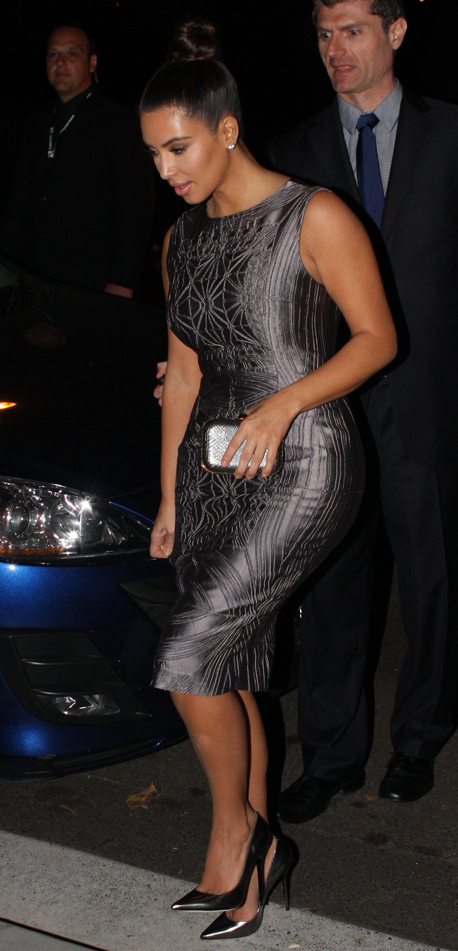
Kim Kardashian wearing a cocktail dress, 2012

A cocktail dress is a dress suitable at semi-formal occasions, sometimes called cocktail parties, usually in the late afternoon, and usually with accessories.

After World War I, the idea of the "working woman" became popular. After 1929, it was more common to see women in a social context. With the help of liberation organizations, the idea of a "modern woman" began to emerge, and soon the "drinking woman" could be seen in business settings. Companies increasingly hosted cocktail parties to have an entertaining environment for employees and customers to mingle. These parties usually began after 5:00 p.m. Since guests are expected to walk around and meet people, clothes made for these occasions are often functional and comfortable. This practical and fashionable garment became a popular uniform for progressive elite women in the 1920s.

== History ==
=== 19th century ===
A dinner dress was a gown that was worn by ladies in the Victorian era for dinners and parties at homes. It could be very elaborate, but often had long sleeves, a high neck, or a narrow skirt to set them apart from evening gowns. In the 20th century however, dinner dresses went out of fashion and were replaced by evening gowns for formal dinners.

=== 20th century ===
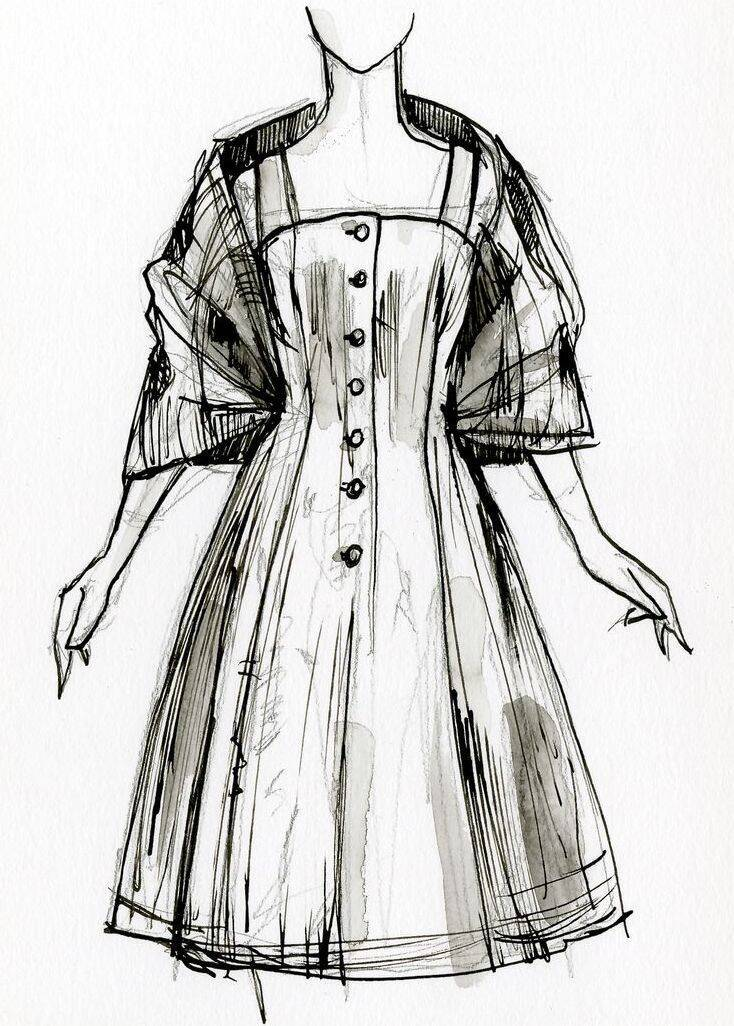
Sketch of French cocktail dress

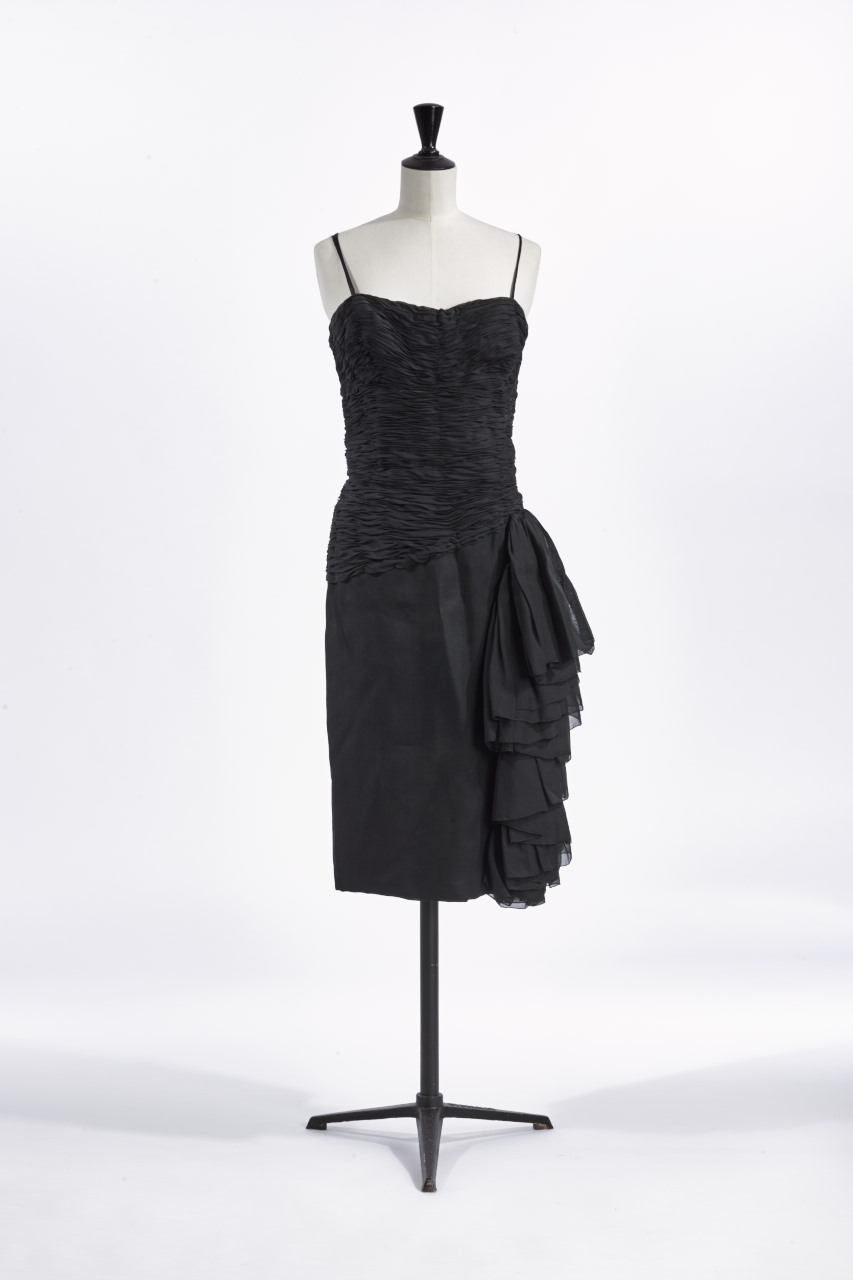
Italian Cocktail dress, 1960

During the 1920s, French couture's clientele consisted mainly of American department stores that reproduced French designs and promoted French designers. This led French designers to create dresses to appeal to American buyers. Since cocktail parties originated in the United States, French designers created their own version of a cocktail dress. However, unlike the strict, professional cuts of American-styled dresses, the French designed much looser and free flowing beach pajamas, consisting of a silk top and palazzo pants, usually paired with a mid-calf-length wrap jacket or sheath. These clothes were usually worn for more exclusive and intimate gatherings. The French style valued simplicity and elegance in their designs, while American-styles valued functionality and efficiency. American clients wanted a single dress that could be modified to fit several times of the day with the use of accessories. The fabric of the dress and whether it was worn with a cocktail hat differentiated a day dress from a cocktail dress. By the mid-1920s, hemlines of dresses were just below the knee rather than ankle-length, which was more common for evening gowns.

==== The Great Depression ====
To take account of the economic crisis, designers such as Muriel King emphasized the importance of accessories by designing simple dresses, which also helped the market for jewelry, hats, gloves, and sheaths. After the Wall Street crash of 1929, private cocktail parties became more popular than corporate gatherings, as luxurious lifestyles were no longer seen as fashionable. These elite gatherings helped the rise of day-to-evening fashion.

==== Post–World War II ====
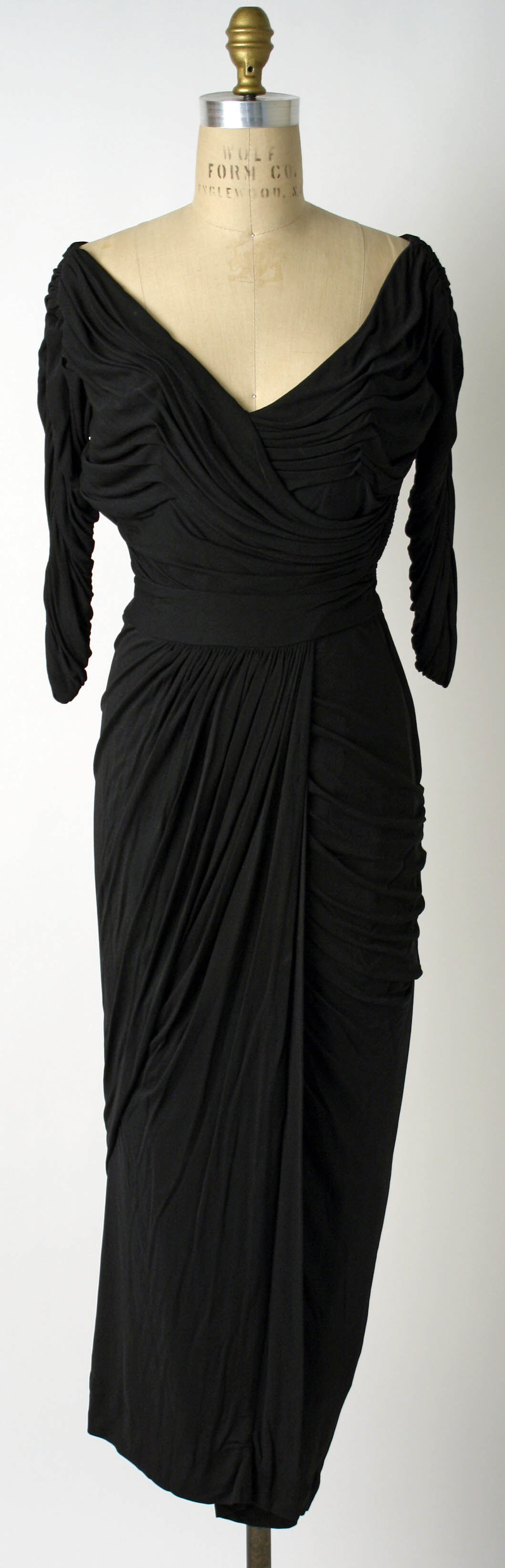
American cocktail dress, 1950s

After World War II, Dior came out with the "New Look", which consisted of a tight waistline, long hemlines, and fuller skirts. This style flattered the female silhouette and created a romantic aura around the aesthetic. Since cocktail parties were so popular, American designers such as Anne Fogarty began to create cocktail dresses that revolved around the "New Look" using less expensive fabrics. French designers, such as Dior and Jacques Fath, saw the high market for cocktail dresses and began to design dresses for American department stores.

With the increasing feasibility and popularity of air travel, French cocktail dresses became popular globally. As French women traveled to wealthy resort cities, the designs of their cocktail dresses spread among the American elite. While French couture relied on travel and American department stores, American designers relied on fashion magazines, such as Vogue and Vanity Fair, and the need to dress semi-formally for cocktail hour.

In 1948, Christian Dior labeled this business-casual dress "cocktail dress", which allowed department stores to advertise specifically "cocktail" garments and accessories, increasing the growth of fashion stores. The craze for cocktail culture drove sales in cocktail merchandise as well, such as cocktail and martini-printed fabrics.

== Composition ==
The American cocktail dress could be anything from a "little black dress" to a floral-printed dress or a plain, short evening gown, as long as it was worn with accessories. These might be earrings, pearl necklaces, bracelets, or brooches (stylish in the 1950s). However, it was most common to wear costume jewelry. Although they were inexpensive, wearing large amounts was seen as daring and luxurious, especially when wearing a modest dress. In addition, the jewelry would be worn along with hats: velvet, lace, or horsehair; little turbans or close-fitting caps of brocade, taffeta, or satin. Gloves were mandatory, needed to be fashionably up-to-date, and could be any length, material, or color. Shoes were usually high heels, but evening satin sandals were also common and could be dyed to match the color of the dress.

== Etiquette ==
As cocktail parties became more high-end, the attire became subject to stricter guidelines, which allowed people to easily differentiate between the different identities at the party: the organizer, hostess, and wife. There were strict rules of etiquette as women needed to wear gloves, hostesses were not allowed to wear accessories, and guests were required to wear cocktail hats, but never indoors.

== See also ==
- Party dress
