= Breakfast at Tiffany's (film) =

1961 film by Blake Edwards

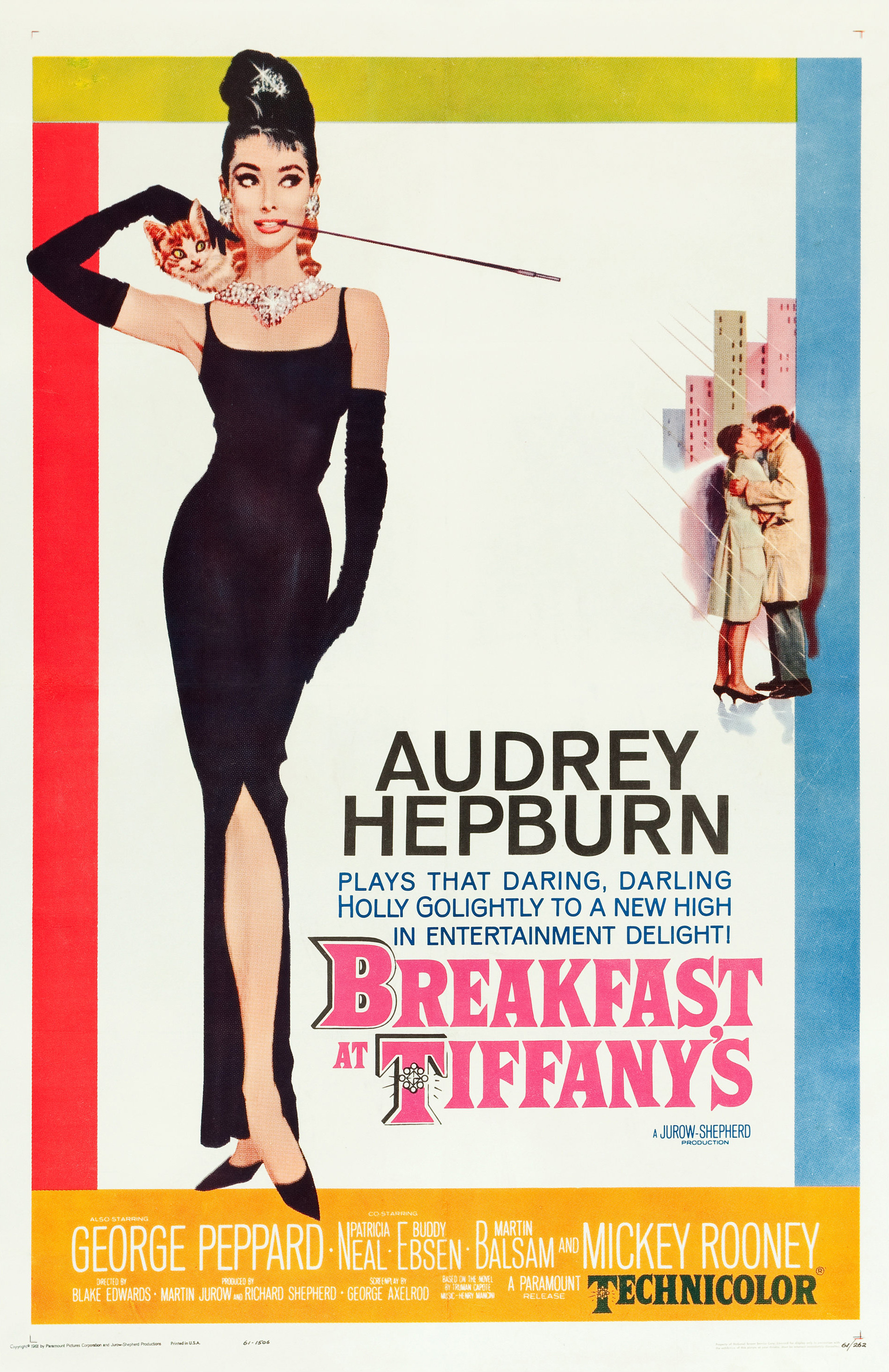
- Theatrical release poster
- Directed by: Blake Edwards
- Screenplay by: George Axelrod
- Based on: Breakfast at Tiffany's by Truman Capote
- Produced by: Martin Jurow; Richard Shepherd
- Starring: Audrey Hepburn; George Peppard; Patricia Neal; Buddy Ebsen; Martin Balsam; Mickey Rooney
- Cinematography: Franz F. Planer
- Edited by: Howard Smith
- Music by: Henry Mancini
- Production companies: Jurow-Shepherd; Spinel Entertainment
- Distributed by: Paramount Pictures
- Release date: October 5, 1961
- Running time: 114 minutes
- Country: United States
- Language: English
- Budget: $2.5 million
- Box office: $14 million

Breakfast at Tiffany's is a 1961 American romantic comedy film directed by Blake Edwards from a screenplay by George Axelrod and based on the 1958 novella by Truman Capote. It stars Audrey Hepburn, George Peppard, Patricia Neal, Buddy Ebsen, Martin Balsam, and Mickey Rooney. In the film, Holly Golightly, a naïve, eccentric socialite, meets a struggling writer who moves into her apartment building.

Development for the film began soon after the publication of Capote's novel, with several actors, including Marilyn Monroe, Shirley MacLaine, Kim Novak, Steve McQueen, Jack Lemmon, and Robert Wagner, considered for the lead roles prior to Hepburn and Peppard being cast. The screenplay, which deviates from Capote's novella, was originally completed by Axelrod and director John Frankenheimer, who was replaced by Edwards well into pre-production. Principal photography began on October 2, 1960, with filming taking place in New York City and at the Studios at Paramount in Hollywood, California. The film's music was composed by Henry Mancini and the lyrics for the theme song, "Moon River" were written by Johnny Mercer.

Breakfast at Tiffany's was released in the United States on October 5, 1961, by Paramount Pictures. It grossed $14 million worldwide and received critical acclaim for its music and Hepburn's style and performance, being nominated for five Academy Awards, including Best Actress for Hepburn, and winning two (Music Score of a Dramatic or Comedy Picture for Mancini and Best Song for Mancini and Mercer). The film also received numerous other accolades, although Rooney's portrayal of the character I. Y. Yunioshi garnered significant subsequent controversy for being perceived as racist. In 2012, the film was selected for preservation in the U.S. National Film Registry by the Library of Congress for being "culturally, historically, or aesthetically significant".

== Plot ==
Fending off a date from the night before, Holly Golightly pauses at the window of the Tiffany & Co. flagship store on her way home; her date finds her at her apartment building. He demands that the $50 he gave her "for the powder room" entitles him to her favors. When her neighbor, Mr. Yunioshi, appears to complain that she abuses buzzing his doorbell to be let in, Holly escapes her unwanted escort. Later, new neighbor Paul Varjak buzzes Holly to gain entrance to the building and asks to use her telephone. After using her phone, Paul takes in Holly's unconventional décor (her sofa is half a claw-foot bathtub) and lifestyle. Holly suddenly remembers it's Thursday and she must leave for her weekly visit to incarcerated mobster Sally Tomato. Tomato's lawyer pays her $100 (Note: $1000 in 2023) a week to deliver "the weather report". A taxi arrives with Paul's "decorator" Emily Eustace Failenson, a wealthy older woman, whom Paul nicknames "2E"; Paul introduces them as Holly departs in the taxi. That night, when Holly crawls out onto the fire escape to elude another overeager date, she peers through the window and sees Paul in bed and 2E leaving him money and kissing him goodbye.

Climbing in the window, Holly chats with Paul and learns he is a writer who has not had anything published in five years. Holly explains she is saving money to support her brother, Fred, after he completes his Army service. Tired, Holly climbs into bed with Paul, asserting that they are just friends. They fall asleep but are awakened when Holly has a nightmare about Fred. When Paul questions her, Holly chides him for prying and leaves. To apologize later, Holly buys Paul a typewriter ribbon and invites him to a party at her apartment. There, he meets her Hollywood agent, Berman, who describes Holly's transformation from a country girl into a Manhattan "socialite". Mag Wildwood, Holly’s rival, brings wealthy Brazilian politician José da Silva Pereira and wealthier American Rusty Trawler.

Some time later, 2E enters Paul's apartment, worried about someone loitering outside the building. Paul confronts the elderly man, who explains he is Holly's husband, Doc Golightly, who married Holly when she was 14 years old, also taking in her younger brother. Holly ran away, and he has come to take her back to rural Texas. After Paul reunites them, Holly informs Paul the marriage was annulled and declines to return with Doc, who says he will not support Fred when he is discharged. Determined to support Fred, Holly dates Trawler, whom she intends to marry for his money. A few days later, Paul learns his short story, inspired by Holly, will be published. On the way to tell Holly, he sees a newspaper headline announcing Trawler's marriage to someone else.

Holly and Paul agree to spend the day together, taking turns doing things each has never done before. At Tiffany's, unable to afford a pricey present, he has the ring from a box of Cracker Jack engraved as a present for her. After spending the night together, Paul awakens to find Holly gone. 2E arrives and calmly accepts when he ends their affair. Still determined to marry rich, Holly dates José, who is alarmed when, learning Fred has been killed in a jeep accident at Fort Riley, Holly trashes her apartment in a tantrum.

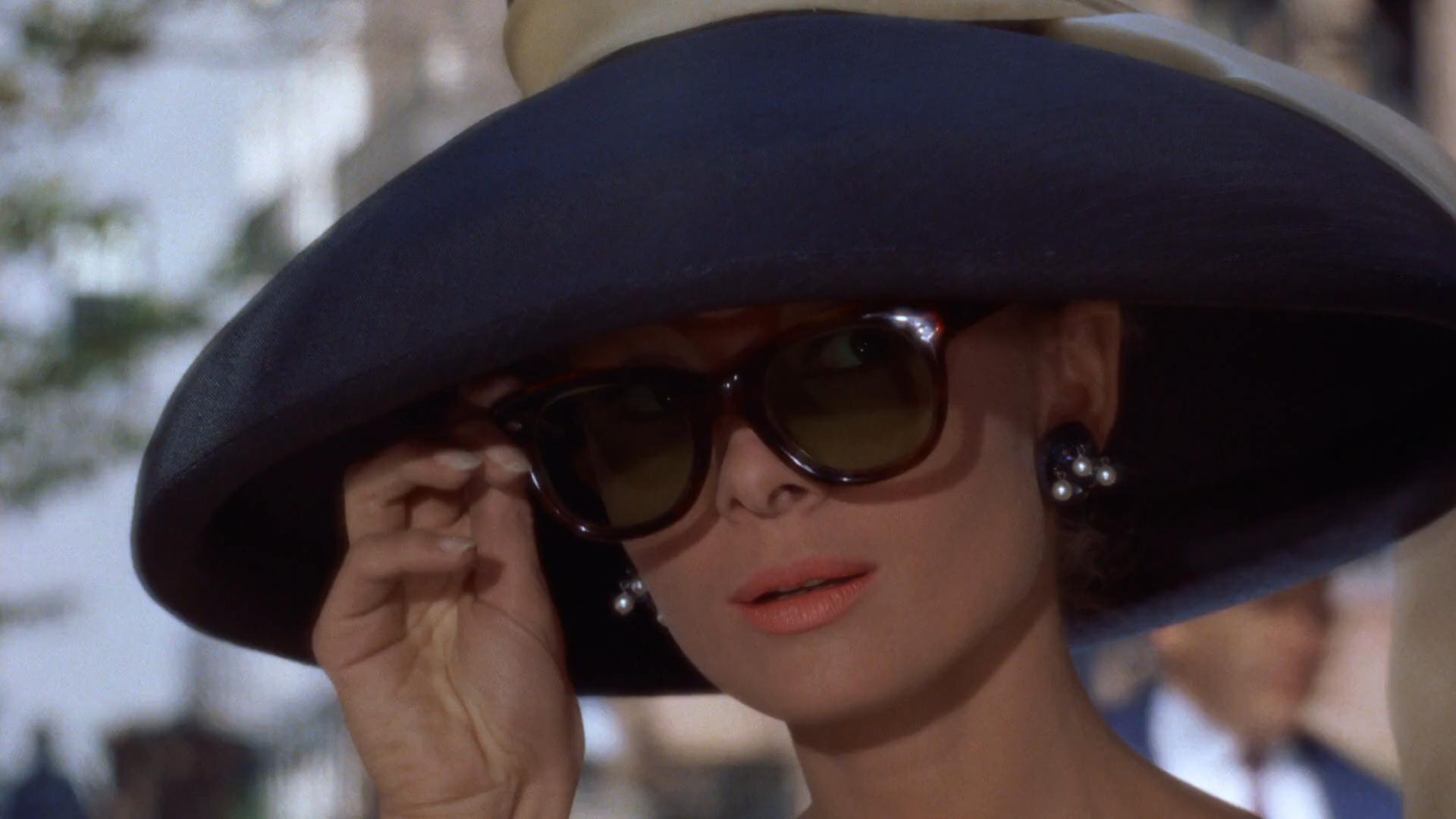
Audrey Hepburn as Holly Golightly

Months later, Holly prepares to move to Brazil and marry José but is arrested in connection with a drug ring run by Sally Tomato. Berman pays her bail, and Paul picks her up in a cab with all her things, including her nameless pet, Cat, and a breakup letter from José. Holly decides to go to Brazil anyway, breaking bail, as Paul declares that he loves her. Holly declares she doesn't belong to anybody—just as her nameless cat doesn't belong to anyone—shoving Cat out into an alley. Paul storms out of the cab, leaving the engraved ring with Holly. After she puts it on, Holly runs back to the alley, where Paul is looking for Cat. Finding Cat, Holly cradles him in her coat and, smiling, walks into Paul's embrace as they kiss.

== Cast ==
- Audrey Hepburn as Holly Golightly
- George Peppard as Paul Varjak
- Patricia Neal as Mrs. Emily Eustace "2E" Failenson
- Buddy Ebsen as Doc Golightly
- Martin Balsam as O.J. Berman
- Mickey Rooney as Mr. Yunioshi
- José Luis de Vilallonga as José da Silva Pereira
- John McGiver as Tiffany's salesman
- Dorothy Whitney as Mag Wildwood
- Stanley Adams as Rutherford "Rusty" Trawler
- Elvia Allman as the librarian
- Alan Reed as Sally Tomato
- Miss Beverly Hills as the stripper
- Claude Stroud as Sid Arbuck
- Orangey as Cat (Frank Inn, trainer)

== Production ==
=== Development ===
After Paramount producers Martin Jurow and Richard Shepherd optioned the film rights to Capote's novella, they hired Sumner Locke Elliott to write its screenplay. Although this was generally faithful to the source material, Jurow and Shepherd disliked it and he was replaced by George Axelrod. Axelrod, who previously made structural changes to the source material while adapting The Seven Year Itch (1955), worked with Jurow and Shepherd to deviate from Capote's novella. This included altering its plot and tone to be a romantic comedy, replacing its unnamed gay narrator with a named, heterosexual male love interest, adding new characters, and reducing the gay subtext.

Capote wanted Marilyn Monroe to play Holly Golightly: he considered Monroe to best reflect the character, with Axelrod required to "tailor" the screenplay to accommodate Monroe. Monroe declined to star in the film, opting for The Misfits (1961), after theatre director Lee Strasberg advised her that playing a "lady of the evening" would be bad for her image. The role was then offered to Shirley MacLaine, who turned it down in favor of starring in Two Loves (1961), and Kim Novak also turned it down.

Capote was angry at the studio's eventual decision, remarking, "Paramount double-crossed me in every way and cast Audrey". Hepburn was hesitant to star in the film, citing difficulty playing an extroverted character. Steve McQueen was offered the role of Paul Varjak, but declined the offer due to being under contract with United Artists, and Jack Lemmon was also approached, but was unavailable. Robert Wagner was also considered. Eventually George Peppard was chosen, despite having appeared the previous year in the failed The Subterraneans.

The film's original director, John Frankenheimer, worked with Axelrod for three months on the project before he was replaced by Edwards after Hepburn's agent requested a higher-profile director. Edwards also supported Axelrod's changes to the novella, stating the changes made were for "audience approval".

=== Filming ===
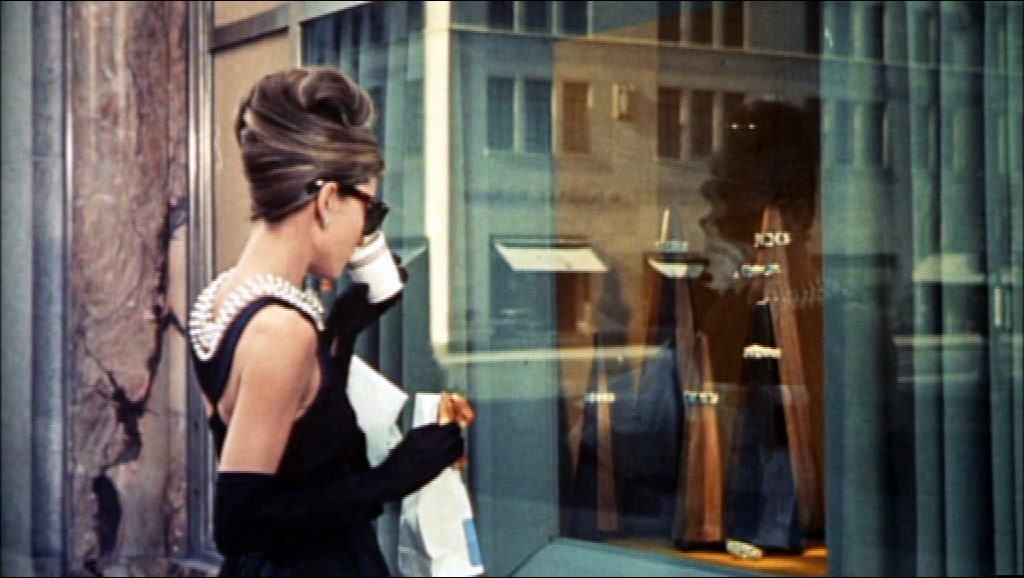
Hepburn outside the Tiffany & Co. flagship store during the film's opening sequence.

Filming began on Fifth Avenue outside the Tiffany & Co. flagship store on October 2, 1960 and concluded in December. Most of the exteriors were filmed in New York City, and all of the interiors, except for portions set inside Tiffany & Co., were filmed on the Paramount Studios lot in Hollywood.

According to one report, the film's on-location opening sequence outside Tiffany & Co. was extremely difficult to shoot, due to issues related to crowd control, Hepburn's dislike of pastries, and an accident that nearly resulted in the electrocution of a crew member. However, another report claims the sequence was captured rather quickly, owing to an unexpected lull in city traffic.

Hepburn's actual age during filming was 31, though Holly in the original novella is stated as being 19.

=== Music ===
It took me time to figure out what Holly Golightly was all about. I don't drink much, but I was sipping and it came to me one night. I wrote [the song] in half an hour.

— Henry Mancini on writing "Moon River".

During the film, Hepburn sang the film's signature song, "Moon River", written by Henry Mancini and Johnny Mercer. The song was tailored to Hepburn's limited vocal range and its sequencing was inspired by songs she performed in Funny Face (1957). After the film's test preview in San Francisco, Martin Rankin, Paramount's head of production, wanted "Moon River" replaced with music sung by somebody else. Shepherd claimed he and Jurow refused to replace it – a response attributed to Hepburn herself in another account.

According to Time, Mancini "sets off [the] melodies with a walking bass, extends them with choral and string variations and varies them with the brisk sounds of combo jazz. "Moon River" is sobbed by a plaintive harmonica, repeated by strings, hummed and then sung by the chorus and finally resolved with the harmonica." The soundtrack featured a score composed and conducted by Mancini, with several unreleased musical compositions not featuring in the final film. One piece, "Carousel Cue", appears in a deleted scene, while another piece titled "Outtake 1" also appears in a deleted scene. In 2013, Intrada Records released the complete score in its original film performance: as with many soundtrack albums from the time period, the album initially released alongside the film was a re-recording.

== Release ==
Breakfast at Tiffany's was theatrically released by Paramount Pictures on October 5, 1961.

=== Home media ===
The film was first released on VHS in 1989 and on DVD in 2001, and was one of the first films featuring Hepburn released on home video. On February 7, 2006, a 45th anniversary special edition DVD was released in North America, containing featurettes not included on the prior releases. These included a photo gallery, the film's theatrical trailer, a history featurette on Tiffany & Co., audio commentary by Shepherd, a making-of featurette with interviews from Edwards and Neal, and a tribute to Hepburn, which contained a letter written by Hepburn to Tiffany & Co. for their 150th anniversary in 1987.

On January 13, 2009, a remastered Centennial Collection version of the film was released on DVD, which added several new featurettes, including interviews with the cast, a documentary discussing the controversy regarding Rooney's portrayal of I.Y. Yunioshi, an interactive tour of the Paramount Studios lot where filming took place, and a tribute to Mancini. On June 29, 2011, the film was digitally restored in high-definition and released on Blu-ray to commemorate its 50th anniversary.

== Reception ==
=== Box office ===
Breakfast at Tiffany's was a commercial success, grossing $14 million on a $2.5 million budget. The film was screened at Radio City Music Hall before its theatrical release, where Variety called it "a bright box office contender".

=== Critical response ===
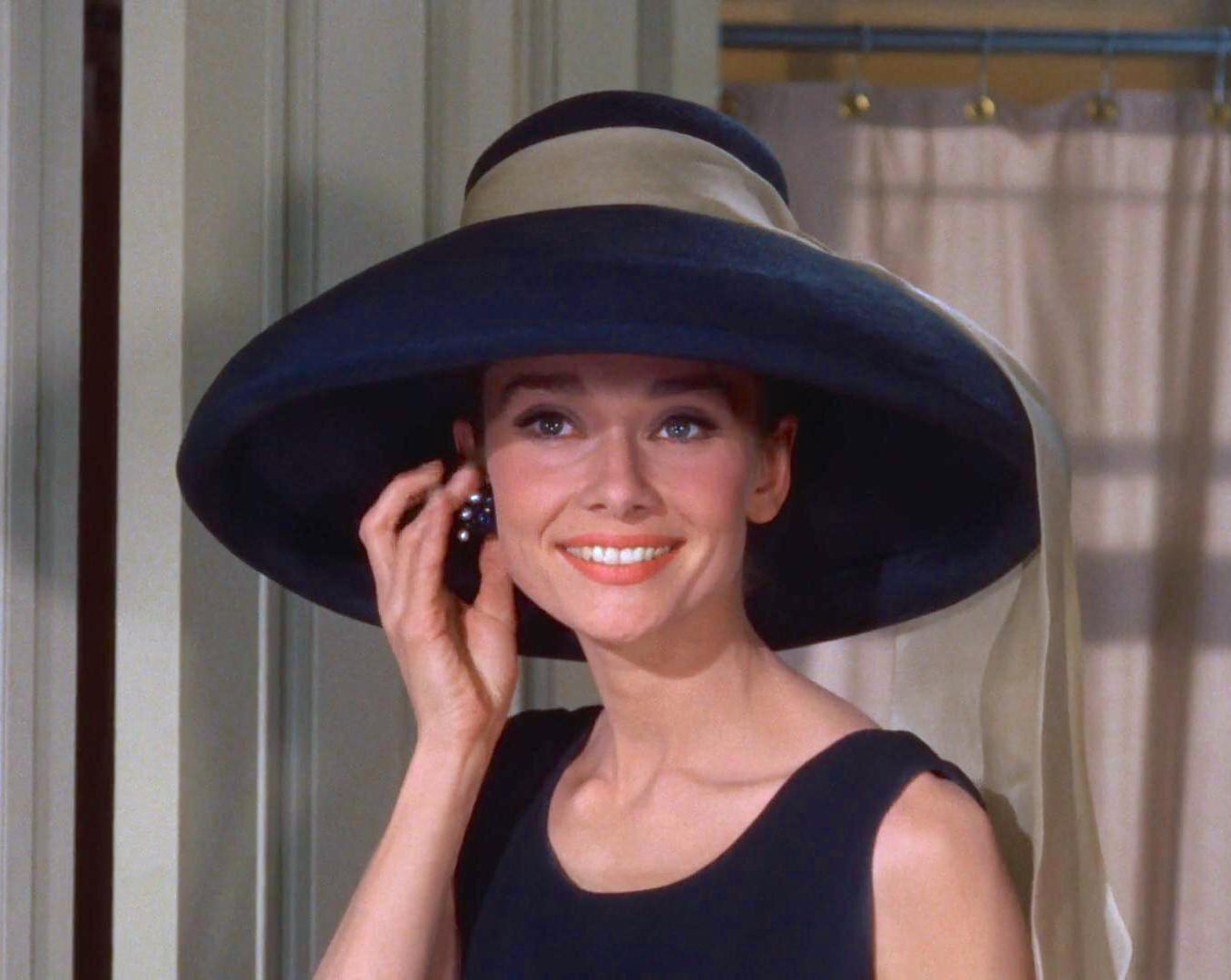
Audrey Hepburn's performance garnered widespread critical acclaim earning her a Best Actress nomination.

On the review aggregator website Rotten Tomatoes, 87% of 100 critics' reviews are positive. The website's consensus reads, "It contains some ugly anachronisms, but Blake Edwards is at his funniest in this iconic classic, and Audrey Hepburn absolutely lights up the screen." Metacritic, which uses a weighted average, assigned the film a score of 77 out of 100, based on 13 critics, indicating "generally favorable" reviews.

Time magazine noted "[Hepburn's portrayal] is not much different from Capote's [character]. She has kicked the weed but she is still jolly Holly who runs away to find some of the finer things of life." It also pointed out the differences from Capote's novella, stating "after that out-of-Capote beginning, Edwards goes on to an out-of-character end." Hepburn's performance received rave reviews, with it considered to be one of her most memorable and identifiable roles. Almost a half century later, Richard Corliss of Time emphasized the level of Hepburn's performance, stating, "Breakfast at Tiffany's set Hepburn on her Hollywood course" and argued her performance in the film influenced her later roles.

Tinee Mae of the Chicago Tribune also gave a positive review, saying, "In the wrong hands, the unconventional, disorganized, sophisticated, innocent, utterly contradictory [lead] character could be a tiresome idiot. Audrey makes her as sweet as she is silly, as appealing as she is affected, a playgirl without scruples, a moth who doesn't quite deserve to die in a flame." Mae also praised the "slick" and "perceptive" screenplay and the "fine" supporting cast, singling out Peppard, Ebsen, Balsam and Rooney. Henry T. Murdock of The Philadelphia Inquirer wrote, "Breakfast at Tiffany's shines like a gem. Much of the iridescence comes from the richly impulsive performance by Hepburn as the scatterbrained, pathetic, fiercely independent lead. [Peppard] plays with understanding. Ebsen appears briefly, but to good effect [and] Rooney is too slapstick as the Japanese photographer. Edwards keeps things moving with a lilt." The film helped rejuvenate Ebsen's career, as it helped him land the role as Jed Clampett on The Beverly Hillbillies (1962–1971).

A.H. Weiler of The New York Times called the film a "completely unbelievable but wholly captivating flight into fancy composed of unequal dollops of comedy, romance, poignancy, funny colloquialisms and Manhattan's swankiest East Side areas captured in the loveliest of colors". Weiler called Hepburn "a genuinely charming, elfin waif who will be believed and adored when seen" and further praised the performances of Peppard, Balsam, Rooney, Neal and Ebsen. Capote disliked the film and Hepburn's performance for deviating from his novella. Capote's biographer, Gerald Clarke, characterized the film as a "valentine to free-spirited women, [not] a cautionary tale about a little girl lost in the big city". He later labelled the film "a sugar and spice confection" and claimed Capote praised it as an independent work, but not as an adaptation. In later years, American Film Institute ranked the film No. 61 in 100 Years ... 100 Passions and "Moon River" as No. 4 in 100 Years ... 100 Songs. The film was also ranked No. 486 on Empire's The 500 Greatest Movies of All Time list.

=== Accolades ===
Award	Category	Nominee(s)	Result	Ref.
Academy Awards	Best Actress	Audrey Hepburn	Nominated	
Academy Awards	Best Screenplay – Based on Material from Another Medium	George Axelrod	Nominated	
Academy Awards	Best Art Direction – Color	Art Direction: Hal Pereira and Roland Anderson; Set Decoration: Samuel M. Comer and Ray Moyer	Nominated	
Academy Awards	Best Music Score of a Dramatic or Comedy Picture	Henry Mancini	Won	
Academy Awards	Best Song	"Moon River"; Music by Henry Mancini; Lyrics by Johnny Mercer	Won	
Bambi Awards	Best Actress – International	Audrey Hepburn	Nominated	
David di Donatello Awards	Best Foreign Actress	Audrey Hepburn	Won	
Directors Guild of America Awards	Outstanding Directorial Achievement in Motion Pictures	Blake Edwards	Nominated	
Golden Globe Awards	Best Motion Picture – Comedy		Nominated	
Golden Globe Awards	Best Actress in a Motion Picture – Musical or Comedy	Audrey Hepburn	Nominated	
Grammy Awards	Album of the Year (Other Than Classical)	Breakfast at Tiffany's – Henry Mancini	Nominated	
Grammy Awards	Record of the Year	"Moon River" – Henry Mancini	Won	
Grammy Awards	Song of the Year	"Moon River" – Henry Mancini and Johnny Mercer	Won	
Grammy Awards	Best Arrangement	"Moon River" – Henry Mancini	Won	
Grammy Awards	Best Performance by an Orchestra – for Other Than Dancing	Breakfast at Tiffany's – Henry Mancini	Won	
Grammy Awards	Best Sound Track Album or Recording of Score from Motion Picture or Television	Breakfast at Tiffany's – Henry Mancini	Won	
International Film Music Critics Association Awards	Best Archival Release of an Existing Score – Re-Release or Re-Recording	Music by Henry Mancini; Album Produced by Douglass Fake and Roger Feigelson; Liner Notes by Jeff Bond; Album Art Direction by Joe Sikoryak	Nominated	
Laurel Awards	Top Comedy		Nominated	
Laurel Awards	Top Female Comedy Performance	Audrey Hepburn	Nominated	
Laurel Awards	Top Musical Score	Henry Mancini	Nominated	
Laurel Awards	Top Song	"Moon River"; Music by Henry Mancini; Lyrics by Johnny Mercer	Won	
National Film Preservation Board	National Film Registry		Inducted	
Satellite Awards	Best Classic DVD		Nominated	
Writers Guild of America Awards	Best Written American Comedy	George Axelrod	Won	

== Influence ==
The image of Hepburn with her hair in a high chignon and carrying an oversized cigarette holder is considered one of the most iconic images of 20th century American cinema. The sunglasses worn by Hepburn, another popular item, were designed and manufactured in London by Oliver Goldsmith. In 2011, the sunglasses were re-released to mark the film's 50th anniversary. One of three dresses designed by Givenchy for Hepburn to use in the film sold at auction by Christie's on December 5, 2006, for £467,200 (~US$947,000), about seven times the reserve price.

The black Givenchy dress worn by Hepburn is cited as one of the most iconic clothing items of the twentieth century and was described by Glamour as the most famous little black dress of all time. A second little black dress by Givenchy, which was styled with a wide-brimmed hat, influenced the comic book design for Catwoman by artist Adam Hughes and later inspired the costume for the character in The Dark Knight Rises (2012).

== Controversy ==
Since the 1990s, Rooney's portrayal of I. Y. Yunioshi, which featured makeup and a prosthetic mouthpiece, has been labelled as a caricature of a Japanese man. In the Bruce Lee biopic Dragon: The Bruce Lee Story (1993), Breakfast at Tiffany's is used as an illustration of Hollywood's racist depiction of East Asians: it is claimed that Lee and his future wife, Linda Lee Cadwell, walked out of a screening of the film upon viewing Rooney's performance.

Promotional materials released by Paramount for the film between October and December 1960 did not reveal Rooney to play Yunioshi, with press releases stating that an upcoming Japanese comedian named "Ohayo Arigatou" ("good morning" and "thank you" in Japanese) would play the character. Other press releases featured false quotes, written in phonetically broken English, attributed to the fake comedian. Rooney eventually revealed his involvement in Breakfast at Tiffany's in a statement while wearing the makeup and prosthetic mouthpiece seen in the film.

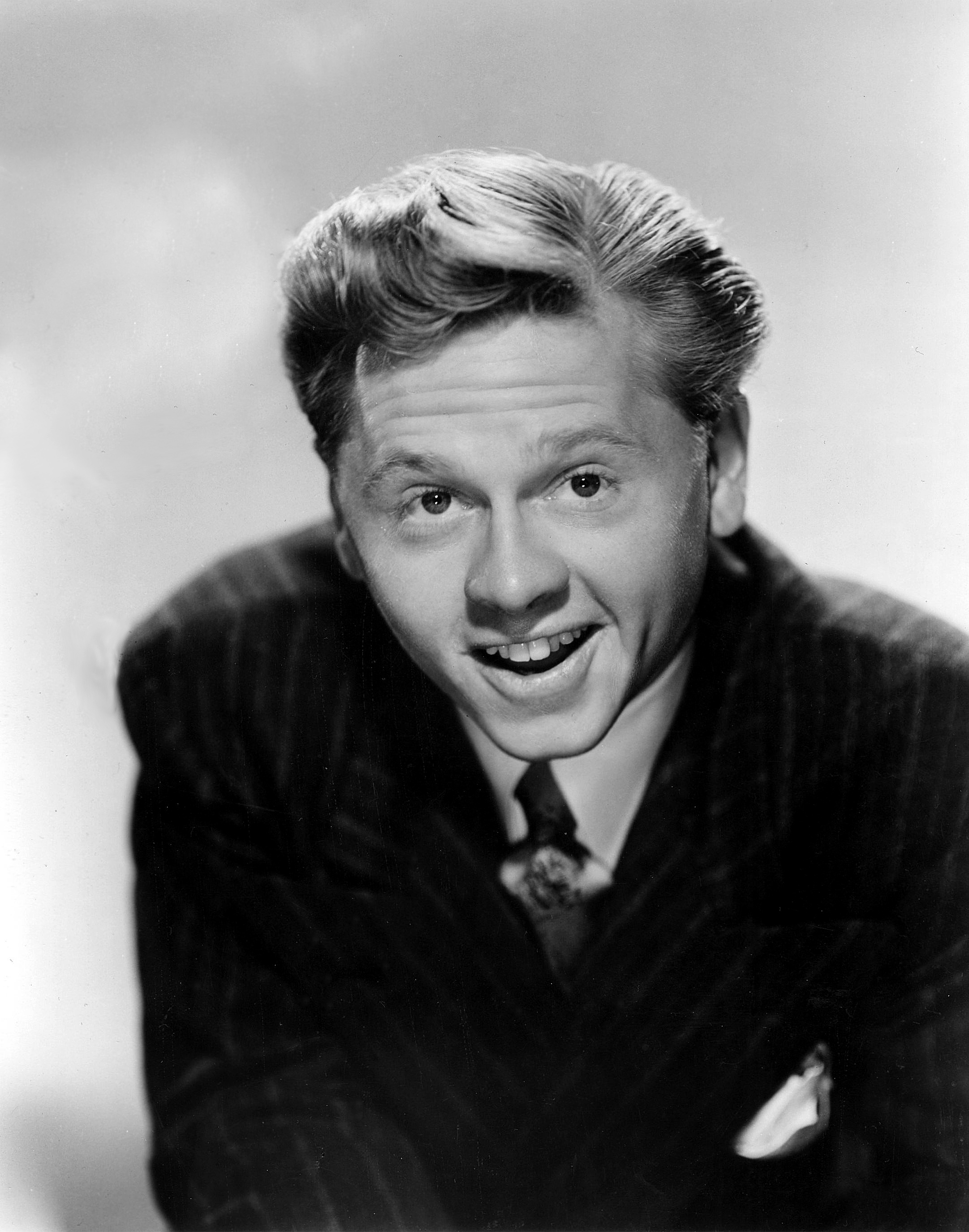
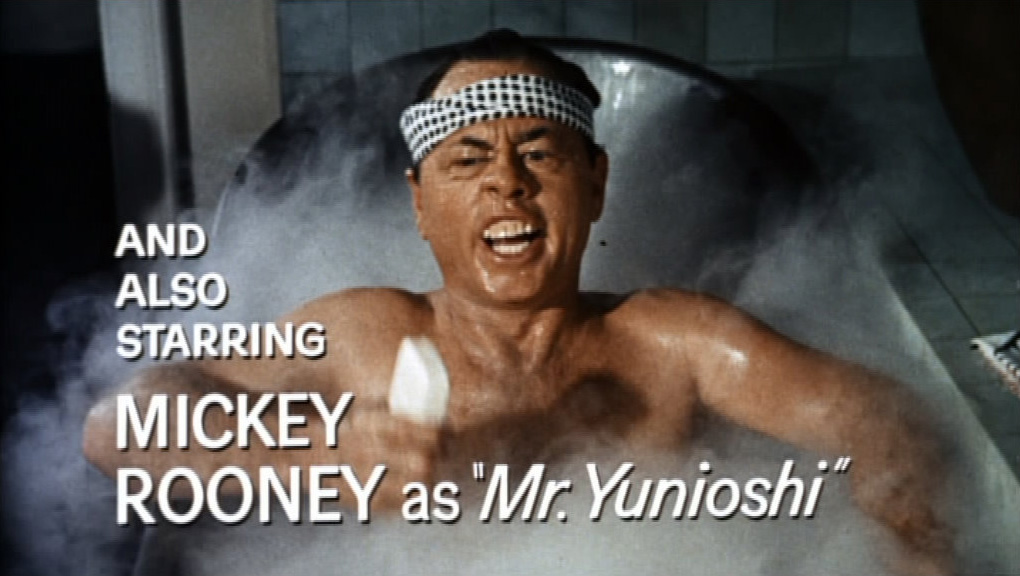
Mickey Rooney wore makeup and a prosthetic mouthpiece to portray a Japanese character.

Shepherd later said that he wanted to recast the role, "not because he [Rooney] didn't play the part well" but to have a Japanese actor play Mr. Yunioshi instead, though Edwards overruled him. Shepherd later apologized for Rooney's casting and performance, saying, "If we could just change Mickey, I'd be thrilled with the [film]." Although Axelrod expanded the role of Yunioshi in the screenplay compared to the novella, Edwards sought to use the character for comic relief and hired Rooney, his old roommate. Axelrod clashed with Edwards regarding the placement of Yunioshi in the film and convinced Hepburn to reshoot scenes for free in the hope that scenes featuring Yunioshi could be edited out, but was overruled by Edwards. Edwards later stated he "would give anything to recast [Rooney]" and he "wished [he] had never done it" but stressed it was not something he could "undo".

In a 2008 interview, Rooney said he was "heartbroken" regarding the criticism, saying, "Edwards wanted me to [portray] the character because he was a comedy director. We had fun doing it. Never [since] we made it [has] there been [any] complaints. Every place I've gone in the world people say [I] was so funny." Rooney later said that he would not have taken the role if he thought it was offensive.

The film continues to draw criticism for the character, with film historian Robert Osborne calling it "such a racial slur. I blame Edwards. The caricature was totally embarrassing". In 2011, a group of Asian-American viewers opposed a screening held by SyFy and the Brooklyn Bridge Park Corporation to commemorate the film because of the character.

== Adaptations ==
In 2004, a musical adaptation of the film made its debut at The Muny in St. Louis. In May 2009, Anna Friel starred in a London stage adaptation that opened in September 2009 at the Haymarket Theatre. In March 2013, a new stage adaptation made its debut at the Cort Theater in New York City, starring Emilia Clarke.

== See also ==
- Male prostitution in the arts
- Portrayal of East Asians in Hollywood
- Whitewashing in film
- List of Academy Award–winning films
- List of American films of 1961
- List of Audrey Hepburn credits
- List of comedy films of the 1960s
- List of films set in New York City
- List of Paramount Pictures films
- List of short fiction made into feature films
- Breakfast at Tiffany's (musical)
