= Cat Stevens discography =

- Stevens at the Glastonbury Festival 2023
- Studio albums: 17
- Soundtrack albums: 1
- Live albums: 6
- Compilation albums: 34
- Singles: 57
- Music videos: 21

The discography of British singer and songwriter Cat Stevens (also known as Yusuf, Yusuf Islam, and Yusuf / Cat Stevens) consists of 17 studio albums, one soundtrack album, six live albums, 34 compilation albums, 57 singles, four video albums, and 21 music videos.

In March 1967, Cat Stevens's debut album Matthew & Son was released by Deram Records, followed by New Masters later that year. In 1968, Stevens contracted tuberculosis, putting a stop to his career. He would emerge with a new sound, beard, and a contract with Island. In the years following, he recorded several hit albums, including Mona Bone Jakon (1970), Tea for the Tillerman (1970), Teaser and the Firecat (1971), Catch Bull at Four (1972), Foreigner (1973), and Buddha and the Chocolate Box (1974). In June 1974, while in Australia, Cat Stevens was presented with a plaque representing the sale of 40 Gold Records, the largest number ever presented to an artist in Australia. He also recorded the soundtrack for the film Harold and Maude during this time.

As the 1970s progressed, he continued to release albums (Numbers, Izitso, and Back to Earth) but these were not as well received as their predecessors. In December 1977, after a long quest for spiritual truth, Stevens converted to the religion of Islam. He would change his name to Yusuf Islam and disappear out of the public eye for years. In the late 1990s and early 2000s, he recorded some Islamic music, most of which would later be compiled into the compilation Footsteps in the Light (2006). In 2006, he returned to secular music with the album An Other Cup. Since then, he has continued to release new music.

== Albums ==
=== As Cat Stevens ===
==== Studio albums ====
Year	Album details	Peak chart positions										Certifications
Year	Album details	UK	AUS	AUT	CAN	GER	NOR	NZ	SPA	SWE	US	Certifications
Matthew & Son	* Released: 10 March 1967: Label: Deram	7	—	—	—	—	—	—	—	—	173	
New Masters	Released: 15 December 1967; Label: Deram	—	—	—	—	—	—	—	—	—	—	
Mona Bone Jakon	* Released: 24 April 1970: Label: Island/A&M	63	25	—	—	—	—	—	—	—	164	RIAA: Gold
Tea for the Tillerman	Released: 23 November 1970; Label: Island/A&M	20	2	13	11	22	25	20	—	—	8	BPI: Gold; ARIA: Platinum; RIAA: 3× Platinum
Teaser and the Firecat	* Released: 1 October 1971: Label: Island/A&M	2	1	—	2	23	2	25	2	—	2	BPI: Gold; RIAA: 3× Platinum
Catch Bull at Four	* Released: 27 September 1972: Label: Island/A&M	2	1	—	1	17	3	—	2	—	1	RIAA: Platinum
Foreigner	* Released: 25 July 1973: Label: Island/A&M	3	4	—	5	18	1	—	1	—	3	BPI: Gold; RIAA: Gold
Buddha and the Chocolate Box	* Released: March 1974: Label: Island/A&M	3	5	3	3	34	5	—	2	—	2	BPI: Gold; RIAA: Platinum
Numbers	* Released: November 1975: Label: Island/A&M	—	85	—	4	20	14	—	12	9	13	MC: Gold; RIAA: Gold
Izitso	* Released: 28 May 1977: Label: Island/A&M	18	39	12	2	7	13	39	10	15	7	BPI: Silver; MC: Gold; RIAA: Gold
Back to Earth	* Released: 1 December 1978: Label: Island/A&M	—	89	—	31	32	17	—	14	—	33	
"—" denotes releases that did not chart

==== Live albums ====
Year	Album details	Peak positions	Certifications
Year	Album details	US	Certifications
1974	Saturnight: Released: 8 November 1974; Worldwide release: 29 November 2024; Label: A&M (Japan); Label (re-release): A&M/Cat-O-Log	—	
2004	Majikat: Released: 21 September 2004; Label: Eagle	—	ARIA: 3× Platinum
2008	Tea for the Tillerman: Live (DVD): Released: 2 September 2008; Label: Wienerworld UK	—	
"—" denotes releases that did not chart

==== Compilation albums ====
Year	Album details	Peak chart positions										Certifications
Year	Album details	UK	AUS	AUT	CAN	GER	NOR	NZ	SPA	SWE	US	Certifications
1970	The World of Cat Stevens: Released: 1970; Label: Decca	—	—	—	—	—	—	—	—	—	—	
1971	Matthew & Son / New Masters: Released: 1971; Label: Deram	—	—	—	—	—	—	—	—	—	173	
1971	Very Young and Early Songs: Released: 1 November 1971; Label: Deram	—	—	—	—	—	—	—	—	—	94	
1972	The View from the Top: Released: 1972; Label: Deram	—	—	—	—	—	—	—	—	—	—	
1972	Harold and Maude: Released: 1972; Label: A&M (Japan)	—	—	—	—	—	—	—	—	—	—	
1973	The Best of Cat Stevens: Released: 1973; Label: Deram	—	—	—	—	—	—	—	—	—	—	
1973	Cat Stevens: Released: 1973; Label: Decca	—	—	—	—	—	—	—	—	—	—	
1975	Greatest Hits: Released: 20 June 1975; Label: Island/A&M	2	41	—	1	—	14	—	19	5	6	BPI: Gold; RIAA: 4× Platinum
1975	20 Super Hits by Cat Stevens: Released: 1975; Label: Decca	—	—	—	—	—	—	—	—	—	—	
1977	Cat's Cradle: Released: 1977; Label: London Records	—	—	—	—	—	—	—	—	—	—	
1978	The Best of Cat Stevens Volume 2: Released: 1978; Label: Decca	—	—	—	—	—	—	—	—	—	—	
1981	Morning Has Broken: Released: 1981; Label: Island	—	—	12	—	5	—	—	—	—	—	
1984	Footsteps in the Dark: Greatest Hits, Vol. 2: Released: November 1984; Label: Island/A&M	—	3	—	—	—	—	—	—	—	165	RIAA: Gold; ARIA: Platinum
1985	The Collection: Released: 1985; Label: Castle Communications	—	—	—	—	—	—	—	—	—	—	
1987	Classics, Volume 24: Released: 1987; Label: A&M	—	—	—	—	—	—	—	—	—	—	RIAA: Gold
1989	First Cuts: Released: 1989; Label: Deram	—	—	—	—	—	—	—	—	—	—	
1990	The Very Best of Cat Stevens: Released: 1990; Label: Island	—	6	22	—	8	—	—	—	—	—	ARIA 3× Platinum
1993	The Early Tapes: Released: 1993; Label: Deram/Spectrum Music	—	—	—	—	—	—	—	—	—	—	
1996	Three - Numbers, Izitso, Back to Earth: Released: 1996; Label: Mobile Fidelity Sound Lab	—	—	—	—	—	—	—	—	—	—	
1999	Remember Cat Stevens – The Ultimate Collection: Released: 1999; Label: Island	31	10	12	—	20	5	5	13	11	—	BPI: Gold; ARIA: 7× Platinum
2000	The Very Best of Cat Stevens: Released: 2000; Label: Island/A&M	6	6	44	—	89	—	7	19	2	58	BPI: 3× Platinum; MC: Platinum; RIAA: Gold
2001	Cat Stevens (box set) aka In Search of the Centre of the Universe and On the Road to Find Out: Released: 2001, repackaging 2008; Label: A&M	—	—	—	—	—	—	—	—	—	—	
2005	Gold: Released: 15 November 2005; Label: Island/A&M	—	—	—	—	—	—	—	—	—	—	
2005	Chronicles: Released: 2005; Label: A&M	—	—	—	—	—	—	—	—	—	—	
2007	20th Century Masters: The Millennium Collection – The Best of Cat Stevens: Released: 1 May 2007; Label: A&M	—	—	—	40	—	—	—	—	—	—	
2007	Harold and Maude Soundtrack by Cat Stevens: Released: 28 December 2007; Label: Vinyl Films	—	—	—	—	—	—	—	—	—	173	
2010	4 Original Albums: Released: 20 December 2010; Label: Island/A&M	—	—	—	—	—	—	—	—	60	—	
2011	Icon: Released: 2011; Label: Universal Music	—	—	—	—	—	—	—	—	—	—	
2012	The Collection: Released: 2012; Label: Universal Music Australia	—	—	—	—	—	—	—	—	—	—	
"—" denotes releases that did not chart

=== As Yusuf Islam ===
==== Studio albums ====
- 1995: The Life of the Last Prophet
- 1999: Prayers of the Last Prophet
- 2000: A Is for Allah
- 2001: Bismillah
- 2002: In Praise of the Last Prophet
- 2003: I Look I See
- 2008: I Look, I See 2
- 2014: The Story of Adam and Creation

==== Live albums ====
- 2004: Night of Remembrance (Live at the Royal Albert Hall)

==== Compilation albums ====
- 2000: I Have No Cannons That Roar
- 2006: Footsteps in the Light
- 2008: Various Artists, Songs for Survival (contributed one track—"Edge of Existence")

==== Singles ====
- 2003: Peace Train '03 / Angel of War
- 2005: Indian Ocean

=== As Yusuf ===
==== Studio albums ====
Year	Album details	Peak chart positions										Certifications
Year	Album details	UK	AUS	AUT	GER	FRA	NLD	NOR	SWE	SWI	US	Certifications
2006	An Other Cup: Released: November 2006; Label: Ya/Polydor/Atlantic	20	—	2	2	81	69	17	16	14	52	BPI: Gold; BVMI: 3× Gold
2009	Roadsinger: Released: 1 May 2009; Label: Ya/Island/Hip-O	10	35	10	9	88	71	—	41	43	41	BPI: Gold
2014	Tell 'Em I'm Gone: Released: 28 October 2014; Label: Legacy Recordings	22	24	15	26	90	—	—	—	39	24	
"—" denotes releases that did not chart

==== Live albums ====
Year	Album details	Certification
2007	Yusuf's Cafe Session (DVD): Released: March 2007; Label: Hip-O	
2010	Roadsinger: Live in Australia (Blu-ray): Released: 7 December 2010; Label: Ais	ARIA: Platinum

=== As Yusuf / Cat Stevens ===
==== Studio albums ====
Year	Album details	Peak chart positions							
Year	Album details	UK	AUS	AUT	GER	FRA	SPA	SWI	US
2017	The Laughing Apple: Released: 15 September 2017; Label: Cat-O-Log/Decca	23	59	26	4	139	79	33	114
2020	Tea for the Tillerman 2: Released: 18 September 2020; Label: Cat-O-Log/Decca	4	50	—	—	161	—	45	85
2023	King of a Land: Released: 16 June 2023; Label: BMG/Dark Horse	49	—	32	10	—	—	32	—
"—" denotes releases that did not chart

==== Compilation albums ====
Year	Album details	Peak chart positions							
Year	Album details	UK	AUS	AUT	GER	FRA	SPA	SWI	US
2025	On the Road to Findout: Greatest Hits: Released: 17 September 2025; Label: Cat-O-Log/A&M/Ume	—	—	—	—	—	—	—	—
"—" denotes releases that did not chart

== Singles ==
=== As Cat Stevens ===
Year	Single / B-side	Peak chart positions										Album
Year	Single / B-side	UK	AUS	CAN	CAN AC	GER	NLD	NZ	SPA	US	US AC	Album
1966	"I Love My Dog" b/w "Portobello Road"	28	—	47	—	—	21	—	—	118	—	Matthew and Son
1966	"Matthew and Son" b/w "Granny"	2	11	84	—	25	—	1	20	115	—	Matthew and Son
1967	"I'm Gonna Get Me a Gun" b/w "School is Out"	6	54	—	—	—	—	4	—	—	—	Non-album singles
1967	"A Bad Night" b/w "The Laughing Apple"	20	87	—	—	—	30	15	—	—	—	Non-album singles
1967	"Kitty" (Note: Kitty did not enter the RPM Top 100, but peaked at number 26 on the CHUM Chart, 4 March 1968) b/w "Blackness of the Night"	47	—	—	—	—	—	6	—	—	—	New Masters
1968	"Lovely City (When Do You Laugh?)" b/w "Image of Hell"	—	100	—	—	—	—	—	—	—	—	Non-album singles
1968	"Here Comes My Wife" b/w "It's a Super (Dupa) Life"	—	—	—	—	—	—	12	—	—	—	Non-album singles
1969	"Where Are You" b/w "The View from the Top"	—	—	—	—	—	—	—	—	—	—	Non-album singles
1970	"Lady D'Arbanville" b/w "I Wish, I Wish"	8	20	69	—	23	2	16	11	—	—	Mona Bone Jakon
1970	"Father and Son" b/w "Moonshadow"	52 (Note: Chart position is from the official UK "Breakers List".)	18	—	—	—	28	—	—	—	—	Tea for the Tillerman
1971	"Wild World" b/w "Miles from Nowhere"	52 (Note: Chart entry in 2007.)	—	14	32	—	—	—	—	11	21	Tea for the Tillerman
1971	"Moonshadow" b/w "Father and Son"	22	—	26	20	—	—	—	—	30	10	Teaser and the Firecat
1971	"Ruby Love" b/w "Miles from Nowhere" (FR, GR) "Longer Boats" (DE, ES, Benelux)	—	—	—	—	—	—	—	—	—	—	Teaser and the Firecat
1971	"Tuesday's Dead" b/w "Miles from Nowhere"	—	—	—	—	—	—	—	—	—	—	Teaser and the Firecat
1971	"Sad Lisa" b/w "Wild World"	—	—	—	—	—	—	—	—	—	—	Teaser and the Firecat
1971	"Peace Train" b/w "Where Do the Children Play?" (US, CA, Europe) "Tuesday's Dead" (UK)	—	3	3	22	—	7	2	—	7	1	Teaser and the Firecat
1972	"Morning Has Broken" b/w "I Want to Live in a Wigwam"	9	4	4	11	37	5	3	13	6	1	Teaser and the Firecat
1972	"Sitting" b/w "Crab Dance"	—	34	14	38	—	—	4	—	16	17	Catch Bull at Four
1973	"Can't Keep It In" b/w "Crab Dance"	13	82	—	—	36	—	—	—	—	—	Catch Bull at Four
1973	"The Hurt" b/w "Silent Sunlight"	—	30	25	27	—	—	—	17	31	38	Foreigner
1974	"Oh Very Young" b/w "100 I Dream"	—	19	9	6	47	—	10	—	10	2	Buddha and the Chocolate Box
1974	"Another Saturday Night" b/w "Home in the Sky"	19	15	1	16	37	27	10	—	6	12	Non-album single
1974	"Ready" b/w "I Think I See the Light"	—	—	20	—	—	—	—	—	26	—	Buddha and the Chocolate Box
1975	"Two Fine People" b/w "A Bad Penny"	—	76	34	23	—	—	—	—	33	39	Greatest Hits
1976	"Banapple Gas" b/w "Ghost Town"	—	59	65	—	37	7	—	—	41	—	Numbers
1977	"(Remember the Days of the) Old School Yard" b/w "The Doves"	44	18	27	14	—	—	—	—	33	28	Izitso
1977	"Was Dog a Doughnut?" b/w "Sweet Jamaica"	—	—	79	—	—	—	—	—	70	—	Izitso
1977	"(I Never Wanted) To Be a Star" b/w "The Doves"	—	—	—	—	—	—	—	—	—	—	Izitso
1977	"Sweet Jamaica"	—	—	98	35	—	—	—	—	—	—	Izitso
1978	"Child for a Day" b/w "Kypros"	—	—	—	—	—	—	—	—	—	—	Izitso
1979	"New York Times" b/w "Nascimento"	—	—	—	—	—	—	—	22	—	—	Back to Earth
1979	"Bad Brakes" b/w "Nascimento"	—	—	—	—	—	—	—	—	83	—	Back to Earth
1979	"Randy" b/w "Nascimento"	—	—	—	—	—	—	—	—	—	—	Back to Earth
1979	"Last Love Song" b/w "Nascimento"	—	—	—	—	—	—	—	—	—	—	Back to Earth
1984	"If You Want to Sing Out, Sing Out" b/w "I Want to Live in a Wigwam" (US) "Daytime" (ES)	—	—	—	—	—	—	—	—	—	—	Footsteps in the Dark: Greatest Hits, Vol. 2
2019	"Toy Heart"	—	—	—	—	—	—	—	—	—	—	Back to Earth (Super Deluxe Box Set)
2020	"Butterfly"	—	—	—	—	—	—	—	—	—	—	Back to Earth (Super Deluxe Box Set)
"—" denotes releases that did not chart

=== As Yusuf / Cat Stevens ===
Year	Single	Peak chart positions							Album
Year	Single	UK	AUT	GER	IRE	NLD	SWE	SWI	Album
2003	"Peace Train" b/w "Angel of War"	—	—	—	—	—	—	—	Single
2004	"Father and Son" (with Ronan Keating)	2	41	27	16	84	37	41	Ronan Keating's album 10 Years of Hits
2005	"Indian Ocean"	—	—	—	—	—	—	—	Gold
2006	"Heaven / Where True Love Goes"	—	—	—	—	—	—	—	An Other Cup
2006	"Midday (Avoid City After Dark)"	—	—	—	—	—	—	—	An Other Cup
2007	"Maybe There's a World"	—	—	—	—	—	—	—	An Other Cup
2009	"Thinking 'Bout You"	—	—	—	—	—	—	—	Roadsinger
2009	"The Day the World Gets 'Round" (with Klaus Voormann)	—	—	—	—	—	—	—	A Sideman's Journey
2009	"Roadsinger" / "Boots and Sand" (featuring Paul McCartney and Dolly Parton)	—	—	—	—	—	—	—	Roadsinger
2011	"My People"	—	—	—	—	—	—	—	Non-album single
2014	"Dying to Live"	—	—	—	—	—	—	—	Tell 'Em I'm Gone
2016	"I Love My Dog" / "Matthew and Son"	—	—	—	—	—	—	—	Non-album singles
2016	"He Was Alone"	—	—	—	—	—	—	—	Non-album singles
2017	"See What Love Did to Me"	—	—	—	—	—	—	—	The Laughing Apple
2017	"Blackness of the Night"	—	—	—	—	—	—	—	The Laughing Apple
2017	"Northern Wind (Death of Billy the Kid)"	—	—	—	—	—	—	—	The Laughing Apple
2017	"You Can Do (Whatever)!"	—	—	—	—	—	—	—	The Laughing Apple
2017	"Mary and the Little Lamb"	—	—	—	—	—	—	—	The Laughing Apple
2020	"Where Do the Children Play?"	—	—	—	—	—	—	—	Tea for the Tillerman²
2020	"On the Road to Find Out"	—	—	—	—	—	—	—	Tea for the Tillerman²
2020	"Father and Son"	—	—	—	—	—	—	—	Tea for the Tillerman²
2023	"Here Comes the Sun"	—	—	—	—	—	—	—	Non-album single
2023	"Take The World Apart"	—	—	—	—	—	—	—	King of a Land
2023	"King of a Land"	—	—	—	—	—	—	—	King of a Land
2023	"All Nights, All Days"	—	—	—	—	—	—	—	King of a Land
"—" denotes releases that did not chart

== Music videos ==
=== As Cat Stevens ===
Year	Title	Album
1970	"Lady D'Arbanville"	Mona Bone Jakon
1970	"Father and Son"	Tea for the Tillerman
1972	"Moonshadow" (animated short film)	Teaser and the Firecat
1976	"Banapple Gas"	Numbers
1977	"(Remember the Days of the) Old School Yard"	Izitso

=== As Yusuf / Cat Stevens ===
Year	Title	Album
2006	"Midday (Avoid City After Dark)"	An Other Cup
2009	"Roadsinger (To Warm You Through the Night)"	Roadsinger
2009	"Thinking 'Bout You"	Roadsinger
2009	"Boots and Sand" (with only the voices of Paul McCartney and Dolly Parton)	Roadsinger
2011	"My People"	non-album
2014	"You Are My Sunshine"	Tell 'Em I'm Gone
2014	"Gold Digger"	Tell 'Em I'm Gone
2017	"Mary Had a Little Lamb" (animated)	The Laughing Apple
2020	"Where Do the Children Play?" (re-recorded) (animated)	Tea for the Tillerman²
2020	"Wild World" (re-recorded)	Tea for the Tillerman²
2020	"On the Road to Find Out" (re-recorded)	Tea for the Tillerman²
2020	"Tea for the Tillerman" (re-recorded) (animated)	Tea for the Tillerman²
2023	"Take the World Apart" (lyric video)	King of a Land
2023	"King of a Land" (animated)	King of a Land
2023	"All Nights, All Days" (animated)	King of a Land
2023	"Another Night in the Rain" (animated)	King of a Land
