= Blackness of the Night =

1967 song written and recorded by Cat Stevens

- British single label

Single by Cat Stevens

from the album New Masters
- A-side: "Kitty"
- Released: 1 December 1967
- Recorded: 3 November 1967
- Studio: Decca, London
- Genre: Folk-pop
- Length: 2:25
- Label: Deram
- Songwriter: Cat Stevens
- Producer: Mike Hurst

Cat Stevens singles chronology
"A Bad Night" (1967)	"Kitty" / "Blackness of the Night" (1967)	"Lovely City (When Do You Laugh?)" (1968)

Audio
- "Blackness of the Night" on YouTube

"Blackness of the Night" is a song written and recorded by British singer-songwriter Cat Stevens in 1967. Stevens was inspired by his childhood, growing up in London during the aftermath of World War II. The song was recorded in November 1967 at Decca Studios. Musically, the song is in the key of C major and is a folk-pop song that features acoustic guitar and a sparse string arrangement. Lyrically, it is a protest song that alludes to lost innocence. Deram Records initially released "Blackness of the Night" as the B-side of Stevens' single "Kitty" on 1 December 1967, and included it on his second studio album New Masters two weeks later. Critical reception of the song was good, with retrospective assessment comparing the track favorably with Stevens' later, more acclaimed output. Stevens re-recorded the song for his studio album The Laughing Apple in 2017.

== Composition and recording ==
In 2017, Cat Stevens recalled to Entertainment Weekly that he wrote "Blackness of the Night" as one of his first protest song in direct response to his childhood in London, growing up in the aftermath of World War II. According to Stevens, "the memories were strong and bombed ruins still riddled the City", something which was reflected in the song's lyrics about the solitude in wandering the streets alone. He reflected that it was written "in anger" about the "injustices of the world". "Blackness of the Night", alongside "Northern Wind" and "My Motorbike", were recorded during the final recording session for Stevens' second studio album New Masters on 3 November 1967 at Decca Studios in West Hampstead, London. (Note: "My Motorbike" was later erased from the tape and not released as part of New Masters.) The recording was produced by Mike Hurst with Ivor Raymonde acting as the music director. (Note: Although retrospective production credit for "Blackness of the Night" was given to Mike Hurst on the New Masters album, and retrospectively, on the original single release Dick Rowe was errorenously credited as a producer.)

As originally recorded by Stevens in 1967, "Blackness of the Night" has a runtime of 2:25, the song was written in the key of C major. The song largely employs a I–V–vi–IV progression, with the chords of F and G being alternatively used in the title phrase. Musically, "Blackness of the Night" is a folk-pop song that features an introduction on acoustic guitar alongside an organ solo. According to biographer George Brown, the song is more "sparsely arranged" in comparison to the other material Stevens' recorded at the time, with the string section not appearing in prominence until the second half. Lyrically, it is a protest song, which includes "aches of lost innocence", allusions to child soldiers, broken families and waning hope. It relates to a fugitive driven out of his community, who is wandering "endlessly" at night.

== Release ==
"Blackness of the Night" initially saw release as the B-side of Stevens' fifth single "Kitty" through Deram Records on 1 December 1967. (Note: Catalogue number Deram DM 156.) According to Brown, with "Kitty" being a more upbeat orchestral pop song, "Blackness of the Night" complemented it with "contrasting, moody gloom". The single reached number 47 on the Record Retailer chart in the UK. Two weeks later on 15 December 1967 both sides of the single were included on Stevens' second studio album New Masters, (Note: Mono catalogue number DML 1018, stereo catalogue number SML 1018.) where "Blackness of the Night" was sequenced as the tenth track between "Ceylon City" and "Come on Baby (Shift that Log)". In addition to appearing on the CD reissues of New Masters, "Blackness of the Night" has also appeared on several compilation albums, including the box set In Search of the Centre of the Universe in 2001.

== Reception and legacy ==
My folkie protest song, which I thought came out really nice. Again, it was a bit over-arranged, but it's still one of my favorite tracks from that time, because of the words

— Cat Stevens about "Blackness of the Night" (2001)

Upon original release, "Blackness of the Night" received primarily positive reviews in the press. In the New Musical Express, journalist Derek Johnson wrote that it had a "philosophic quality" and noted it to be a plaintive song. Peter Jones from Record Mirror noted that the song was "folksy" in contrast to its A-side. Jones and Norman Jopling also single it out as one of New Masters' most "striking" songs upon release. On the contrary, Gareth Jones from the Melton Mowbray Times wrote that the track was "good" albeit a bit "uninspired".

According to Noel Coppage of Stereo Review, "Blackness of the Night" still "sounded brand new" and found that not many songs released in 1972 could top the track, stating that it has a melody that "compares favorably with the bulk of Jacques Brel's work", alongside lyrics that were as pretty as "some of" Lord Byron's, even though they provided "no threat to the reputation" of W. B. Yeats. Retrospectively, many critics have noted the similarity between "Blackness of the Night" and Stevens' later, more folk-oriented music with topical lyrics. According to musicologist Andy Neill, the lyrics acted as an "early clue" to his later career. AllMusic critic Matt Fink considered the song to be reminiscent of Gordon Lightfoot, stating that it and the 1969 single "Where Are You" wouldn't sound out of place on Stevens' third studio album Mona Bone Jakon (1970).

Stevens has held "Blackness in the Night" in high regard, retrospectively calling it one of his "favorite tracks from that time". In 2025, he reflected that the song was a lyrical attempt to present himself as a more mature artist. in 2017, "Blackness of the Night", together with the New Masters tracks ""I'm So Sleepy" "Northern Wind", "The Laughing Apple" were re-recorded by Stevens' for the album's 50th anniversary together with producer Paul Samwell-Smith. Stevens' presented the re-recorded of "Blackness of the Night" on 4 August 2017, and the four tracks were included on his studio album The Laughing Apple on 15 September 2017.

== Sources ==
- Brown, George (2006). The Complete Illustrated Biography & Discography. United Kingdom: Brown. OCLC 77117322.
- Charlesworth, Chris (1984). Cat Stevens: The Definitive Career Biography. United Kingdom: Proteus. ISBN 978-086-27-618-13. OCLC 471584405.
- DeYoung, Bill; Stevens, Cat (2001). Cat Stevens (Box Set). US: A&M. 981 082-1 – via MusicBrainz.
- Farncombe, Tom (2012). The Little Black Songbook: Cat Stevens. United Kingdom: Wise Publications. ISBN 978-085-71294-82.
- Neill, Andy (2003). New Masters (CD). Europe: Deram. 981 082-2.
- Stevens, Cat / Yusuf (2025). Cat On The Road To Findout: The Official Autobiography. United Kingdom: Constable. ISBN 978-1-40872-080-6. OCLC 1541792701.
- Tracy, John (1989). New Masters (CD). United States: Deram. 820 767-2.
