= Very Young and Early Songs =

1971 Cat Stevens compilation album

Compilation album by Cat Stevens
- Released: 1 November 1971
- Recorded: January 1967-September 1969
- Genres: Folk pop, baroque pop
- Length: 28:48
- Label: Deram
- Producer: Mike Hurst

Cat Stevens chronology
Teaser and the Firecat (1971)	Very Young and Early Songs (1971)	Catch Bull at Four (1972)

Very Young and Early Songs is a compilation album by British singer-songwriter Cat Stevens. It was released on 1 November 1971 by Deram Records. It collects material from Stevens's early Deram era, and was the first official US release for the singles "A Bad Night", "Lovely City", "Here Comes My Wife", and "Where Are You", as well as their B-sides. After Stevens's international success in the 1970s, Deram repackaged several of his older music into multiple compilations, such as this one.

== Background ==
The compilation's content stems from Stevens's initial period of fame as a teenage pop star in the United Kingdom. Under the guidance of producer Mike Hurst, he recorded several catchy and heavily orchestrated tracks which scored UK chart hits. Also a songwriter, he sold multiple songs to other artists, such as "The First Cut is the Deepest" to P.P Arnold. Around this time, he was making a reported amount of £1000 a week.

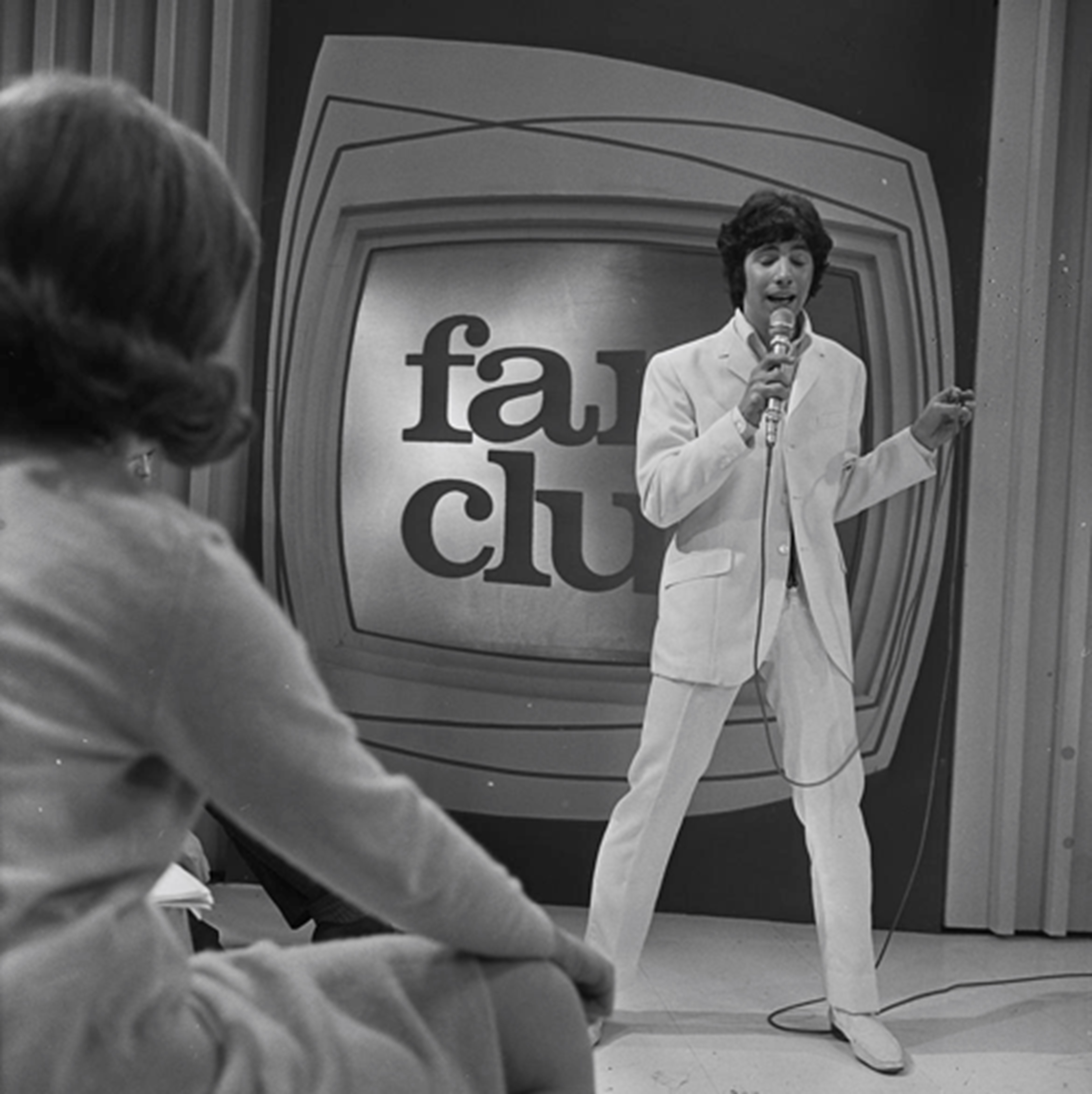
Cat Stevens in 1966 on Dutch TV program "FanClub".

But unbeknownst to Stevens, his career was about to nosedive. "I felt lonely out there and I began to drink and smoke heavily," reflected Stevens later on. Stevens’ and Hurst’s relationship, which was already deteriorating, finally broke when an agent Hurst had appointed tried to book Stevens onto a pantomime over Christmas. After Stevens’ refusal, the agent told him he was making a huge mistake. New Masters, Stevens’ second album, was recorded with lawyers present in the studio. Deram hardly promoted the album, and it ended up not charting. The next single, “Lovely City”, also didn’t reach the top 50.

On 2 March 1968, Stevens was rushed into a hospital after being diagnosed with tuberculosis. The diagnosis was hushed up, even Hurst hadn’t been told until later. After recovering, a new single, “Here Comes My Wife” was released in September, supposedly coming with another album, which never came to fruition. The last single Cat Stevens recorded for Deram, “Where Are You”, with the B-side “The View from the Top”, was recorded and released in mid-1969, featuring Stevens reunited with producer Hurst once more. It flopped, but by 1970 Stevens had a brand new contract with Island, and he would release Mona Bone Jakon and Tea for the Tillerman, albums that would elevate him to global stardom.

== Track listing ==
All tracks written by Cat Stevens. Track lengths adapted from the 1988 re-issue of Matthew & Son and the 1989 re-issue of New Masters.

Side one

1. "Here Comes My Wife" – 2:56
2. "Lovely City (When Do You Laugh?)" – 2:36
3. "The Tramp" – 2:06
4. "Come On and Dance" – 2:07
5. "Image of Hell" – 3:03

Side two

1. "Where Are You" – 2:56
2. "It's a Super (Dupa) Life" (Note: The song is titled "It's a Super (Dupa) Life". On the original album, it's listed as "It's a Super Duper Life".) – 2:46
3. "A Bad Night" – 3:07
4. "Come on Baby (Shift That Log)" – 3:42
5. "The View From the Top" – 3:29

== Charts ==
Weekly chart performance for Very Young and Early Songs
Chart (1971–1972)	Peak position
US Billboard Top LP's	94
US Cash Box Top 100 Albums	86
US Record World Albums Chart	83

== Sources ==
- Anon. (1971). Very Young and Early Songs (Vinyl). United States: Deram. DES 18061.
- Neill, Andy (2003). Matthew & Son (CD). Europe: Deram. 981 082-1.
- Neill, Andy (2004). New Masters (CD). Europe: Deram. 981 082-2.
- Tracy, John (1988). Matthew & Son (CD). United States: Deram. 820 560–2.
- Tracy, John (1989). New Masters (CD). United States: Deram. 820 767-2.
