= Cat Stevens (box set) =

Box set by Cat Stevens
- Released: October 30, 2001
- Recorded: 1965–1978, 1997
- Genres: Soft rock, folk rock, baroque pop
- Label: A&M
- Producers: Bill Levinson and Daniel Gordon, Cat Stevens (aka Yusuf Islam)

Cat Stevens chronology
Bismillah (2001)	Cat Stevens (2001)	In Praise of the Last Prophet (2002)

Cat Stevens (also known as In Search of the Centre of the Universe and On the Road to Find Out) is a four-disc box set by British singer-songwriter Cat Stevens/Yusuf Islam. Released on October 30, 2001, it features 79 tracks—hits, B-sides, live tracks and previously unreleased material from his tenures on Deram and Island/A&M Records—spanning his career from 1965 to 1978, plus one track from 1997 recorded as 'Yusuf'.

The box set came in the wake of renewed interest in Yusuf's work, following a highly-rated exposé on VH1's Behind The Music and remastered CD reissues of his back catalog the year before. Yusuf was heavily involved in the production of the box set, writing a new essay on his early life and spiritual journey for the included booklet. The booklet also contains a timeline of Yusuf's career, and track-by-track commentary by Yusuf, Mike Hurst, Paul Samwell-Smith and Alun Davies.

The box set was re-released in 2008 with smaller packaging.

== Release and reception ==
In response to the 9/11 terrorist attacks that occurred one month before the box set's release, Yusuf announced on September 28 that he would donate a portion of his royalties to the September 11th Fund, with the rest going to homeless families and underdeveloped countries.

Professional ratings
Review scores
Source	Rating
AllMusic	4.5/5 stars
The Guardian	4/5 stars
The New Rolling Stone Album Guide	4/5 stars
Miami Herald	2/5 stars
Los Angeles Times	2/4 stars
The Atlanta Journal-Constitution	A

Entertainment Weekly's David Browne and Los Angeles Times' Robert Hilburn both thought the box set was inferior to The Very Best of Cat Stevens. The Guardian's John Aizlewood notes: "The forgotten artist is often worth reintroducing. [...] His eponymous four-CD box set chronicles a lavishly gifted, if wet, talent." Miami Herald's Howard Cohen thought there were far too many tracks in the box set, and wrote that the new songs "fail to advance one's appreciation of the artist". Goldmine's Dave Thompson noted the "seamless" song transitions and concluded that "the box is unquestionably a magnificent edifice", with the additional notes from Stevens providing an "irresistible glimpse" into the making of his records. The Atlanta Journal-Constitution's Shane Harrison gave the box set an "A" grade, noting that it had plenty to offer for hardcore fans, but may be too overwhelming for casual fans.

A contemporary review by The New Rolling Stone Album Guide states that it "offers just about all the Cat Stevens anyone should ever need, including a handful of rarities." AllMusic's Lindsay Planer also praised the improved quality of earlier Deram tracks.

== Track listing ==
All songs written by Yusuf/Cat Stevens, except where noted. * indicates previously unreleased track.

=== Disc 1 (The City) ===
1. "Back to the Good Old Times" (1965 demo)*
2. "I Love My Dog"
3. "Portobello Road"
4. "Here Comes My Baby"
5. "Matthew and Son"
6. "The Tramp"
7. "I'm Gonna Get Me a Gun"
8. "School Is Out"
9. "A Bad Night"
10. "The Laughing Apple"
11. "Kitty"
12. "Blackness of Night"
13. "The First Cut is the Deepest"
14. "Northern Wind"
15. "Moonstone"
16. "Come On Baby (Shift That Log)"
17. "Lovely City (When Do You Laugh?)"
18. "Here Comes My Wife"
19. "The View From the Top"
20. "Where Are You"
21. "If Only Mother Could See Me Now" (demo)*
22. "Honey Man" (with Elton John)* (Cat Stevens and Ken Cumberbatch)
23. "The Joke"*

=== Disc 2 (The Search) ===
1. "Time/Fill My Eyes" (demo versions)*
2. "Lady D'Arbanville"
3. "Trouble"
4. "Pop Star"
5. "Katmandu"
6. "Lilywhite"
7. "I've Got a Thing About Seeing My Grandson Grow Old" (Alternate mix)*
8. "Where Do the Children Play?"
9. "Wild World"
10. "Sad Lisa"
11. "On The Road to Find Out"
12. "Father and Son"
13. "Love Lives In The Sky"*
14. "Don't Be Shy"
15. "If You Want To Sing Out, Sing Out"
16. "The Day They Make Me Tsar" (Demo version)*
17. "The Wind"
18. "Moonshadow"
19. "Morning Has Broken" (Eleanor Farjeon)
20. "How Can I Tell You"
21. "Peace Train"
22. "I Want To Live In A Wigwam"

=== Disc 3 (The Hurt) ===
1. "Crab Dance"
2. "Sitting"
3. "Silent Starlight"
4. "Angelsea"
5. "Can't Keep It In"
6. "18th Avenue (Kansas City Nightmare)"
7. "The Hurt"
8. "Foreigner Suite"
9. "Oh Very Young"
10. "Music"
11. "Sun/C79"
12. "King of Trees"
13. "Bad Penny" (live)
14. "Lady D'Arbanville" (live)
15. "Another Saturday Night" (Sam Cooke)

=== Disc 4 (The Last) ===
1. "Whistlestar"
2. "Novin's Nightmare"
3. "Majik of Majiks"
4. "Banapple Gas"
5. "Blue Monday"* (Dave Bartholomew)
6. "Doves (Majikat Earth Tour Theme Song)"
7. "Hard Headed Woman" (live)*
8. "Tuesday's Dead" (live)*
9. "Ruins" (live)*
10. "(Remember The Days Of The) Old Schoolyard"
11. "Life"
12. "(I Never Wanted) To Be a Star"
13. "Child For A Day" (David Gordon and Paul Travis)
14. "Just Another Night"
15. "Daytime" (Cat Stevens and Alun Davies)
16. "Last Love Song"
17. "Never"
18. "Father and Son" (Live)*
19. "God Is The Light" (with Raihan)
