= Gold (Cat Stevens album) =

Compilation album by Cat Stevens
- Released: 15 November 2005
- Recorded: 1966–2005
- Genres: Soft rock, folk rock, baroque pop
- Length: 2:05:20
- Labels: Island (UK/Europe); A&M (US/Canada)
- Producers: Cat Stevens (aka Yusuf Islam), Mike Hurst, Paul Samwell-Smith, David Kershenbaum, Martin Terefe

Cat Stevens chronology
Night of Remembrance (2004)	Gold (2005)	An Other Cup (2006)

Gold is a two-CD compilation of classic singles and album tracks by British singer-songwriter, Cat Stevens, now known as Yusuf Islam. It is part of Universal Music's series of double-disc anthologies derived from their extensive back catalog. The track list starts with Stevens' early British hit "Matthew & Son" and ends with a new recording by Islam, "Indian Ocean", recorded and first released as a digital download on the iTunes Music Store to benefit 2004 Asian tsunami relief efforts.

One review of the compilation suggests that the anthology "manages to cram into two discs what 2001's On the Road to Find Out box set tried to accomplish over four." Like the box set five years earlier, Islam actively participated in the compilation of the anthology. Given both the extensive track listing and the presence of a new Stevens recording (the first on which he has played guitar since he stopped recording under his stage name), this compilation apparently makes previous non-box set compilations of Stevens' work redundant and incomplete.

Professional ratings
Review scores
Source	Rating
AllMusic	4.5/5 stars

== Track listing ==
All songs written by Cat Stevens except where noted. "Indian Ocean" is credited under Stevens' current legal name, Yusuf Islam.

=== Disc one ===
No.	Title	Original album	Length
1.	"Matthew & Son"	Matthew & Son (1967)	2:46
2.	"Here Comes My Baby"	Matthew & Son (1967)	2:55
3.	"The First Cut Is the Deepest"	New Masters (1967)	3:02
4.	"Lady D'Arbanville"	Mona Bone Jakon (1970)	3:43
5.	"Trouble"	Mona Bone Jakon (1970)	2:47
6.	"Where Do the Children Play?"	Tea for the Tillerman (1970)	3:53
7.	"Hard Headed Woman"	Tea for the Tillerman (1970)	3:49
8.	"Wild World"	Tea for the Tillerman (1970)	3:20
9.	"Sad Lisa"	Tea for the Tillerman (1970)	3:43
10.	"Father and Son"	Tea for the Tillerman (1970)	3:41
11.	"Don't Be Shy"	Harold and Maude (1971)	2:52
12.	"If You Want to Sing Out, Sing Out"	Harold and Maude (1971)	2:46
13.	"The Wind"	Teaser and the Firecat (1971)	1:42
14.	"Moonshadow"	Teaser and the Firecat (1971)	2:50
15.	"Morning Has Broken" (Lyrics: Eleanor Farjeon/ Music: trad. arr. Stevens)	Teaser and the Firecat (1971)	3:19
16.	"Bitterblue"	Teaser and the Firecat (1971)	3:12
17.	"Peace Train"	Teaser and the Firecat (1971)	4:11

=== Disc two ===
No.	Title	Original album	Length
1.	"Sitting"	Catch Bull at Four (1972)	3:13
2.	"Silent Sunlight"	Catch Bull at Four (1972)	3:02
3.	"Angelsea"	Catch Bull at Four (1972)	4:29
4.	"Can't Keep It In"	Catch Bull at Four (1972)	3:00
5.	"18th Avenue (Kansas City Nightmare)"	Catch Bull at Four (1972)	4:19
6.	"The Hurt"	Foreigner (1973)	4:19
7.	"Foreigner Suite"	Foreigner (1973)	18:17
8.	"Oh Very Young"	Buddha and the Chocolate Box (1974)	2:37
9.	"King of Trees"	Buddha and the Chocolate Box (1974)	5:08
10.	"Another Saturday Night" (Sam Cooke)	Non-album single (1974)	2:31
11.	"Drywood"	Numbers (1975)	4:56
12.	"(Remember the Days of the) Old Schoolyard"	Izitso (1977)	2:45
13.	"(I Never Wanted) To Be a Star"	Izitso (1977)	3:02
14.	"Last Love Song"	Back to Earth (1978)	3:25
15.	"Indian Ocean"	New recording	6:00

== Charts ==
Chart performance for Gold
Chart (2026)	Peak position
Greek Albums (IFPI)	38
