= Tell 'Em I'm Gone =

Studio album by Yusuf
- Released: 27 October 2014
- Recorded: 2013–2014
- Genres: R&B, folk rock
- Length: 35:57
- Labels: Cat-O-Log, Legacy
- Producers: Rick Rubin & Yusuf

Yusuf chronology
Roadsinger (2009)	Tell 'Em I'm Gone (2014)	The Laughing Apple (2017)

Tell 'Em I'm Gone is the fourteenth studio album by Yusuf (formerly known as Cat Stevens). The album was released on 27 October 2014 on his new Cat-O-Log record label, through Sony's Legacy Recordings. It is Yusuf's third mainstream release since his return to music and his first in five years since 2009's acclaimed Roadsinger. The album was produced by Rick Rubin and Yusuf, and features Richard Thompson.

Professional ratings
Aggregate scores
Source	Rating
Metacritic	70/100
Review scores
Source	Rating
Chicago Tribune	3/4 stars
AllMusic	3/5 stars
The Daily Telegraph	3/5 stars
The Observer	3/5 stars
Rolling Stone	3/5 stars
Consequence of Sound	(C+)

== Background ==
On 15 September 2014, Yusuf announced the forthcoming release on 27 October 2014 of his new studio album Tell 'Em I'm Gone and two tours: a November 2014 (9-date) Europe tour and a December 2014 (6-date) North America tour, the latter being his first since 1976.

The 5th track, "Editing Floor Blues", references the 1989 controversy in which Yusuf was embroiled after making comments on the Salman Rushdie fatwa. The specific line reads: "One day the papers rang us up, 'T’check if I said this?', I said 'Oh boy! I'd never say that!' And we got down to the truth of it, but they never printed that!"

== Cover art ==
On the album cover, the singer is credited as "Yusuf" with a promotional sticker identifying him also as "Cat Stevens". Vinyl and digital editions have a different cover, drawn by William Stout.

== Personnel ==
Personnel on the album include Richard Thompson, Charlie Musselwhite, Bonnie "Prince" Billy, Tinariwen, and Matt Sweeney.

== Promotional tours ==
On 15 September 2014, Yusuf announced two short tours following the release of the album: a November 2014 (9-date) Europe tour and a December 2014 (6-date) North America tour, the latter being his first one there since 1976.

== Track listing ==
All songs are written by Yusuf except as indicated.

No.	Title	Length
1.	"I Was Raised in Babylon"	3:53
2.	"Big Boss Man" (Luther Dixon, Al Smith)	3:10
3.	"Dying to Live" (Edgar Winter)	3:47
4.	"You Are My Sunshine" (Jimmie Davis, Charles Mitchell, arranged by Yusuf)	3:13
5.	"Editing Floor Blues"	3:42
6.	"Cat and the Dog Trap"	3:22
7.	"Gold Digger"	4:34
8.	"The Devil Came from Kansas" (Gary Brooker, Keith Reid)	3:42
9.	"Tell 'Em I'm Gone" (originally "Take This Hammer", arranged by Yusuf)	3:12
10.	"Doors"	3:22

== Charts ==
Chart (2014)	Peak position
Australian Albums (ARIA)	24
Austrian Albums (Ö3 Austria)	15
Belgian Albums (Ultratop Flanders)	94
Belgian Albums (Ultratop Wallonia)	69
French Albums (SNEP)	90
German Albums (Offizielle Top 100)	26
Italian Albums (FIMI)	30
Swiss Albums (Schweizer Hitparade)	39
UK Albums (Official Charts)	22
US Billboard 200	24
US Americana/Folk Albums (Billboard)	2
US Top Rock Albums (Billboard)	6
