= Kitty (Cat Stevens song) =

1967 single written and recorded by Cat Stevens

- Dutch picture sleeve

Single by Cat Stevens

from the album New Masters
- B-side: "Blackness of the Night"
- Released: 1 December 1967
- Recorded: November 1967
- Studio: Decca, London
- Genre: Folk pop; orchestral pop
- Length: 2:17
- Label: Deram
- Songwriter: Cat Stevens
- Producer: Mike Hurst

Cat Stevens singles chronology
"A Bad Night" (1967)	"Kitty" (1967)	"Lovely City (When Do You Laugh?)" (1968)

Audio
- "Kitty" on YouTube

"Kitty" is a song written and recorded by the English singer-songwriter Cat Stevens in 1967. His previous single "A Bad Night" had reached number 20 on the Record Retailer chart in England, which was a decline in his popularity. "Kitty" was written during his hectic touring schedule whilst smoking cannabis, and is an folk pop featuring orchestral pop undertones and a large arrangement. Lyrically, it is about a female prisoner. "Kitty" was recorded at Decca Studios in November 1967 and producer by Mike Hurst.

Deram Records released "Kitty" as Stevens fifth single on 1 December 1967 with "Blackness of the Night" on the B-side. On 15 December, it was included as the opening track of his second studio album New Masters. Despite promoting it on various light entertainment shows, "Kitty" only reached number 47 on the Record Retailer chart. Contemporary reviews of the singles were positive, with critics noting the production, arrangement and maturity of Stevens performance. Retrospectively, it has been noted as "overproduced" and put Stevens' onto an unfavorable musical path. It was Stevens' final charting single in the UK until "Lady D'Arbanville" (1970)

== Composition and recording ==
The one track on the New Masters that harked back to the early days. It had a big arrangement, written by Phil Dennys, and some of the old excitement.

— Mike Hurst about "Kitty" (2001)

In July 1967, Cat Stevens released "A Bad Night", his fourth single release. The single peaked at number 20 on the Record Retailer chart, which was had a part in the "first phase of his career nosediving" since it didn't share the success of his top-ten hits "Matthew and Son" (1966) and "I'm Gonna Get Me a Gun" (1967). Additionally, the constant touring, alongside a legal feud with his producer Mike Hurst had started taking a toll on Stevens, who had started to cope by drinking alcohol, smoking and occasionally trying cannabis, which he did when he wrote "Kitty", with Record Collector calling the song "dope-induced". Reflecting on the song, Stevens characterized it to be simpler than "A Bad Night" and squarely aimed at the pop market.

With a runtime of 2:17, writer Ken Barnes of Phonograph Record classes "Kitty" as an "orchestrated pop ditty", and Stevens' biographer Chris Charlesworth categorizes "Kitty" as having orchestral pop undertones, "with bombastic brass crowding the chorus". Similarly, journalist Andy Neill states that the song was "furnished with another busy arrangement". However, Bruce Eder identifies the track as having a "quirky folk-pop sound". Lyrically, Neill compares the theme of "Kitty" to that of the Zombies contemporary single "Care of Cell 44" (1967), as they both revolve around a female prisoner, and also refers to the narrator "working day and night" until she gets released. "Kitty" was recorded at Decca Studios in West Hampstead, London during November 1967 with an arrangement written by Phil Dennys, who also acted as the song's music director. As with the rest of New Masters, Hurst produced the song.

== Release and reception ==
"Kitty" was initially released as Cat Stevens' fifth single through Deram Records on 1 December 1967 as a "taster of things to come" with another Stevens composition, "Blackness of the Night" on the B-side. (Note: Catalogue number Deram DM 156.) This was followed by its inclusion on his second studio album New Masters on 15 December 1967, (Note: Mono catalogue number DML 1018, stereo catalogue number SML 1018.) where it was sequenced as the opening track preceding "I'm So Sleepy". Although Stevens was called onto a variety of light entertainment television programs to promote the single, including Good Evening (9 December), Twice a Fortnight (10 December), and Crackerjack! (12 December), "Kitty" only managed to reach number 47 on the Record Retailer chart for the single week of 20 December 1967. It fared better in New Zealand, where it reached number six on the New Zealand Listener chart in February 1968, and in Canada, where it reached number 26 on the CHUM Chart in March.

Upon initial release, "Kitty" received primarily good reviews in the trade magazines. Writing for Disc and Music Echo, journalist Penny Valentine opinioned that the track bore shades of his previous singles "Matthew and Son" and "I'm Gonna Get Me a Gun", and that it "grew on her". She praised Stevens' vocal input, believing it has "improved beyond measure", but noted that his singles were his most simple and "most effective material" in contrast to the content on New Masters. Similarly, Chris Welch also compared the lyrical content to "Matthew and Son", and praised Stevens for singing "with venom and power". In a blind date for Melody Maker, Des O'Connor believed the song to have an interesting introduction and a tremendous drive, but compared it disfavorably to "Matthew and Son". The production of the song was also praised, with Derek Johnson of New Musical Express and commented that "the scoring had just as much impact as the singer". He also believed "Kitty" to be a reflection of Stevens maturation as an artist, as he performed it with "greater authority and expression" than his previous output. Peter Jones from Record Mirror also shared the opinion of "Kitty" having a good production, noting it as "exceptional" with a "fine arrangement".

However, retrospectively, Charlesworth believed "Kitty" perfectly illustrated "the dilemma that Cat was facing"; he stated the track to be overproduced "to the point of absurdity". Believing the single release put Stevens on a path "veering towards" variety entertainment, which was the direction his management had wanted him to steer. Indeed, this culminated in Stevens terminating his association with Hurst, after an agent appointed by the latter had booked Stevens onto a pantomime shortly after the release of "Kitty". This reflected a desire to turn Stevens "minor league" ballad singer that had "teenybop aspirations" as a cross between Engelbert Humperdinck and Davy Jones of the Monkees. Nonetheless, "Kitty" alongside New Masters marked a significant decline in the popularity of Stevens as a performing artist, after which he was forced into the "singles game" which he was actively starting to detest. "Kitty" was Stevens' final charting single in the UK for Deram, and his final chart entry until "Lady D'Arbanville" put him back in the top-ten in 1970.

== Charts ==
Chart performance
Chart (1967–68)	Peak position
Canada (CHUM Chart)	26
New Zealand (Listener)	6
UK (Record Retailer)	47

== Sources ==
- Brown, George (2006). The Complete Illustrated Biography & Discography. United Kingdom: Brown. OCLC 77117322.
- Charlesworth, Chris (1984). Cat Stevens: The Definitive Career Biography. United Kingdom: Proteus. ISBN 978-086-27-618-13. OCLC 471584405.
- DeYoung, Bill; Stevens, Cat (2001). Cat Stevens (Box Set). US: A&M. 981 082-1 – via MusicBrainz.
- Kent, David (2005). Australian Chart Book 1940–1969. Turramurra, NSW: Australian Chart Book. ISBN 0-646-44439-5. OCLC 62561852.
- Kimberley, C (2000). Zimbabwe: Singles Chart Book. Zimbabwe. OCLC 499262382.
- Neill, Andy (2003). New Masters (CD). Europe: Deram. 981 082-2.
- Roberts, David (2006). British Hit Singles & Albums (19th ed.). United Kingdom: Guinness World Records Limited. ISBN 1-904994-10-5. OCLC 64098209.
- Stevens, Cat / Yusuf (2025). Cat On The Road To Findout: The Official Autobiography. United Kingdom: Constable. ISBN 978-1-40872-080-6. OCLC 1541792701.
- Tracy, John (1989). New Masters (CD). United States: Deram. 820 767-2.
