= The Laughing Apple =

Studio album by Yusuf / Cat Stevens
- Released: 15 September 2017
- Recorded: ICP Studios, Belgium
- Genre: Folk
- Length: 33:26
- Labels: Cat-O-Log, Decca, Verve (US)
- Producers: Yusuf / Cat Stevens & Paul Samwell-Smith

Yusuf / Cat Stevens chronology
Tell 'Em I'm Gone (2014)	The Laughing Apple (2017)	Tea for the Tillerman 2 (2020)

Singles from The Laughing Apple
- 1. "See What Love Did to Me" Released: 21 July 2017

The Laughing Apple is the fifteenth studio album by Yusuf / Cat Stevens, released on 15 September 2017 by Cat-O-Log Records. It is Yusuf's fourth mainstream release since his return to music and his first since 2014's Tell 'Em I'm Gone. The album was produced by Yusuf / Cat Stevens & Paul Samwell-Smith. Its title is a reference to one of Cat Stevens' earlier song, "The Laughing Apple" that was included as the B-side of his 1967 single "A Bad Night" and later on his second album New Masters. It would be the first album with his former name (Cat Stevens) included on an album since his Back to Earth album, released in 1978. It was nominated for the Grammy Award for Best Folk Album.

== Background ==
On 21 July 2017, Yusuf / Cat Stevens announced the forthcoming release on 15 September 2017 of his new studio album The Laughing Apple.

== Track listing ==
No.	Title	Length
1.	"Blackness of the Night" (Previously released on "New Masters", 1967)	3:02
2.	"See What Love Did to Me"	3:44
3.	"The Laughing Apple" (Previously released on "New Masters", 1967)	3:04
4.	"Olive Hill"	2:46
5.	"Grandsons" (Previously released on "The Very Best of Cat Stevens", 2000, with new lyrics)	3:03
6.	"Mighty Peace"	2:20
7.	"Mary and the Little Lamb"	3:35
8.	"You Can Do (Whatever)"	3:10
9.	"Northern Wind (Death of Billy the Kid)" (Previously released on "New Masters", 1967)	2:41
10.	"Don’t Blame Them"	3:38
11.	"I'm So Sleepy" (Previously released on "New Masters", 1967)	2:23

== Charts ==
Chart (2017)	Peak position
Australian Albums (ARIA)	59
Austrian Albums (Ö3 Austria)	26
Belgian Albums (Ultratop Flanders)	65
Belgian Albums (Ultratop Wallonia)	98
French Albums (SNEP)	74
German Albums (Offizielle Top 100)	4
Italian Albums (FIMI)	90
New Zealand Albums (RMNZ)	32
Scottish Albums (Official Charts)	18
Spanish Albums (PROMUSICAE)	79
Swiss Albums (Schweizer Hitparade)	33
UK Albums (Official Charts)	23
US Billboard 200	114
