= Prayers of the Last Prophet =

Studio album by Yusuf Islam
- Released: 14 September 1999
- Genre: Spoken word
- Label: Jamal
- Producer: Yusuf Islam

Yusuf Islam chronology
The Life of the Last Prophet (1995)	Prayers of the Last Prophet (1999)	I Have No Cannons That Roar (2000)

Prayers Of The Last Prophet is an album by Yusuf Islam. The album is the follow-up to The Life of the Last Prophet, and contains a collection of du’as (supplications) as used by the Islamic prophet, Muhammad.

== Track listing ==
1. Prayers: Introduction
2. Prayers: O Am Indeed Close
3. Prayers: O Son of Adam
4. Prayers: Praise Be to Allah
5. Prayers: Be Mindful of Allah
6. Prayers: Rabbi Ya Rahmnan
7. Prayers: Chief of Prayers
8. Night: Bedtime Prayer
9. Night: They Forsake Their Beds
10. Night: Night Prayer
11. Dawn: Call to Prayer
12. Dawn: Light
13. Dawn: The Morning Prayer
14. Dawn: If You Ask Me
15. Dawn: Let Not Our Hearts Deviate
16. Day: Istikharah
17. Day: Sovereignty
18. Day: Leaving Home
19. Day: Travel Prayers
20. Day: Visiting the Sick
21. Day: Seventy Thousand Angels
22. Day: Entering the Mosque
23. Day: Truly My Prayer
24. Day: Water, Ice and Snow
25. Day: Prostration
26. Day: Al-Tashahhud
27. Day: O Allah, Help Me
28. Day: Leaving the Mosque
29. Day: Rivalry in Worldly Increase
30. Day: Visiting the Graves
31. Evening: Entering the Home
32. Evening: Grant Us Wives and Offspring
33. Evening: Prayer for Children
34. Evening: Prayer for Parents
35. Evening: In Sa' Altu
36. Evening: Prayers for Eating
37. Evening: O My Servants
38. Evening: Prayers on the Prophet
39. Evening: Blessing on Muhammad
40. Evening: Salli 'Ala Muhammad
