= The Life of the Last Prophet =

Studio album by Yusuf Islam
- Released: 1 April 1995
- Genre: Spoken word
- Label: Mountain of Light/Jamal

Yusuf Islam chronology
The Very Best of Cat Stevens (1990)	The Life of the Last Prophet (1995)	Prayers of the Last Prophet (1999)

The Life of the Last Prophet is the first album released by Yusuf Islam (after leaving the Western pop music business in 1978, when he was known as Cat Stevens). After that time, he recorded only albums with Islamic themes, including recordings for children to learn both the Arabic alphabet and basic tenets of Islam. This album is both an attempt to give praise to Muhammad, which is encouraged as an act of faith in the Qur'an, and an attempt to reach out to young people and those who wish to understand more about Islam, and to explain why such a popular commercial recording artist would leave the business at the height of his career.

Released in 1995, the album is a spoken-word, audio production.

== Track listing ==
1. Call to Prayer [Adhan]
2. Introduction
3. The Lone Orphan
4. The Trustworthy
5. The Black Stone
6. Polytheists and Idols
7. The Cave
8. Read! [Surah Al'alaq]
9. The Opening [Surah Al-Fatihah]
10. Allah; the One [Surah Al-Ikhlas]
11. Rejection and Boycott
12. The Night Journey
13. The Lote Tree [Surah Al-Isra']
14. Five Daily Prayers
15. Al-Madinah
16. The First Constitution
17. Migrants and Helpers [Surah Al-Anfal]
18. Charity and Fasting
19. People of the Book
20. Permission to Fight [Surah Al-Hajj]
21. Battle of Badr
22. Truce of Hudaybiyyah
23. Call to the Rulers
24. Common Terms [Surah Al 'Imran]
25. Makkah Opened
26. Ilaha Illa Allah
27. Idols Smashed
28. Religion of Truth [Surah Al-Saf]
29. Farewell Pilgrimage
30. This Day [Surah Al-Mustafa]
31. The Death of the Prophet
32. Muhammad Al Mustafa
33. Supplication [Du'd]
34. Tala'a Al-Badru 'Alayna
