= The Very Best of Cat Stevens =

1990 compilation album by Cat Stevens

Greatest hits album by Cat Stevens
- Released: 22 January 1990
- Genre: Folk rock
- Length: 57:32 (1990)
- Label: PolyGram

Cat Stevens chronology
The Best of Cat Stevens (1989)	The Very Best of Cat Stevens (1990)	The Life of the Last Prophet (1995)

The Very Best of Cat Stevens

Greatest hits album by Cat Stevens
- Released: 2000; 2003
- Genre: Folk rock
- Length: 1:08:52 (2000); 1:17:45 (2003)
- Labels: A&M (2000); Universal (2003)

Cat Stevens chronology
Remember Cat Stevens – The Ultimate Collection (1999)	The Very Best of Cat Stevens (2000)	Cat Stevens (2001)

The Very Best of Cat Stevens is the title of a compilation album by Cat Stevens. There are multiple albums released with this title. The first was released by Polygram on its recently acquired Island Records label in January 1990. Its cover picture appears to be a reference to the Teaser and the Firecat album cover; both feature a boy in a top hat, "Teaser", accompanied by an orange cat, "Firecat", beside a fence with a full moon overhead.

A compilation album with the same title was released in 2000 on the A&M and UTV Records labels. In many respects, it is a substantially different album. The track list is substantially different (though most of the same tracks are present). The cover art for these releases features a simple portrait of the artist. This album was released in the UK and Europe in 2003, using the same cover art but with a different track list. The UTV Records release was also available with a DVD bonus disk containing some early footage.

Professional ratings
Review scores
Source	Rating
Allmusic (2000)	4/5 stars

== Track listing ==
All songs written by Cat Stevens, except where noted.

=== 1990 edition ===
1. "Where Do the Children Play?" (1970) - 3:50
2. "Wild World" (1970) - 3:18
3. "Tuesday's Dead" (1971) - 3:35
4. "Lady D'Arbanville" (1970) - 3:40
5. "The First Cut Is the Deepest" (1967) - 3:30
6. "Oh Very Young" (1974) - 2:30
7. "Rubylove" (1971) - 2:35
8. "Morning Has Broken" (Eleanor Farjeon) (1971) - 3:16
9. "Moonshadow" (1971) - 2:48
10. "Matthew & Son" (1966) - 2:40
11. "Father and Son" (1970) - 2:37
12. "Can't Keep It In" (1972) - 2:58
13. "Hard Headed Woman" (1970) - 3:46
14. "(Remember the Days of the) Old Schoolyard" (with Elkie Brooks) (1977) - 2:44
15. "I Love My Dog" (1966) - 2:18
16. "Another Saturday Night" (Sam Cooke) (1974) - 2:27
17. "Sad Lisa" (1970) - 3:40
18. "Peace Train" (1971) - 4:04

=== 2000 edition ===
1. "Matthew & Son"
2. "The First Cut Is the Deepest"
3. "Lady D'Arbanville"
4. "I've Got a Thing About Seeing My Grandson Grow Old" (Previously unreleased)
5. "Wild World"
6. "Where Do the Children Play?"
7. "Hard Headed Woman"
8. "Father and Son"
9. "The Wind"
10. "Morning Has Broken"
11. "Moonshadow"
12. "Peace Train"
13. "Sitting"
14. "Can't Keep It In"
15. "Foreigner Suite" (Excerpt)
16. "Oh Very Young"
17. "Another Saturday Night"
18. "Majik of Majiks"
19. "(Remember the Days of the) Old Schoolyard"
20. "Just Another Night"

=== 2003 UK edition ===
1. "Moonshadow" – 2:50
2. "Father and Son" – 3:41
3. "Morning Has Broken" (Eleanor Farjeon) – 3:20
4. "Wild World" – 3:21
5. "The First Cut Is the Deepest" – 3:01
6. "Lady D'Arbanville" – 3:45
7. "Oh Very Young" – 2:36
8. "Matthew & Son" – 2:44
9. "Sitting" – 3:14
10. "Hard Headed Woman" – 3:49
11. "I Love My Dog" – 2:19
12. "Ruby Love" – 2:38
13. "Don't Be Shy" – 2:51
14. "Can't Keep It In" – 3:00
15. "Here Comes My Baby" – 2:55
16. "Into White" – 3:25
17. "(Remember the Days of The) Old Schoolyard" – 2:43
18. "Where Do the Children Play?" – 3:52
19. "How Can I Tell You" – 4:28
20. "Another Saturday Night" (Sam Cooke) – 2:28
21. "Sad Lisa" – 3:42
22. "Just Another Night" – 3:51
23. "Peace Train" – 4:12
24. "If You Want to Sing Out, Sing Out" – 2:46

=== 2003 UK edition bonus DVD ===
1. "Moonshadow"
2. "Wild World"
3. "Father and Son"
4. "Hard Headed Woman (live)"
5. "Where Do the Children Play?"
6. "(Remember the Days of The) Old Schoolyard"
7. "Teaser and the Firecat"

== Charts ==
2004 Weekly chart performance for The Very Best of Cat Stevens
Chart (2004)	Peak position
South African Albums (RISA)	1

2024 Weekly chart performance for The Very Best of Cat Stevens
Chart (2024)	Peak position
Greek Albums (IFPI)	10

== Certifications ==
Region	Certification	Certified units/sales
Australia (ARIA)	3× Platinum	210,000^{^}
Canada (Music Canada)	Gold	50,000^{^}
France (SNEP)	Platinum	300,000^{*}
Germany (BVMI)	Gold	250,000^{^}
Mexico (AMPROFON)	Gold	100,000^{^}
New Zealand (RMNZ)	2× Platinum	30,000^{‡}
United Kingdom (BPI)	3× Platinum	900,000^{‡}
^{*} Sales figures based on certification alone.^{^} Shipments figures based on certification alone.^{‡} Sales+streaming figures based on certification alone.
