= New Masters =

Studio album by Cat Stevens
- Released: 15 December 1967
- Recorded: 3 July – 3 November 1967
- Studios: Decca and Olympic, London
- Genres: Baroque pop; folk pop
- Length: 30:55
- Label: Deram
- Producer: Mike Hurst

Cat Stevens chronology
Matthew and Son (1967)	New Masters (1967)	Mona Bone Jakon (1970)

Singles from New Masters
- 1. "Kitty" Released: 1 December 1967

New Masters is the second studio album by British singer-songwriter Cat Stevens, released on 15 December 1967 by Deram Records. Stevens established himself as a successful pop star by the summer of 1967, with top-ten singles such as "Matthew and Son" (1966) and his debut album Matthew & Son (1967). Stevens wanted to branch out from the musical style that made him successful, disappointing Deram and producer Mike Hurst; Hurst got into a legal feud with Stevens. New Masters was recorded amidst legal trouble primarily between October and November 1967 with a session spanning back to July. Most of the album was recorded at Decca Studios, although several songs were recorded at Olympic Studios. The sessions also produced the non-album single "A Bad Night" (1967).

Conceived as a "darker" than its predecessor, New Masters was intended as more self-conscious and serious than Matthew & Son. It contains many different genres, primarily his previously established folk-pop and baroque pop style but also songs inspired by the Wild West, songs written with influences from the British Museum and re-writes of Stevens's previous hit singles and protest songs. All of the album's tracks were written by Stevens, including his rendition of "The First Cut Is the Deepest" (originally recorded by P. P. Arnold).

Preceded by the single release of "Kitty", Deram released New Masters on 15 December 1967 in the United Kingdom and in January 1968 in the United States. Decca Records was unwilling to promote the album due to the legal troubles between Hurst and Stevens', causing failure to chart upon initial release in both territories. Deram re-released New Masters in 1971 after which it reached number 173 on the Billboard 200 in the United States, and the album has since been re-issued on both CD and vinyl. Upon original release, New Masters received primarily positive reviews, with a focus on the strength of Stevens' songwriting. Retrospective assessment has been mixed, with critics finding it overproduced. Stevens parted ways with Hurst shortly after the album's release, and it was also his final album for Deram.

== Background ==
By the summer of 1967, Cat Stevens had achieved immense commercial success in the United Kingdom. His singles "Matthew and Son" (1966) and "I'm Gonna Get Me a Gun" (1967) had both reached the Record Retailer top-ten, as had his debut album Matthew & Son (1967). According to writer John Tracy, Stevens' had "arrived in triumphant style" by the span of less than 8 months. In addition to having become a teenage idol, he had also established himself as a respected songwriter when the Tremeloes rendition of "Here Comes My Baby" (1967) also became a worldwide hit, which additionally had made him wealthy in the form of royalties. Although he made upwards of £1,000 a week solely by performing, his career was "about to take a nosedive". Stevens' had started experiencing the downsides of stardom and began drinking and smoking heavily to cope with his loneliness; in a later interview, Stevens stated that he "needed at least a bottle of brandy or wine" to get him onto stage. (Note: The Jimi Hendrix Experience's bassist Noel Redding introduced Stevens' to LSD as well, though he did not have a pleasant experience with the drug which spared him "from hurtling down the route of drugs".)

At the time, Stevens was signed to Deram Records and was produced by former Springfields-member Mike Hurst. At the time, Stevens' sound was largely influenced by the Beach Boys' Pet Sounds (1966), an album that Hurst had a "permanent infatuation with". However, Stevens' had started being torn between being viewed as an "expandable pop idol" and the continued development of his music, particularly after the Beatles' released Sgt. Pepper's Lonely Hearts Club Band during the summer of 1967. Stevens' had ambitions of being a "proper singer-songwriter", which made him stand at odds with Hurst, who wanted to continue to do "the bigger arrangements" and refused to let him part from this sound. Stevens' had also grown tired with Deram Records, who also refused to let him branch out from his baroque pop-sound in fear that the endeavour would not be commercially successful. The entire endeavour led to Stevens, his brother David and Hurst meeting behind closed doors, where Hurst was accused of profiting "unduly" from Stevens' music, which he vehemently denied. This in turn led to a long, complicated legal fight between Stevens and Hurst; their next appointment was with a lawyer.

== Recording ==
Cat Stevens and producer Mike Hurst finally convened together at Olympic Studios in Barnes, London on 3 July 1967 together with music director Arthur Greenslade. This was Stevens' first studio session in almost half a year, following his 1 February recording of "Here Comes My Baby", which had appeared on Matthew & Son. Stevens' recorded two songs that would appear on New Masters at Olympic; "Moonstone and "The Laughing Apple". A third song, "A Bad Night", was aimed as a single release. Following this, Stevens garnered a preference for Olympic Studios, compared to Decca Studios in West Hampstead where most of his other Deram output was recorded.

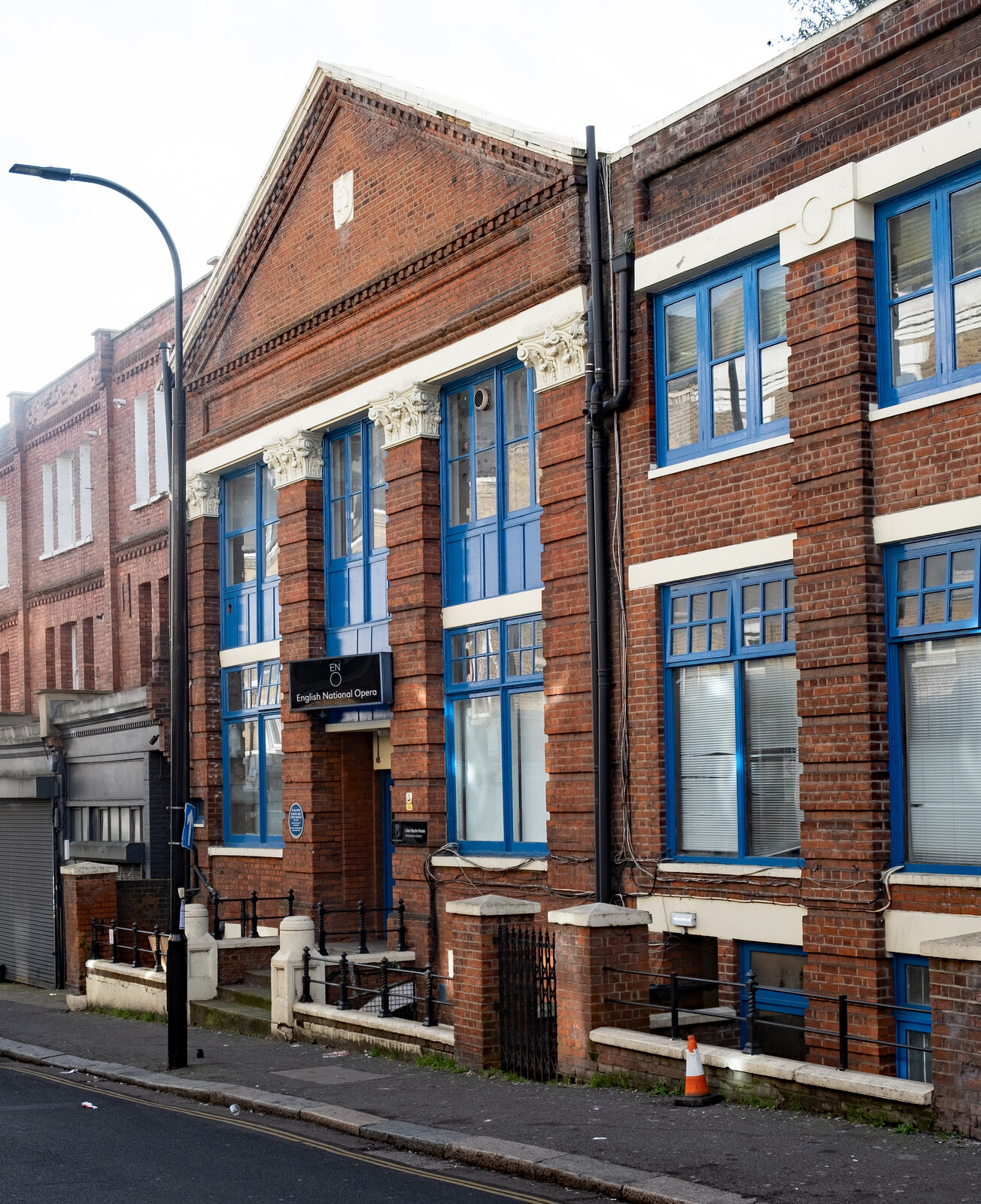
Most of New Masters was recorded at Decca Studios, despite Stevens' preference for Olympic Studios.

According to both Stevens and Hurst, the recording of New Master was "horrendous"; the latter admitted that lawyers were present in the studio during the recording sessions. Due to the contractual problems with Stevens, Decca believed the album might "have been their last shot with him", and thus forced him to record the rest of it at Decca Studios, despite his objections as he wanted "to use Olympic again". Despite this, Stevens wouldn't enter a recording studio for another few months to allow for Deram to release "A Bad Night" as a single, which they did on 28 July.

"A Bad Night" reached number 20 on the Record Retailer chart, which prompted Decca to rush him into Decca Studios as it was descending the charts on 24 September to cut an early rendition of "Come on Baby (Shift That Log)", which was ultimately discarded. The released recording of "Come on Baby" was ultimately recorded on 4 October, together with another outtake titled "Sing!" "Sing!", as well as another outtake titled "My Motorbike" were wiped and never repeated. On 5 October, "The First Cut Is the Deepest" and "I Love Them All" were recorded, with "I'm So Sleepy" and "Ceylon City" following during later dates in October. "Kitty", "Smash Your Heart" and "I'm Gonna Be King" were all taped in November, (Note: Writer John Tracy suggests that "Smash Your Heart" and "I'm Gonna King" may have been recorded at an "outside studio but not delivered to Deram until that November".) with the final recording session of songs aimed for album release occurred on 3 November when "Northern Wind" and "Blackness of the Night" were committed to tape.

Stevens played guitar and was backed by several session musicians during the recording sessions, as he had been for his debut album. Although most documentation regarding musicians on the tracks have been lost to time, it is known that it included Herbie Flowers and John Paul Jones (bass), Big Jim Sullivan (guitar), Nicky Hopkins (keyboards), Chris Hunt (drums), alongside a plethora of string and woodwind players; Hurst estimated 35 performers to be present during the Olympic recording session. In addition to producing the album, Hurst also contributed with rhythm guitar and backing vocals. In contrast to Matthew & Son, which was entirely orchestrated by Alan Tew, New Masters features five different music directors present: Tew Phil Dennys, David Whitaker, Ivor Raymonde, Des Champ. This reflected the conflict Stevens was facing during the album's recording process.

== Musical content and style ==
New Masters is musically generally similar to its predecessor Matthew & Son, containing the same "quirky folk pop". Virtually all tracks on the album feature string and brass arrangements in "overblown proportions", despite Stevens' disdain for them. Thus, the album is largely baroque pop, even though certain songs have "large, big orchestral pop" arrangements to them. According to writer Bill DeYoung, New Masters was a "deeper and darker" album than Matthew & Son, something which was reflected through songs such as "The First Cut Is the Deepest" and "Kitty". According to Charlesworth, the album was conceived as a more serious effort during a point in which Stevens' career stood at a crossroads between being a teenage pop idol and a serious, well established singer-songwriter. This was reflected by the album cover, which depicted Stevens in a "Regency-style jacket" with a white frilly shirt in the manner of a "restoration aristocrat"; this earnestness was also exemplified by the lack of liner notes in addition to naming side one and side two of the album "Canvas one and Canvas two", respectively.

Almost a Middle Eastern fiction. I was having fun with lyrics and storylines; I lived 'round the corner from the British Museum, so it probably had some influence on that song, and the idea of finding some precious stone which if you rubbed it like Aladdin's lamp would come to life, and flash and sparkle.

— Cat Stevens about "Moonstone" (2001)

Canvas one of the album opens with "Kitty", which was the sole single release from New Masters. (Note: "The Laughing Apple" had originally been released as the B-side of Stevens' single "A Bad Night", released on 28 July 1967.) The song sports a "busy arrangement", with Andy Neill likening it to the Zombies contemporary single "Care of Cell 44" (1967), due to the lyrical topic about a female prisoner. Neill categorizes "I'm So Sleepy" as "whimsical", whilst Charlesworth argues it sports a softer arrangement than much of the other material on the album. "Northern Wind" was inspired by the works of composer Maurice Ravel, featuring a "similar buildup" to his music. Originally written as part of an abandoned West End musical about the life of Billy the Kid, (Note: On the original release of New Masters, the track is simply known as "Northern Wind". However, Stevens has referred to the track as "Northern Wind (Death of Billy the Kid)", which is also the title of the song's re-recording for the album The Laughing Apple (2017).) it features backing vocals inspired by Wild West movies such as A Fistful of Dollars (1964). Owing to the arrangement, Neill compares "The Laughing Apple" to Love's album Forever Changes (1967), due to the "similarly ambitious production value". According to Stevens, the lyrics were a metaphor for letting "life take its course". (Note: Both "The Laughing Apple" and "Moonstone" were considered for single release.) Lyrically, "Smash Your Heart" regards a man breaking the heart of his partner, an uncommon motif amongst Stevens' text. Canvas one closes with "Moonstone", inspired by Stevens proximity to the British Museum, and lyrically tells an "Indiana Jones-style tale".

"The First Cut Is the Deepest" opens Canvas two, and is one of Stevens' most well-known compositions throughout his career. Written as an homage to Otis Redding, it was his first attempt at writing an R&B-style song. Stevens had written and sold it for £30 to his publishing company as early as 1965, but it was first recorded by P. P. Arnold in April 1967 after Stevens had passed up on releasing it as a single himself. Neill characterizes "I'm Gonna Be King" as a slower re-write of Stevens' third single "I'm Gonna Get Me a Gun", even though the lyrical content is vastly different, being a tale of a man with a "grandiose" world view. Neill comments that "Ceylon City" was the other "whimsical" track on New Masters, and is a somewhat personal track since it refers to Stevens' family directly, with "Ceylon" most likely being a reference to London. "Blackness of the Night" is one of the album's few tracks without a busy string arrangement, something Charlesworth comments made it comparable to his later, more commercially successful work. Similarly, Neill states that it acts as an "early clue to Cat's future direction". Stevens characterized it as his "folkie-protest song". "Come on Baby (Shift That Log)" holds a lyrical similarity to Stevens' bigger hit "Father and Son", where a child is left with a single parent; in "Father and Son", the child is left with his mother, whilst the inverse is true for "Come on Baby". "I Love Them All" tells the tale of a man who forgives his partner's infidelity, stating that he "loves them all" in regards to the secret pictures and letters he's found.

== Release and commercial performance ==
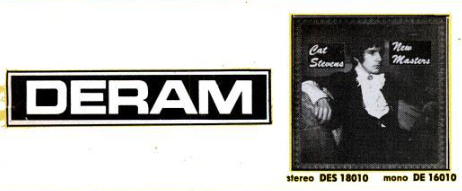
Advertisement for New Masters in Billboard

New Masters was initially slated for release in September 1967, but was delayed to allow for a revised track listing. On 1 December, Deram issued "Kitty", backed by "Blackness of the Night" as a single as a "taster of things to come". (Note: Catalogue number Deram 156.) The single only showed a mild performance on the charts, reaching number 47 for a single week, prompting Deram to rush-release New Masters in the UK on 15 December 1967 in both mono and stereo formats. (Note: Mono catalogue number DML 1018, stereo catalogue number SML 1018.) (Note: Writer John Tracy stated that New Masters was released during the "Christmas period", whereas Andy Neill opinioned it was issued in January 1968.) A release of New Masters followed in the United States during January 1968, where it was distributed through London Recordings. (Note: Mono catalogue number DE 18010, stereo catalogue number DES 18010.) Although the album received promotion in major trade magazines including Billboard, Decca was generally unwilling to promote the album due to the "potentially litigious" legal problems between Stevens' and Hurts resulting in it failing to chart entirely in both the UK or the US upon initial release. This marked a rampant decline in Stevens' initial popularity as a teenage idol.

Interest in Stevens' earlier output arose in the US following his chart success there as a folk rock singer with albums such as Tea for the Tillerman (1970) and Teaser and the Firecat (1971). This success prompted Deram to re-issue New Masters in a double album package with his debut album Matthew & Son in March 1971. (Note: Catalogue number DES 18005-10.) This release sold well enough to reach the Billboard 200 chart, peaking at number 173 in June 1971 during a 12 week run. Despite being a chart failure in the UK, New Masters was never deleted from the Deram catalogue, and re-issued multiple times during the 1970s. When Decca were in the process of re-releasing much of their pop catalogue on the compact disc format in the late 1980s, New Masters finally received such a release in 1989. (Note: Catalogue number 820 767-2.) This re-release also collected Stevens' four non-album singles during the later parts of his Deram career, "A Bad Night" (1967), "Lovely City (When Do You Laugh?)", "Here Comes My Wife" (1968) and "Where Are You" (1969). New Masters was issued on CD again in 2003, (Note: Catalogue number 981 082-2.) collecting his non-album Deram singles in addition to having the mono single versions for "Kitty", "Blackness of the Night" and "The Laughing Apple". Finally, New Masters was re-issued on vinyl for the first time since 1982 on 27 March 2020, this edition being remixed at Abbey Road Studios.

== Reception ==
=== Contemporary reviews ===
Professional ratings
Review scores
Source	Rating
Record Mirror	4/4 stars
New Musical Express	4/4 stars

Upon initial release, New Masters received primarily positive reviews in the UK press. In Disc and Music Echo, journalist Penny Valentine found that Cat Stevens' musical abilities came "off far better on an LP" than on singles, and considered the album to be better than his previous one. Writing for Record Mirror, journalists Peter Jones noted the album to have a "folky feel" which was a trademark for his music, and praised the song arrangements, believing the album to be "well recorded". Though they single out "Kitty", "I'm So Sleepy" and "Ceylon City" as the LP's most "striking tracks", the duo felt that Stevens' own interpretation of "The First Cut Is the Deepest" was inferior to P. P Arnold's original as it was "less frenetic and effective". They end the review by noting that they were unsure whether they "liked it [the album] or not", despite giving it four out of four stars.

New Musical Express reviewer Allen Evans believed that New Masters established Cat Stevens as a forceful beat singer, and noted the contrasting tempos, timbre and music genres found on the album. Evans found it impressive that Stevens had composed all of the LP's tracks, and singled out "Ceylon City" and the "Dylanesque" "Blackness of the Night" as his favorite tracks. He gave the LP four out of four stars. Chris Welch of Melody Maker opinioned that the music deserved "recognition", and believed the album was Stevens' best vocal performance thus far, likened his voice on certain tracks to "a sort of Arabian Tim Hardin". He praised the songs as being "often beautiful" and "picturesque", mostly due to the production of Mike Hurst and the arrangements by the various music directors. Though he noted the LP would've benefitted by including liner notes, he ended his review by stating that it was "surprising Cat hasn't had a hit single recently", owing to the strength of the material.

In the US, New Masters also received reviews in the major music trade publications, but was largely ignored by other reviewers. The anonymous reviewer in Billboard magazine wrote that the album was full of "highly inventive material", singling out "The Laughing Apple", "The First Cut Is the Deepest," and "Come on Baby (Shift That Log)" as highlights. The reviewer also opinioned that the rest of the material was "topnotch", predicting a breakthrough for Stevens in the US.

=== Retrospective assessment and legacy ===
Professional ratings
Review scores
Source	Rating
Stereo Review	Good
AllMusic	2.5/5 stars

Retrospectively, New Masters has received primarily mixed reviews by critics, mostly owing to the orchestration. Noel Coppage of Stereo Review found the album to be "outlandishly overproduced", with "needless blasts, tinkles, and rattles intrude on almost every song". He notes "Come on Baby (Shift That Log)" as an exception, but derides "Moonstone" as "buried under glop". Despite this, Coppage found that every song had appeal. AllMusic critic Bruce Eder stated that the album was as "uneven musically" as Stevens' debut album "was bold", but noted that the two albums were "more of the same" albeit believed New Masters to be less interesting as a "late 1967 release". He noted the albums diverse tracks, ranging from the "pop balladry" of "Smash Your Heart", the whimsiness of "Moonstone", the folky-pop "Kitty". He believed the material to be "highly derivative" in some cases. He singled out "The First Cut Is the Deepest" and "Come on Baby (Shift That Log)" as the album's highlights.

Stevens' parted way with Hurst shortly after the release of New Masters, this time prompted by Hurst booking Stevens onto a pantomime production, something he detested. When Stevens' declined the offer, the agent told Stevens' he was "making the biggest mistake of his life". For Hurst, 1968 was a "long interminable legal wrangle", all of which led AllMusic critic Bruce Eder to categorize New Masters as a "truly a lawyers' record". Although Stevens was allowed to produce the follow-up single "Lovely City (Where Do You Laugh)?" with Noel Walker, Deram were still unwilling to let Stevens' record in a singer-songwriter style, something that prompted Stevens to seek increasingly more expensive arrangements for his singles and studio sessions in order to prompt Deram to pre-emptively terminate his recording contract. Stevens owed Deram one final single by April 1969, which caused him to reunite with Hurst one final time for a studio session at Olympic. The song recorded, "Where Are You", was described by Hurst as their "swan song"; the single, released in June 1969, failed to chart after which Deram let go of his contract. Stevens subsequently signed with Island Records and recorded under producer Paul Samwell-Smith "by the end of the year".

On 2 March 1968, Stevens was hospitalized at the nursing home on Harley Street in London. Having been troubled by a cough throughout February, caused by his smoking and drinking, doctors diagnosed Stevens with tuberculosis. Stevens was transferred to the King Edward VII's Hospital, where he spent three months followed by "nine more [months] home in bed". According to Stevens', this period gave him time to reflect over life, as it were a near-death experience for him, and also because he spent "three months in bed" which gave him a long time to reflect. He garnered an interest in Eastern religions and the book The Secret Path, which talked about "philosophy, death," and the afterlife. Having lost faith in Christianity, Stevens started meditating, something that gave him a small "glimpse" that filled his life with hope. His songs became deeper and more philosophical following his diagnosis, and inspired by folk artists such as Bob Dylan and Joni Mitchell, he took a more "organic approach to his music", and emerged back onto the music scene with Mona Bone Jakon (1970), containing "plaintive and highly personal songs. For the 50th anniversary of New Masters, Stevens re-recorded four songs from the album; "I'm So Sleepy" "Northern Wind", "The Laughing Apple" and "Blackness of the Night". The reason for revisiting these tracks was to envision them in his folk-style, as they were originally "overcooked with big band arrangements". The tracks were released on Stevens' 15th studio album The Laughing Apple on 15 September 2017.

== Track listing ==
All tracks written by Cat Stevens. Track lengths adapted from the 1989 re-issue of New Masters.

Canvas one (Note: The back sleeve of the album's cover has the A- and B-sides labeled as "Canvas one" and "Canvas two", respectively.)

1. "Kitty" – 2:17
2. "I'm So Sleepy" – 2:17
3. "Northern Wind" – 2:45
4. "The Laughing Apple" – 2:33
5. "Smash Your Heart" – 2:55
6. "Moonstone" – 2:11

Canvas two

1. "The First Cut Is the Deepest" – 2:59
2. "I'm Gonna Be King" – 2:24
3. "Ceylon City" – 2:23
4. "Blackness of the Night" – 2:25
5. "Come on Baby (Shift That Log)" – 3:42
6. "I Love Them All" – 2:04

== Personnel ==
Musicians

- Cat Stevens – lead vocals, guitar
- Big Jim Sullivan – guitar
- Herbie Flowers – bass guitar
- John Paul Jones – bass guitar
- Nicky Hopkins – keyboards
- Chris Hunt – drums

Production

- Mike Hurst – producer, backing vocals, rhythm guitar
- Phil Dennys – music director, arrangement (1, 7, 11–12)
- David Whitaker – music director, arrangement (2, 9)
- Ivor Raymonde – music director, arrangement (3, 10)
- Alan Tew – music director, arrangement (4, 6)
- Des Champ – music director, arrangement (5, 8)

== Charts ==
Weekly chart performance for New Masters
Chart (1971)	Peak position
US Billboard 200	173

== Sources ==
- Brown, George (2006). The Complete Illustrated Biography & Discography. United Kingdom: Brown. OCLC 77117322.
- Charlesworth, Chris (1984). Cat Stevens: The Definitive Career Biography. United Kingdom: Proteus. ISBN 978-086-27-618-13. OCLC 471584405.
- DeYoung, Bill; Stevens, Cat (2001). Cat Stevens (Box Set). US: A&M. 981 082-1 – via MusicBrainz.
- Neill, Andy (2003). New Masters (CD). Europe: Deram. 981 082-2.
- Roberts, David (2006). British Hit Singles & Albums (19th ed.). United Kingdom: Guinness World Records Limited. ISBN 1-904994-10-5. OCLC 64098209.
- Stevens, Cat / Yusuf (2025). Cat On The Road To Findout: The Official Autobiography. United Kingdom: Constable. ISBN 978-1-40872-080-6. OCLC 1541792701.
- Tracy, John (1989). New Masters (CD). United States: Deram. 820 767-2.
