= A Bad Night (song) =

1967 single written and recorded by Cat Stevens

- German single sleeve

Single by Cat Stevens
- B-side: "The Laughing Apple"
- Released: 28 July 1967
- Recorded: 3 July 1967
- Studio: Olympic, London
- Genre: Orchestral pop
- Length: 3:07
- Label: Deram
- Songwriter: Cat Stevens
- Producer: Mike Hurst

Cat Stevens singles chronology
"I'm Gonna Get Me a Gun" (1967)	"A Bad Night" (1967)	"Kitty" (1967)

Performance on Beat-Club
- "A Bad Night" on YouTube

"A Bad Night" is a song written and recorded by the British singer-songwriter Cat Stevens. Stevens was experiencing commercial success in mid-1967 with several hit singles, leading to long tours where "A Bad Night" was written. The song is an amalgamation of three compositions, featuring different tempo changes and arrangement. An orchestral pop with experimental elements, it features backmasking and flanging effects. "A Bad Night" was recorded on 3 July 1967 at his first session at Olympic Studios with producer Mike Hurst and music director Arthur Greenslade.

On 28 July 1967, Deram Records rush-released "A Bad Night" with "The Laughing Apple" on the B-side as Cat Stevens' fourth single release. Stevens performed the track on several BBC programs, including Top of the Pops. The single was a relative commercial failure, peaking only at number 20 on the Record Retailer chart in August 1967. It fared better outside of Europe, reaching the top-10 in Malaysia and Rhodesia. "A Bad Night" was excluded from his second studio album New Masters, and received primarily positive reviews in the press. Stevens himself had a mixed opinion over the track retrospectively.

== Composition and recording ==
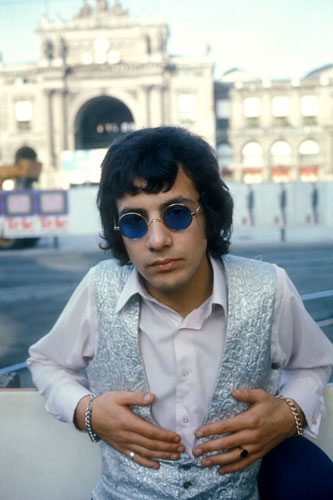
Cat Stevens in October 1967

By July 1967, singer-songwriter Cat Stevens had become an "established name on the British pop scene", having scored three hit singles with "I Love My Dog", "Matthew and Son" (both 1966) and "I'm Gonna Get Me a Gun" (1967), alongside a top-ten album with Matthew & Son. With the exception of "I Love My Dog", which drew inspiration from Yusef Lateef's works, his early output generally consisted of lavishly orchestrated baroque pop tracks which were preferred by both his producer Mike Hurst and record label Deram. Stevens himself was caught up with tours and television performances, which earned him £1,000 weekly. It was during one of these tours that the basis of "A Bad Night" was initially conceived. According to Beat Instrumental magazine, "A Bad Night" was a mould of three compositions that had "been running around his brain", but proved unsuccessful on their own.

As recorded by Cat Stevens, "A Bad Night" featured three separate tempo changes, all of which sported separate arrangements, running just over 3 minutes in length. The first 48 seconds of the song feature Stevens' vocals accompanied solely by an acoustic guitar, which builds up to the tempo and then abruptly switches once the chorus arrives. Stevens described the song as experimental, and it features backmasked "cymbal flourishes" alongside an early example of flanging in British pop, which Beat Instrumental journalist Crotus Pike found comparable to the Small Faces contemporary hit single "Itchycoo Park". In the words of Chris Charlesworth, "A Bad Night" was Stevens' first "ambitious orchestral pop record"; Stevens' publicist stated during the single's pre-release that "There is just about everything on the record. Name an instrument and it's there". Lyrically, "A Bad Night" concerns a breakup between a couple, leading to a "bad night" for the male partner.

"A Bad Night" was initially recorded on 3 July 1967 at the first recording session for what would become his second studio album New Masters (1967), together with "The Laughing Apple" and "Moonstone". It was Stevens' first recording session held at the Olympic Sound Studios in Barnes, London; the rest of his Deram output was recorded at Decca Studios in West Hampstead due to a contractual obligation, even though Stevens preferred Olympic. (Note: The sole exception being Stevens' last Deram single "Where Are You", recorded in March 1969. Stevens later partly recorded two of his most critically acclaimed albums at Olympic; Mona Bone Jakon and Tea for the Tillerman (both 1970).) According to producer Mike Hurst, the song's arrangement led to him "going over the top", and the recording features 35 members of an orchestra playing. Other session musicians on the track included keyboardist Nicky Hopkins. This session was additionally the only time Arthur Greenslade was hired as a music director on a recording by Stevens, his earlier output having been recorded with Alan Tew.

== Release and commercial performance ==
Deram rush-released "A Bad Night" as Stevens' fourth 7-inch single on 28 July 1967 in the UK, with "The Laughing Apple" on the B-side. (Note: Catalogue number Deram DM 140.) Journalist Andy Neill commented that the single's release was "belated", as his previous record "I'm Gonna Get Me a Gun" had been issued as early as March. Stevens performed the single's A-side on a variety of BBC programs, including Monday Monday, Dee Time, and Saturday Club. During his appearance for Top of the Pops, Stevens wore a kaftan during the performance of "A Bad Night". A release of "A Bad Night" in the US on London-distributed Deram followed in August 1967. In conjunction with the release of "A Bad Night", Stevens was scheduled to travel to Mexico in August 1967 to promote the single, but he cancelled the trip to continue work on New Masters and producing a record by Sasha Caro.

"A Bad Night" entered the Record Retailer chart on 8 August 1967 at a position of number 49, before peaking at number 20 on 29 August. It dropped off the charts on 26 September, having spent 8 weeks on there. On the other national British charts, "A Bad Night" fared slightly worse, peaking at number 21 on the chart compiled by the New Musical Express, number 24 on the chart by Melody Maker, and number 25 on the chart by Disc and Music Echo. Although a top-20 hit on the Record Retailer chart, it was outperformed by Stevens' two earlier singles "Matthew and Son" and "I'm Gonna Get Me a Gun", both of which had peaked within the top-ten. Although it charted in the Netherlands, "A Bad Night" had the most commercial appeal outside of Europe, becoming the third of five top-twenty singles Cat Stevens achieved in New Zealand between 1967 and 1969, in addition to peaking within the top-ten of both the charts in Malaysia and Rhodesia. Stevens believed that the pirate radio stations were the primary reason the single charted, stating that it was a "complicated song" and that "the occasional plug on BBC" radio would not have made the single sink in.

Both sides of the single were recorded too late to be included on Cat Stevens' debut album Matthew & Son. "The Laughing Apple" received release on his second studio album New Masters, which was issued in the UK on 15 December 1967, although "A Bad Night" was excluded from it. Charlesworth suggests the album, which failed to chart, might have sold better if "A Bad Night" had been included on it. "A Bad Night" received its first album release on the Decca Records compilation The World Of Cat Stevens in 1970, following his departure from the label. The song's first US album release occurred in 1972 on the compilation Very Young and Early Songs, which reached number 94 on the Billboard 200. Stevens re-recorded "The Laughing Apple" in 2017, which was released as the title track of his fifteenth studio album released on 15 September 2017.

== Critical reception and legacy ==
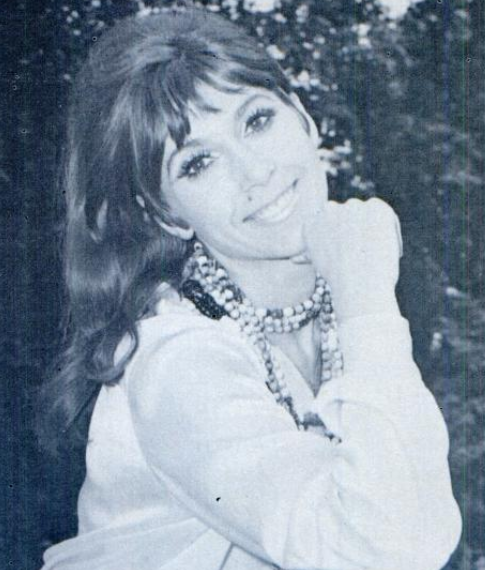
Anita Harris gave the single a positive review.

Upon original release, the single received primarily positive reviews in the press. In a blind date for Melody Maker, actress Anita Harris stated "A Bad Night" to be a "variety show" and "certainly different". She stated that the song provided a "great dance routine" and is "a lot of fun", though noted that it probably "wasn't meant to be taken seriously". Though she never "would've guessed" it was a Cat Stevens song, she believed it would become a big hit. Penny Valentine of Disc and Music Echo was more skeptical of the single, and wrote that it did "not hit with such immediacy as his other singles" and compared it to the works of Leonard Bernstein in intensity and style. She noted that she would have expected "a masterpiece instead of just a good record", which was "flattering" but "unhelpful" for Stevens, though also quipped that she might have been "overcritical". She positively reviewed the opening buildup into a "La Bamba" gallop, and ended by believing it would become a hit.

Writing for the New Musical Express, journalist Derek Johnson jokingly suggested that he would not be "surprised" if a kitchen sink was included in the recording process of "A Bad Night", due to the plethora of other instruments used. He positively noted the build-up of the song, which caught him "by surprise" as it differed from Stevens' earlier recordings. Although he believed the recording to be "nice", he found the single to have an "unusual rhythm" that did not help the commerciability of the song. He closed the review by announcing "The Laughing Apple" to be on par with the A-side, though it had "strange lyrics". In Record Mirror, Peter Jones praised the contrasting tempos of "A Bad Night", and believed it to be a hit. He was surprised over the fact it was a Cat Stevens record, however. In the US, Cash Box magazine wrote that the "Spiraling speed in the opener provides an attractive intro" to "a solid rock side that could bring Cat Stevens a sampling of stateside fame".

Cat Stevens himself has expressed mixed views of the song. A short while after release, he believed "it didn't live up to his expectations" and was unsure if the experimental nature of it "worked out". Despite being disappointed it "was not doing better", he was glad "he took the chance". Mike Hurst praised the song's arrangement, believing it to be his "Manna from heaven", but believed Stevens most likely knew he "went a step too far" with the song since the record was a "stiff". Despite this, he "loved it then" and "still does". He later suggested it to be "outlandish" and suggested they "went over the top" since people weren't interested in the record. Neill believed it was an "industry record"; one liked by people in the music industry but not by the record-buying public. Nonetheless, "A Bad Night" was the first major letdown for Stevens, whose career was going into a "nosedive"; "Kitty", the follow-up to "A Bad Night", only peaked at number 47 on the Record Retailer chart.

== Charts ==
Weekly chart performance for "A Bad Night"
Chart (1967)	Peak position
Australia (Kent Music Report)	87
Malaysia (Radio Malaysia)	4
Netherlands (Dutch Top 40)	30
New Zealand (Listener)	15
Rhodesia (Lyons Maid)	9
UK (Disc and Music Echo)	25
UK (New Musical Express)	21
UK (Melody Maker)	24
UK (Record Retailer)	20
