= Lovely City (When Do You Laugh?) =

1968 song by Cat Stevens

- West German single sleeve

Single by Cat Stevens
- B-side: "Image of Hell"
- Released: 23 February 1968
- Recorded: 26 January 1968
- Studio: Decca, London
- Genre: Folk pop; psychedelic pop
- Length: 3:07
- Label: Deram
- Songwriter: Cat Stevens
- Producers: Cat Stevens; Noel Walker

Cat Stevens singles chronology
"Kitty" (1967)	"Lovely City (When Do You Laugh?)" (1968)	"Here Comes My Wife" (1968)

Audio
- "Lovely City (When Do You Laugh?)" on YouTube

"Lovely City (When Do You Laugh?)" (also known as "Lovely Cities") is a song written and recorded by English singer-songwriter Cat Stevens in 1968. Following the release of his second studio album New Masters, Stevens parted ways with producer Mike Hurst in favor of a new style in his music. "Lovely City" is a folk-pop song influenced by psychedelic pop and lyrics about the West End of London. It was recorded in January 1968 at Decca Studios and was the first song he produced with Decca producer Noel Walker.

Deram Records released "Lovely City (When Do You Laugh?)" as a single in Britain on 23 February 1968, with "Image of Hell" as the B-side. It was the first single by Stevens to fail to reach the UK's Record Retailer chart, albeit it became a top-ten hit in Malaysia and Singapore. Upon its original release, the single received mixed critical reviews regarding the song's arrangement. Shortly after the song's release, Stevens was diagnosed with tuberculosis, effectively halting his career for several months.

== Background and recording ==
On 1 December 1967, Cat Stevens released his fifth British single "Kitty", followed shortly by his second studio album New Masters on 15 December. Both the single and album failed commercially, stemming from the fact that Decca Records refused to promote them. Stevens wanted to terminate his contract with producer Mike Hurst, which occurred after an agent hired by Hurst booked Stevens onto a pantomime. The period was marred by contractual troubles, culminating in Hurst describing the year 1968 as "one long interminable legal wrangle". Stevens believed he needed to switch genres following his split with Hurst, and asked Decca for a "change of style" following the release of "Kitty", which they granted.

Journalist Andy Neill identified "Lovely City (When Do You Laugh?)" as a "Moody Blues-style" track, with George Brown writing that it contained tinges of Stevens' earlier folk-pop tracks despite being heading towards a psychedelic pop direction with fuzz guitar. Progrography claimed it to be a "vaguely psychedelic affair". Lyrically, the song was a commentary on the "superficiality of a happy society", with Bill DeYoung adding that it depicted an "envigorating snapshot of the bustling West End".

Stevens recorded "Lovely City (When Do You Laugh?)" on 26 January 1968 at Decca Studios in West Hampstead. (Note: Sources are generally conflicted regarding the recording date of "Lovely City". Writer Bill DeYoung states that the track was recorded in November 1967, whereas John Tracy puts the recording date in 1968.) In addition to singing, Stevens also played twelve-string guitar on the song. Drummer Chris Hunt, who previously played on "The First Cut Is the Deepest" from the album New Masters, claimed to have performed on "Lovely City" but expressed doubt if it was on the released version or not. The music director for both the song and its B-side "Image of Hell" was Lew Warburton. "Lovely City" was a result of the split between Stevens and Hurst his first song not produced by the latter. Instead, the session was headed by Stevens himself alongside Decca staff producer Noel Walker. (Note: Once more, production credit for the single differs. DeYoung identifies Hurst as the single's producer, despite their split. Promotional demo copies of the single credit Walker exclusively as the producer. Stock copies of the single and Tracy identifies it as a co-production between Stevens and Walker, as does Steven himself in his 2025 autobiography.)

== Release and reception ==
"Lovely City (When Do You Laugh?)" was released as Cat Stevens' sixth single in the UK by Deram Records on 23 February 1968, with "Images of Hell" on the B-side. (Note: Catalogue number Deram DM 156.) On original promotional copies and various foreign releases, the song is credited simply as "Lovely Cities". The single was the first of his to not chart on the Record Retailer chart in the UK, following five straight top-50 hits up until that point. As it failed to chart in the UK, Deram did not release the single in the US. The single fared the best in Asia and Oceania, where it reached number eight in Malaysia and number ten in Singapore. In Australia, "Lovely City" reached number 27 on the 6PR chart in Perth, after which music historian David Kent calculated a retrospective chart position of 100 on the Kent Music Report. Although not originally part of New Masters, it was included as a bonus track on the 1989 and 2003 re-issues of the album, as well as the 2001 box set Cat Stevens – In Search of the Centre of the Universe.

In Disc and Music Echo, journalist Penny Valentine provided the single with a mixed review. Although she noted the track to have a "nice tune", her belief was that it was "overfilled with production and things going on" despite having changed producers. She additionally commented that the single did not have lyrics that the audience could identify with. Similarly, in a blind date for Melody Maker, singer Andy Fairweather Low voiced a mixed opinion, believing the production and arrangement to be "beautiful", despite commenting dislike for the track's fuzz guitar, considering it to not be one of his best". The magazine's own critic Chris Welch identified the track as lacking hit potential, despite the song's "originality" and sharing Stevens "knack for writing unusual songs". Peter Jones of Record Mirror commented that despite being an "off-beat" single, he was disappointed and found parts of it square. He noted Stevens to be an "ideas man" rather than an instantly recognizable singer. One of few positive reviews came from Derek Johnson of the New Musical Express, who opined that the single retained "the cantering beat and rumbling busy backing" of his prior single, believing the arrangement to command "just as much attention as Cat himself". Additionally, he found it catchier than "Kitty".

Less than two weeks after the single's release, on 3 March 1968, Stevens was hospitalized for a "nagging cough" and received the diagnosis of tuberculosis. After a few short notices in trade magazines, Stevens remained "out of the spotlight" for almost nine months following his diagnosis, contributing to his commercial decline; in 2025, Stevens reflected on this period as being similar to a party balloon, "rapidly deflating" and heading for the "trashcan of popped has-beens". Progrography notes that the single bore traces of "developing social conscience", but noted it not to be something to get "too ruffled about". DeYoung believed the track benefited from the "more is more" approach of Stevens' Deram recordings, and Hurst categorized it as "nice" and as a "light at the end of a gloomy tunnel", following the lyrical "soul searching" on many of Stevens' other recordings.

== Charts ==
Weekly chart performance for "Lovely City (When Do You Laugh?)"
Chart (1968)	Peak position
Australia (Kent Music Report)	100
Malaysia (Radio Malaysia)	8
Singapore (Radio Singapore)	10
