= Where Are You (Cat Stevens song) =

- Netherlands single sleeve

Single by Cat Stevens
- B-side: "The View from the Top"
- Released: 13 June 1969
- Recorded: March 1969
- Studio: Olympic, London
- Genre: Folk pop
- Length: 3:00
- Label: Deram
- Songwriter: Cat Stevens
- Producer: Mike Hurst

Cat Stevens singles chronology
"Here Comes My Wife" (1968)	"Where Are You" (1969)	"Lady D'Arbanville" (1970)

Audio
- "Where Are You" on YouTube

"Where Are You" is a song written and recorded by English singer-songwriter Cat Stevens in March 1969. The song was recorded at Olympic Studios in London and was released as a non-album single on 13 June 1969; becoming Stevens's final single with Deram Records and producer Mike Hurst.

== Background and recording ==
Not long after the release of Cat Stevens's second album New Masters, his career began to "nosedive". Meanwhile, Stevens's relationship with his producer Mike Hurst began to deteriorate, which resulted in the presence of lawyers in the studio during the recording of New Masters. Stevens's lawyer sent a letter to Hurst claiming that Stevens had signed the recording contract as a minor, rendering it invalid. Hurst has since described 1968 as a "long interminable legal wrangle" for him. Stevens's next singles did not crack the top 50 and were far from successful. On 2 March 1968, he was hospitalized with a diagnosis of tuberculosis which put a halt to his career.

By 1969, Stevens had nearly disappeared from the British singles market. However, Deram approached Hurst and proposed a new single with Stevens. Stevens still owed Deram one more single, so he arrived at Hurst's office and played some songs on his guitar. Stevens told Hurst he wanted to record the songs "very basically", with only him and the guitar, contrary to the heavily orchestrated songs Stevens had previously recorded with Deram. Hurst told Stevens to "forget it", but eventually relented.

On 14 March 1969, Stevens recorded his first attempt at "Where Are You", alongside a song titled "Younger Generation"; both were rejected and scrapped. Stevens returned a few weeks later and re-recorded "Where Are You". Hurst has described the finished song as "just acoustic guitar and a small string section". Music archivist George Brown noted that the song sounds more like Stevens's later work. Stevens has stated that classical music was an influence on the song, as well as the French genre which at the time Stevens was obsessed with.

The song was not successful, but within a year Stevens would sign with Island Records, with whom he recorded and released albums like Tea for the Tillerman and Teaser and the Firecat, which elevated him to global stardom.

== Release and reception ==
It was mainly the song that made me decide to make a single. I wrote it about two months ago and liked it so much. I decided to talk to Mike Hurst into recording me with it - he took a bit of talking into it, too. It's not an instant hit song, perhaps, but basically I wanted to make a nice record.

— Cat Stevens on "Where Are You" in a July 1969 interview with Melody Maker

The single was released on 13 June 1969, with "The View from the Top" as the B-side (catalog no. DM 260). "The View from the Top" was written about Stevens's lonely view from the rooftops of London; Mike Vickers assisted with its recording.

Andy Neill describes the single as having "flopped completely", while Stevens simply said it "wasn't a great hit", though adding he was "quite happy with it", and calling it one of his favorite tracks. Hurst rendered "Where Are You" as his "swan song" with Stevens, stating it was "a sad one at that". Music journalist Chris Charlesworth speculated that Stevens purposefully "kept the trump cards up his sleeve" and held on to his better work, as during his recovery period he had written many songs, including "Father and Son". The single failed to chart.
