= Chris Charlesworth =

British music journalist, author and publisher

- Occupations: Journalist, editor
- Employer: Omnibus Press
- Spouse: Lisa Pettibone
- Children: 2
- Chris Charlesworth's voice recorded 2011

Chris Charlesworth is a British music journalist, author, and publicist. Between 1983 and 2016, he was the managing editor of Omnibus Press. He has worked as an executive producer for the Who, and as a publicist for David Bowie's from 1979 to 1981, while Bowie was signed to RCA Records.

Having started his career as a journalist on the Craven Herald & Pioneer in his home town of Skipton, Charlesworth began writing about music for the Bradford Telegraph. Charlesworth wrote for Melody Maker from 1970 to 1977, being variously its News Editor and US Editor from 1973 based in New York City.

Notable interviews for Melody Maker include; John Lennon, Paul McCartney, David Bowie, Led Zeppelin, the Who, Rod Stewart & the Faces, the Byrds, Bruce Springsteen, Elton John, the Beach Boys, Eric Clapton, CSN&Y, the Band, Black Sabbath, Slade, Paul Simon, Alice Cooper, Traffic, Free, Santana, the Eagles, Deep Purple, Yes, Frank Zappa, Iggy Pop, the Bee Gees and Steely Dan.

Charlesworth has contributed to numerous other magazines in the US and UK and written books on many rock artists.

In 1995, at Pete Townshend's request, Charlesworth compiled and co-produced the Who's 4-CD boxed set 30 Years of Maximum R&B, released by Polydor Records internationally and by MCA Records in the US, and was subsequently involved in the upgrade of The Who's back catalogue for remastered CDs.

Charlesworth lives in Surrey.

== Selected works ==
- Cat Stevens - The definitive career biography. Proteus Pub Co. 1985. ISBN 978-0862761813.
- Slade: Feel The Noize. Omnibus Press. 1984. ISBN 071190538X.
- Townshend: A Career Biography. Proteus. 1984. ISBN 0862762464.)
- David Bowie: Profile. Omnibus Press. 1981. ISBN 978-0-906071-67-0.
- The Who - the illustrated biography. Omnibus Press. 1982. ISBN 978-0-7119-0053-0.
- Deep Purple. Omnibus Press. 1983. ISBN 978-0-7119-0174-2.
- David Bowie Archive. Omnibus Press. 1987. ISBN 978-0-7119-1066-9.
- Elton John. Bobcat Books. 1987. ISBN 978-0-7119-1035-5.
- The Complete Guide to the Music of Paul Simon and Simon & Garfunkel. Omnibus Press. 1996. ISBN 978-0-7119-5597-4.
- The complete guide to the music of the Who. Omnibus Press. 2004. ISBN 978-1-84449-428-6.
- Twenty Five Albums that Rocked the World. Omnibus Press. 2009. ISBN 978-1-84772-626-1.
- David Bowie Black Book. Omnibus Press. 2013. ISBN 978-1-78305-183-0.
- Rock Stars at Home. Apollo Publishers. 2019. ISBN 978-1-94806-228-2.
- Tommy at 50. Apollo Publishers. 2019. ISBN 978-1-94806-240-4.

== Discography ==
- The Who
  - The Who by Numbers - executive producer
  - Thirty Years of Maximum R&B
