= Deram Records =

British music label, 1966–1996

- Parent company: Decca Records (UK)
- Founded: 1966
- Genre: Rock, pop
- Country of origin: United Kingdom
- Location: London

Deram Records was a subsidiary record label of Decca Records established in the United Kingdom in 1966. At the time, U.K. Decca was a different company from the Decca label in the United States, which was owned by MCA Inc. Deram recordings were distributed in the U.S. through UK Decca's American branch known as London Records. Deram was active until 1979, then continued as a reissue label.

== History ==
=== 1966–1968 ===
In the 1960s, Decca recording engineers experimented with ways of improving stereo recordings. They created a technique they named "Decca Panoramic Sound." The term "Deramic" was created as abbreviation of this. The new concept "allowed for more space between instruments, rendering these sounds softer to the ear." Early stereo recordings of popular music usually were mixed with sounds to the hard left, centre, or hard right only. This was because of the technical limitations of the professional 4-track reel-to-reel recorders, which were considered state of the art until 1967.

Decca initially conceived Deram Records as an outlet for Deramic Sound recordings of contemporary pop and rock music, however, not all of the early recordings on Deram used this technique. 'Deramic Sound' was intended to create recordings that had a more natural stereo spread. The basic difference was that, instead of overdubbing and mixing four individual (mono) tracks from a four-track recorder, the Decca recording engineers used a pair of four-track machines to layer multiple two-channel (stereo) recordings. This new concept, with additional tracks, permitted the engineer to place instruments more easily in any position within the stereo field.

To launch the 'Deramic Sound' concept, Deram issued a series of six easy listening orchestral pop albums in October 1967. The albums all included the word Night in the title, i.e. Strings in the Night, Brass in the Night, etc. Artists in this series included Gordon Franks, Peter Knight, and Tony Osborne. The label was soon reinvented as a rival to early pre-punk 'indie' record companies like Island Records and moulded into a home for 'progressive' or 'psychedelic' artists. Among the first recordings in this series was the November 1967 album release Days of Future Passed by the Moody Blues, while Crocheted Doughnut Ring and Beverley Martyn were also signed to the label around this time.

Professional eight-track recorders began to appear in many British studios starting with Advision Studios and Trident Studios in early 1968. The eight-track machines were far more flexible than the dual four-track recorder setup. By 1969, Decca had obtained its own eight-track recorder. Since Decca engineers no longer had more tracks than other major studios, the 'Deramic Sound' concept quickly became outdated and was dropped.

=== 1969–1982 ===
The roster later included British jazz and folk. Some of the more progressive jazz musicians of the late 1960s were released under the Deram imprint, including Mike Gibbs, John Surman, and Mike Westbrook. Deram albums bore a DML prefix for mono and an SML prefix for stereo releases. As with other UK Decca subsidiary labels, Deram's U.S. counterpart was distributed by London Records. Decca positioned it against Island Records, Harvest Records (started by EMI), and Vertigo Records (started by Philips Records), but it failed to compete. An 'extra' progressive series with SDL prefixes did not improve the situation.

From the start, Decca placed pop records next to progressive artists on Deram. Cat Stevens found early success there before moving to Island Records, and David Bowie's first album appeared on the label. Three of Deram's earliest hits, Procol Harum's "A Whiter Shade of Pale" and the Move's "Night of Fear" and "I Can Hear the Grass Grow", were produced outside the company by artists not directly signed to Deram. They were part of a deal with Straight Ahead Productions, which later moved its acts to EMI and had them released on the re-introduced Regal Zonophone imprint.

In 1969, Decca launched Nova, a progressive label that lasted less than a year. This caused further confusion as simultaneous releases on Deram Nova and Decca Nova appeared. Decca released Justin Hayward's Songwriter (1977) and Night Flight (1980) vinyl albums on Deram. In 1980, Sir Edward Lewis sold Decca to PolyGram, which put its new acquisition under the control of Roger Ames. Even though the label name was briefly used in the early 1980s for records by Bananarama, the Mo-dettes, and Splodgenessabounds, Ames decided to focus on Decca (for classical music) and London Recordings (for pop music), with London run as his own 'semi-autonomous indie' from within the major. From this point Deram was used as a reissue imprint for other recordings in the Decca/London catalogue and was eventually sold to Universal/UMG as part of Decca Records (London went with Ames to WMG, which sold it to French indie Because Music in 2017)

== Discography (singles) ==
=== 1966 ===
Month	Cat. No.	Artist	Title	Notes
September	101	Beverley	"Happy New Year"/"Where the Good Times Are"	
September	102	Cat Stevens	"I Love My Dog"/"Portobello Road"	No. 28
October	103	The Gibsons	"Two Kinds of Lovers"/"Hey Girl"	
October	104	Barry Mason	"Over the Hills and Far Away"/"Collection of Recollections"	
November	105	The Truth	"Jingle Jangle"/"Hey Gyp"	
November	106	The Eyes of Blue	"Up and Down"/"Heart Trouble"	
December	107	David Bowie	"Rubber Band"/"The London Boys"	
December	108	Chim Kothari	"Sitar 'n' Spice"/"Indian Bat"	
December	109	The Move	"Night of Fear"/"Disturbance"	No. 2
December	110	Cat Stevens	"Matthew and Son"/"Granny"	No. 2

=== 1967 ===
Month	Cat. No.	Artist	Title	Notes
January	111	The Pyramid	"Summer of Last Year"/"Summer Evening"	
February	112	Whistling Jack Smith	"I Was Kaiser Bill's Batman"/"The British Grin and Bear"	No. 5
February	113	West Coast Delegation	"Reach the Top"/"Mister Personality"	
February	114	The Eyes of Blue	"Supermarket Full of Cans"/"Don't Ask Me To Mend Your Broken Heart"	
March	115	Double Feature	"Baby Get Your Head Screwed On"/"Come on Baby"	
March	116	Sir Alec and His Boys	"I'm a Believer"/"Green Green Grass of Home"	
March	117	The Move	"I Can Hear the Grass Grow"/"Wave the Flag and Stop the Train"	No. 5
March	118	Cat Stevens	"I'm Gonna Get Me a Gun"/"School Is Out"	No. 6
March	119	The Gibsons	"The Magic Book"/"You Know I Need Your Loving"	
April	120	Warm Sounds	"Birds and Bees"/"Doo Dah"	
April	121	The Quik	"Love Is a Beautiful Thing"/"Bert's Apple Crumble"	
April	122	Denny Laine	"Say You Don't Mind"/"Ask the People"	
April	123	David Bowie	"The Laughing Gnome"/"The Gospel According to Tony Day"	No. 6(1973 RCA re-release)
April	124	Mike Redway	"Casino Royale"/"My Poem for You"	
April	125	The Outer Limits	"Just One More Chance"/"Help Me Please"	
May	126	Procol Harum	"A Whiter Shade of Pale"/"Lime Street Blues"	No. 1
May	127	The Wards of Court	"All Night Girl"/"How Could You Say One Thing"	
June	128	Les Reed Orchestra	"Imogene"/"The Pay Off 28"	
June	129	Whistling Jack Smith	"Hey There Little Miss Mary"/"I Was Bizet's Carmen"	
June	130	The Syn	"Created By Clive"/"Grounded"	
June	131	Honeybus	"Delighted to See You"/"The Breaking Up Scene"	
June	132	Robb and Dean Douglas	"I Can Make It With You"/"'Phone Me"	
June	133	Jon Gunn	"I Just Made Up My Mind"/"Now It's My Turn"	
July	134	Rubber Bootz	"Joy Ride"/"Chicano"	
July	135	David Bowie	"Love You Till Tuesday"/"Did You Ever Have a Dream?"	
July	136	Amen Corner	"Gin House Blues"/"I Know"	No. 12
July	137	Beverley/D. Cordell Teatime Ensemble	"Museum"/"A Quick One for Sanity"	
July	138	Richard Kerr	"Happy Birthday Blues"/"Mother's Blue-Eyed Angel"	
July	139	The Quik	"King of the World"/"My Girl"	
July	140	Cat Stevens	"A Bad Night"/"The Laughing Apple"	No. 20
August	142	The Flower Pot Men	"Let's Go to San Francisco" (Part One)/(Part Two)	No. 4
August	143	Bill Fay	"Some Good Advice"/"Screams in the Ears"	
August	144	The Cuppa T	"Miss Pinkerton"/"Brand New World"	
September	141	Martin's Magic Sounds	"Mon Amour, Mon Amour"/"Midem Melody"	
September	145	The Syn	"Flowerman"/"14 Hour Technicolour Dream"	
September	146	The Virgin Sleep	"Love"/"Halliford House"	
September	147	John Street & The Inmates of Number 12	"Keep a Little Love"/"My Kind of Luck"	
September	148	Robb & Dean Douglas	"Rose Growing in the Ruins"/"Gentle People"	
September	150	The 23rd Turnoff	"Michael Angelo"/"Leave Me Here"	
September	151	Amen Corner	"The World of Broken Hearts"/"Nema"	No. 26
October	149	Danny Williams	"Never My Love"/"Whose Little Girl Are You"	
October	152	Honeybus	"In Your Life"/"Throw My Love Away"	
October	153	Timebox	"Don't Make Promises"/"Walking Through the Streets of My Mind"	
October	154	Sol Raye	"While I'm Here"/"To Be With You"	
October	155	The Quik	"I Can't Sleep"/"Soul Full of Sorrow"	
November	157	Mike Redway	"Don't Speak of Love"/"Sometimes I Remember"	
November	158	Granny's Intentions	"The Story of David"/"Sandy's on the Phone Again"	
November	159	Johnny Howard Orchestra	"Bonnie and Clyde"/"Flapper Patrol"	
November	160	Flower Pot Men	"A Walk in the Sky"/"Am I Losing You?"	
November	161	The Moody Blues	"Nights in White Satin"/"Cities"	No. 19
November	162	The Societie	"Bird Has Flown"/"Breaking Down"	
November	163	Danny Williams	"Love Me"/"When You Were Mine"	
December	156	Cat Stevens	"Kitty"/"Blackness of the Night"	No. 47
December	164	Tintern Abbey	"Beeside"/"Vacuum Cleaner"	
December	165	Double Feature	"Handbags and Gladrags"/"Just Another Lonely Night"	
December	166	Jon Gunn	"If You Wish It"/"I Don't Want to Get Hung Up on You Babe"	
December	167	The Human Instinct	"A Day in My Mind's Mind"/"Death of the Seaside"	
December	168	–	–	not issued
December	169	The Crocheted Doughnut Ring	"Havana Anna"/"Happy Castle"	
December	170	Les Reed Orchestra	"Theme from Candice"/"The Last Waltz"	

=== 1968 ===
Month	Cat. No.	Artist	Title	Notes
January	171	Denny Laine	"Too Much in Love"/"Catherine's Wheel"	
January	172	Amen Corner	"Bend Me, Shape Me"/"Satisnek the Job's Worth"	No. 3
January	173	The Virgin Sleep	"Secret"/"Comes a Time"	
January	174	Warm Sounds	"Nite Is A-Comin'"/"Smeta Murgaty"	
February	175	Roberto Mann Singers	"Monya"/"My World Is You"	
February	176	Ten Years After	"Portable People"/"The Sounds"	
February	177	The Human Instinct	"Renaissance Fair"/"Pink Dawn"	
February	178	Cat Stevens	"Lovely City"/"Image of Hell"	
February	179	Whistling Jack Smith	"Ja-da"/"Sans Fairy Anne"	
March	180	The Crocheted Doughnut Ring	"Maxine's Parlour"/"Get Out Your Rock and Roll Shoes"	
March	181	Bernie & The Buzz Band	"Don't Knock It"/"When Something Is Wrong with My Baby"	
March	182	Honeybus	"I Can't Let Maggie Go"/"Tender Are the Ashes"	No. 8
April	183	The Flower Pot Men	"Man Without A Woman"/"You Can Never Be Wrong"	
April	184	Granny's Intentions	"Julie Don't Love Me Anymore"/"One Time Lovers"	
April	185	The Cuppa T	"Streatham Hippodrome"/"One Man Band"	
May	186	Focal Point	"Love You Forever"/"Sycamore Sid"	
May	187	World of Oz	"The Muffin Man"/"Peter's Birthday"	
May	190	Cats Eyes	"Smile Girl for Me"/"In a Fantasy World"	
May	191	–	–	not issued
May	192	Tony Osborne & His Three Brass Buttons	"Sunspot"/"Cornflake"	
May	193	Roberto Mann & His Orchestra	"Wonderful One"/"Moon Love"	
May	194	Timebox	"Beggin'"/"A Woman That's Waiting"	No. 38
June	188	Giles, Giles and Fripp	"One in a Million"/"Newly Weds"	
June	189	Whistling Jack Smith	"Only When I Larf"/"Early One Morning"	
June	195	The Flirtations	"Someone Out There"/"How Can You Tell Me?"	
June	196	The Moody Blues	"Voices in the Sky"/"Dr. Livingstone, I Presume"	No. 27
July	197	Amen Corner	"High in the Sky"/"Run Run Run"	No. 6
July	198	Friends	"Piccolo Man"/"Mythological Sunday"	
July	199	Danny Williams	"Everybody Needs Somebody"/"They Will Never Understand"	
July	200	Roberto Mann & His Orchestra	"Love Theme from Witchfinder General"/"Both Sides Now"	
July	202	Clyde McPhatter	"Only a Fool"/"Thank You Love"	
August	201	The Web	"Hatton Mill Morning"/"Conscience"	
August	203	London Balalaika Ensemble	"Kalinka"/"Remember, Remember"	
August	204	Roberto Mann Strings	"Are You Lonesome Tonight?"/"Never Goodbye"	
August	205	World of Oz	"King Croesus"/"Jack"	
August	206	"The Hawaiians"	"Tea for Two"/"A Taste of Honey"	
September	207	Honeybus	"Girl of Independent Means"/"How Long"	
September	208	The Anvil Flutes and Capricorn Voices	"April Showers"/"Jolie Gendarme"	
October	209	Cats Eyes	"I Thank You Marianne"/"Turn Around"	
October	210	Giles, Giles and Fripp	"Thursday Morning"/"Elephant Song"	
October	211	Cat Stevens	"Here Comes My Wife"/"It's a Super (Dupa) Life"	
October	212	Lionel Bart	"Isn't This Where We Came In?"/"May a Man Be Merry?"	
October	213	The Moody Blues	"Ride My See-Saw"/"A Simple Game"	No. 42
October	214	Granny's Intentions	"Never an Everyday Thing"/"Hilda the Bilda"	
November	215	The Doughnut Ring	"Dance Around Julie"/"The Bandit"	
November	216	The Flirtations	"Nothing but a Heartache"/"Christmas Time Is Here Again"	
November	217	The Web with John L. Watson	"Baby Won't You Leave Me Alone"/"McVernon Street"	
November	218	Roberto Mann Orchestra with Chorus	"Moonlight Clair de Lune"/"Snow in Autumn"	
November	219	Timebox	"Girl Don't Make Me Wait"/"Gone Is the Sad Man"	
November	220	Curiosity Shoppe	"Baby I Need You"/"So Sad"	
November	221	Ten Years After	"Hear Me Calling"/"I'm Going Home"	

=== 1969 ===
Month	Cat. No.	Artist	Title	Notes
January	222	Wayne Faro & His Schmaltz Band	"There's Still Time"/"Give It Time"	
January	223	Clyde McPhatter	"Baby, You've Got It"/"Baby I could Be So Good at Loving You"	
January	224	John Surman	"Obeah Wedding"/"Don't Stop the Carnival"	
January	225	Neil McArthur	"She's Not There"/"World of Glass"	No. 34
January	226	The Youth	"Meadow of My Love"/"Love Me or Leave Me"	
January	227	Denny Laine	"Say You Don't Mind"/"Ask the People"	
January	228	Amen Corner	"The World of Broken Hearts"/"Gin House Blues"	
January	229	–	–	not issued
January	230	Roberto Mann Orchestra & Chorus	"Albatross"/"My Magic Dream"	
February	231	U.K. Jones	"Let Me Tell Ya"/"And the Rains Came Down"	
February	232	Grisby Dyke	"The Adventures of Miss Rosemary La Page"/"Mary Ann She"	
February	233	World of Oz	"Willow's Harp"/"Like a Tear"	
February	234	Mike Westbrook	"A Life of Its Own"/"Can't Get It Out of My Mind"	
February	235	Donnie Elbert	"Without You"/"Baby Please Come Home"	
February	236	Raymonde's Magic Organ	"Yellow Submarine"/"Winchester Cathedral"	
February	237	Raymonde's Magic Organ	"Blue"/"Brown Eyes"	
February	238	Raymonde's Magic Organ	"Please Don't Talk About Me When I'm Gone"/"You Must Have Been a Beautiful Baby"	
February	239	Raymonde's Magic Organ	"Oh! Johnny, Oh! Johnny, Oh!"/"Heartaches"	
February	240	Raymonde's Magic Organ	"Cry"/"Tennessee Waltz"	
February	241	Raymonde's Magic Organ	"These Boots Are Made for Walking"/"Green Green Grass of Home"	
March	242	East of Eden	"Northern Hemisphere"/"Communion"	
March	243	Touch	"Miss Teach"/"We Feel Fine"	
March	244	Les Reed/Les Reed Orchestra	"Don't Linger With Your Finger on the Trigger"/"Big Drum"	
March	245	Kenny Everett	"Nice Time"/"And Now for a Little Train Number"	
March	246	Timebox	"Baked Jam Roll in Your Eye"/"Poor Little Heartbreaker"	
March	248	The Flower Pot Men	"In A Moment of Madness"/"Young Birds Fly"	
April	247	The Moody Blues	"Never Comes the Day"/"So Deep Within You"	
April	249	Roberto Mann Orchestra & Chorus	Theme from the Film Baby Love / "Serenade to Summer"	
April	250	Keef Hartley	"Leave It 'Til the Morning"/"Just to Cry"	
April	251	Cats Eyes	"Where Is She Now?"/"Tom Drum"	
April	252	The Flirtations	"What's Good About Goodbye My Love?"/"Once I Had a Love"	
May	253	The Web	"Monday to Friday"/"Harold Dubbleyew"	
May	254	Honeybus	"She Sold Blackpool Rock"/"Would You Believe"	
May	255	–	–	not issued
May	256	John Cameron Quartet	"Trouble Maker"/"Off Centre"	
June	257	The Shepperton Flames	"Take Me for What I Am"/"Goodbye"	
June	258	The March Hare	"Have We Got News For You"/"I Could Make It There With You"	
June	259	The Alan Bown Set	"Still As Stone"/"Wrong Idea"	
June	260	Cat Stevens	"Where Are You"/"The View from the Top"	
June	261	Tam White	"That Old Sweet Roll"/"Don't Make Promises"	
June	262	Neil MacArthur	"Don't Try to Explain"/"Without Her"	
June	263	Alan Price	"The Trimdon Grange Explosion"/"Falling in Love Again"	
June	264	The Fantastics	"Face to Face with Heartache"/"This Must Be My Rainy Day"	
July	265	R.J. Hightower	"God Is Love"/"Sister Mimi"	
July	266	Johnny Almond Music Machine	"Solar Level"/"To R.K."	
August	268	Love Children	"Easy Squeezy"/"Every Little Step"	
August	269	Egg	"Seven Is a Jolly Good Time"/"You Are All Princes"	
September	267	Garden Odyssey Enterprise	"Sad and Lonely"/"Sky Pilot"	
September	270	Bulldog Breed	"Portcullis Gate"/"Halo in My Hair"	
September	272	The Incrowd	"Where in the World"/"I Can Make Love to You"	
October	271	Timebox	"Yellow Van"/"You've Got the Chance"	
October	273	The Keef Hartley Band	"Waiting Around"/"Not Foolish, Not Wise"	
October	274	Margo	"The Spark That Lights the Flame"/"Left Over Love"	
October	275	Neil MacArthur	"It's Not Easy"/"12.29"	
October	276	Brotherhood of Man	"Love One Another"/"A Little Bit of Heaven"	
October	277	Kelly	"Mary Mary"/"Reverend Richard Bailey"	
October	278	The Alan Bown Set	"Gypsy Girl"/"All I Can"	
November	279	Kathe Green	"If I Thought You'd Ever Change Your Mind"/"Primrose Hill"	

=== 1970 ===
Month	Cat. No.	Artist	Title	Notes
January	280	White Plains	"My Baby Loves Lovin'"/"Show Me Your Hand"	No. 9
January	281	The Flirtations	"Keep on Searching"/"Moma I'm Coming Home"	
January	282	Music Motor	"Happy"/"Where Am I Going?"	
January	283	The Fantastics	"Waiting Round for Heartaches"/"Ask the Lonely"	
January	284	Brotherhood of Man	"United We Stand"/"Say a Prayer"	No. 10
February	285	John L. Watson	"A Mother's Love"/"Might As Well Be Gone"	
February	286	Mike Westbrook Concert Band	"Hooray"/"Requiem"	
February	287	The Naked Truth	"Two Little Rooms"/"Rag Doll Boy"	
February	288	Frijid Pink	"The House of the Rising Sun"/"Drivin' Blues"	No. 4
March	289	Honeybus	"Story"/"The Night to Choose"	
March	290	Bill Nile & His Goodtime Band	"I Try Not to Laugh"/"Nobody Knows The Trouble I've Seen"	
April	291	White Plains	"I've Got You on My Mind"/"Today I Killed a Man I Didn't Know"	No. 17
April	292	Currant Kraze	"Lady Pearl"/"Breaking the Heart of a Good Man"	
April	293	Granny's Intentions	"Take Me Back"/"Maybe"	
May	294	Columbus	"E'vrybody Knows the U.S. Marshal"/"So Tired"	
May	295	The Flirtations	"Can't Stop Loving You"/"Everybody Needs Somebody"	
May	296	Simon, Plug & Grimes	"Is This a Dream"/"I'm Going Home"	
May	297	East of Eden	"Jig-a-Jig"/"Marcus Junior"	No. 7
June	298	Brotherhood of Man	"Where Are You Going to My Love?"/"Living in the Land of Love"	No. 22
June	299	Ten Years After	"Love Like a Man" (studio)/"Love Like a Man" (live)	No. 10
June	300 301 302	–	–	not issued
June	303	Love Children	"Paper Chase"/"My Turkey Snuffed It"	
June	304	Pacific Drift	"Water Woman"/"Yes You Do"	
July	305	Pebbles	"Stand Up and Be Counted"/"May in the Morning"	
July	306	Galliard	"I Wrapped Her in Ribbons"/"Hermit and the Knight"	
July	307	Tontine	"A Strange Way to Love"/"I Don't Look Back"	
July	309	Frijid Pink	"Sing a Song of Freedom"/"End of the Line"	
July	310	Ten Years After	"Love Like a Man" (studio)/"Love Like a Man" (live)	Reissue of DMS 299
August	308	Walrus	"Who Can I Trust?"/"Tomorrow Never Comes"	
August	311	Mike Westbrook Concert Orchestra with Norma Winstone	"Original Peter"/"Magic Garden"	
August	312	White Plains	"Lovin' You Baby"/"Noises in My Head"	
August	313	Someone's Band	"A Story"/"Give It to You"	
October	314	Mucky Duck	"Jefferson"/"Psycho's on the Run"	
October	315	White Plains with Pete Nelson	"Julie Do Ya Love Me"/"I Need Your Everlasting Love"	No. 8
November	316	Keef Hartley Band	"Roundabout (Part 1)"/"Roundabout (Part 2)"	
November	317	Brotherhood of Man	"This Boy"/"You Can Depend on Me"	
December	318	Sue and Sunny	"Ain't That Tellin' You People"/"Didn't I Blow Your Mind This Time"	
December	319	Johnny Goodison	"One Mistake"/"A Little Understanding"	
December	320	Patricia Cahill	"Little Altar Boy"/"Rain"	
December	321	Frijid Pink	"Heartbreak Hotel"/"By Bye Blues"	

=== 1971 ===
Month	Cat. No.	Artist	Title	Notes
January	322	Brimstone	"Keyhole Jake"/"The Monkey Song"	
January	323	Walrus	"Never Let My Body Touch the Ground"/"Why?"	
February	324	Patricia Cahill	"Colm Ban"/"Eighteen"	
February	325	White Plains	"Every Little Move She Makes"/"Carolina's Comin'"	
February	326	–	–	not issued
March	327	Brotherhood of Man	"Reach Out Your Hand"/"A Better Tomorrow"	
April	328	Sue and Sunny	"Freedom"/"Break Up"	
April	329	The Flirtations	"Give Me Love"/"This Must Be The End of the Line"	
April	330	–	–	not issued
April	331	Megaton	"Out of Your Own Little World"/"Niagara"	
May	332	Frijid Pink	"Music for the People"/"Sloony"	
May	333	White Plains	"When You Are a King"/"The World Gets Better With Love"	No. 13
May	334	The Fantastics	"For Old Times Sake"/"Exodus Main Theme"	
May	335	Brotherhood of Man	"You and I"/"Sing in the Sunshine"	
June	336	Frijid Pink	"We're Gonna Be There (When Johnny Comes Marching Home)"/"Shorty Kline"	
August	337	Miller Anderson	"Bright City"/"Another Time, Another Place"	
August	338	East of Eden	"Ramadhan"/"In the Snow for a Blow"/"Better Git It in Your Soul (Part III)"/"Have to Whack It Up"	
August	339	Ultrafox	"Nine by Nine"/"Stomping at Decca"	
August	340	White Plains	"Gonna Miss Her Mississippi"/"I'll Go Blind"	
September	341	Brotherhood of Man	"California Sunday Morning"/"Do Your Thing"	
September	343	Grapefruit	"Sha- Sha"/"Universal Party"	
October	342	Vehicle	"Hey Mr Organ Grinder"/"Cloudy Days"	
October	344	Junior Campbell	"Goodbye Baby Jane"/"If I Call Your Name"	
November	345	Haffy's Whiskey Sour	"Shot in the Head"/"By Bye Bluebird"	
November	346	People	"In Ancient Times"/"Glastonbury"	
December	347	Frijid Pink	"Lost Son"/"I Love Her"	

=== 1972 ===
Month	Cat. No.	Artist	Title	Notes
January	348	White Plains	"I Can't Stop"/"Julie Anne"	
January	349	Arthur Greenslade	"Flirt"/"Rainy Day Love"	
January	351	The Flirtations	"Need Your Loving"/"I Wanna Be There"	
February	350	Jake	"And in the Morning"/"You and Me"	
February	352	Lazy Lingo	"1st Door, 2nd Floor"/"Race Against Time"	
March	353	Laurie Dryden	"The Spirit of Joe Hill"/"Half of Me"	
March	354	Matthew's Revelation	"Jesus Come Back"/"He Will Come Again"	
March	355	Sue and Sunny	"I'm Gonna Make You Love Me"/"High on the Thought of You"	
March	357	Mellow Candle	"Dan the Wing"/"Silversong"	
April	356	The Clan	"Pretty Belinda"/"Ode to Karen"	
April	358	Jerusalem	"Kamikazi Moth"/"Frustration"	
July	359	Hollywood Freeway	"I've Been Moved"/"Cool Calamares"	
August	360	Colin Areety	"Poco Joe"/"To Give All Your Love Away"	
August	361	Brotherhood of Man	"Say a Prayer"/"Follow Me"	
September	362	Socrates	"Eatin' Momma's Cookin'"/"Dearest Agnes"	
September	363	Limelight	"Baby Don't Get Hooked on Me"/"I'll See You on Sunday"	
September	364	Junior Campbell	"Hallelujah Freedom"/"Alright With Me"	No. 10
October	365	White Plains	"Dad You Saved The World"/"Beachcomber"	
October	366	Brotherhood of Man	"Rock Me Baby"/"Hang On"	unreleased
October	367	Hoagy Pogey	"Don't Ya Know"/"Why Don't You Go Away"	
October	368	Pussy	"Feline Woman"/"Ska Child"	
October	369	–	–	not issued

=== 1973 ===
Month	Cat. No.	Artist	Title	Notes
January	370	Colin Areety	"Holy Cow"/"I Can't Do It for You"	
January	371	White Plains	"Step into a Dream"/"Look to See"	No. 21
January	372	Torry Canyon	"I Believe in Music"/"Getting Better All the Time"	
February	373	Lee Sheriden	"Sweetest Tasting Candy Sugar"/"Big Louis' Gun"	
February	374	Hoagy Pogey	"Falling in Love With You-Hoo-Hoo-Hoo"/"Nothing Better"	
February	375	Rococo	"Ultrastar"/"Wildfire"	
March	376	Streak	"Bang Bang Bullet"/"Black Jack Man"	
March	377	Chris Youlden	"Nowhere Road"/"Standing on the Corner"	
March	378	Wolf	"Wolf"/"Spring Fever"	
March	379	Hemlock	"Mr. Horizontal"/"Beggar Man"	
March	380	Keef Hartley Band	"Dance to the Music"/"You and Me"	
March	381	Chicken Shack	"As Time Goes Passing By"/"Poor Boy"	
April	382	Boss	"Mony Mony"/"Live Together"	
April	383	Colin Areety	"I Don't Want to Be Right"/"One Night Affair"	
April	384	Fresh Meat	"Never Mind the Money"/"Candy Eyes"	
April	385	Brotherhood of Man	"Happy Ever After"/"We Can Make It"	
April	386	Stavely Makepeace	"Cajun Band"/"Memories of Your Love"	
April	387	Junior Campbell	"Sweet Illusion"/"Ode to Karen"	No. 15
April	389	Hoagy Pogey	"Wedding of the Year"/"Wham Zam"	
May	388	White Plains	"Does Anybody Know Where My Baby Is"/"Just for a Change"	
May	390	Howard Lee	"Love Coming My Way"/"Show Me Freedom"	
June	391	Principal Edwards	"Captain Lifeboy"/"Nothing"	
June	392	Northeast	"A Ticket for the Game"/"Jack the Lad"	
July	393	Brotherhood of Man	"Our World of Love"/"Maybe the Morning"	
July	394	Them	"Baby, Please Don't Go"/"Gloria"	
July	396	Chicken Shack	"You Know You Could Be Right"/"The Loser"	
August	395	Wolf	"A Bunch of Fives"/"Five in the Morning"	
August	397	Big Foot	"Lost in the Mountains"/"Double Standards"	
August	398	Principal Edwards	"Weekdaze"/"The Whizzmore Kid"	
August	399	Kit Russell	"Pepper's Last Stand"/"Shuffle Back"	
September	400	Them	"Here Comes the Night"/"All for Myself"	
October	401	Wolf	"Two Sisters"/"Go Down"	
October	402	Keith West	"Riding for a Fall"/"Days About to Rain"	
October	403	Junior Campbell	"Help Your Fellow Man"/"Pretty Belinda"	
October	404	Brotherhood of Man	"United We Stand"/"Follow Me"	
November	405	White Plains	"Julie Anne"/"Sunny Honey Girl"	
November	406	Cat Stevens	"I Love My Dog"/"Matthew and Son"	Reissue of two 1966 tracks

=== 1974 ===
Month	Cat. No.	Artist	Title	Notes
February	407	Michael Chapman	"The Banjo Song"/"Dumplings"	
February	408	Iron Virgin	"Jet"/"Midnight Hitcher"	
February	409	Mike Hart	"Son Son"/"Band News Man"	
February	410	Keith West	"Havin' Someone"/"Know There's No Livin' Without You"	
March	411	Whistling Jack Smith	"The Battle of Waterloo (Love Theme)"/"No Time for Punting"	
April	412	Ferret	"Hudson Bay"/"Henry's Song"	
May	413	Robert E. Lee	"One Man Band"/"Sunshine"	
May	415	White Plains	"Ecstasy"/"A Simple Man"	
June	414	Junior Campbell	"Sweet Lady Love"/"If I Could Believe You Darlin'"	
June	416	Iron Virgin	"Rebels Rule"/"Ain't No Clown"	
July	417	Shy	"Disney Girls"/"The Time That I Love You the Most"	
September	418	Sweet Reason	"Hundred Thousand Dollar"/"How I Wish You Needed Me"	
September	419	Cameleon	"Run May Run"/"I Go Bananas"	
September	420	Vineyard	"Charlemaine"/"Myla"	
October	421	Junior Campbell	"Ol' Virginia"/"Willie Sings The Blues"	
October	422	Neil Harrison	"Eyes in the Back of My Head"/"The Busker"	
October	423	Stavely Makepeace	"Runaround Sue"/"There's a Wall Between Us"	
November	424	Beano	"Candy Bean"/"Rock and Roll Gonna Save My Soul"	

=== 1975 ===
Month	Cat. No.	Artist	Title	Notes
February	425	Jimmy Scott	"We All Need a Hero"/"Madeline"	
March	426	Curved Air	"Back Street Luv"/"It Happened Today"	
April	427	Beano	"Little Cinderella"/"Bye and Bye"	

=== 1977 ===
Month	Cat. No.	Artist	Title	Notes
January	428	Justin Hayward	"One Lonely Room"/"Songwriter"	
April	429	Justin Hayward	"Country Girl"/"Doin' Time"	
July	430	Justin Hayward	"Stage Door"/"Lay It on Me"	

=== 1979 ===
Month	Cat. No.	Artist	Title	Notes
September	431	The Donkeys	"What I Want"/"Four Letters"	
November	432	Patrick D. Martin	"I Like 'Lectric Motors"/"Time"	

=== 1980 ===
Month	Cat. No.	Artist	Title	Notes
March	433	Patrick D. Martin	"Luci 'Lectric"/"I Like 'Lectric Motors"/"Mutant"	
May	BUM 1	Splodgenessabounds	"Simon Templar"/"Michael Booth's Talking Bum"/"Two Pints of Lager"	No. 7
July	DET R 1	The Mo-dettes	"Paint It Black"/"Bitta Truth"	No. 42
August	ROLF 1	Splodgenessabounds	"Two Little Boys"/"Horse"/"Sox"/"Butterfly"	No. 26
December	436	Jane Kennaway and Strange Behaviour	"IOU"/"Take Me Away"	No. 65

=== 1981–1996 ===
Month/Year	Cat. No.	Artist	Title	Notes
March 1981	437	B-Movie	"Remembrance Day"/"Institution Walls"	No. 61
April 1981	DMDJ 440	The Flatbackers	"Serenade of Love"/"Try a Little Harder"	promo only
July 1981	444	Jane Kennaway	"Year 2000"/"On 84th Street"	
April 1982	NANA 1	Bananarama and Fun Boy Three	"Really Saying Something"/"Give US Back Our Cheap Fares"	No. 5
November 1990	KINKY 1	Patrick Macnee & Honor Blackman	"Kinky Boots"/"Let's Keep It Friendly"	No. 5
1996	INFLDJ 1	Pete Moore/Roland Shaw & His Orchestra	"Catwalk"/"Let the Love Come Through"	promo only
