= I Have No Cannons That Roar =

2000 compilation album by various artists, led by Cat Stevens

Compilation album by Yusuf Islam
- Released: 2 May 2000
- Label: Jamal Records

Yusuf Islam chronology
| Prayers of the Last Prophet (1999) | I Have No Cannons That Roar (2000) | A Is for Allah (2000) |

I Have No Cannons That Roar is a compilation album by various artists, and headed by Yusuf Islam (better known under his stage name Cat Stevens), released on 2 May 2000 through Jamal Records. It is dedicated to the memory of Irfan Ljubijankić, a musician and politician who was killed towards the end of the Bosnian War.

On 28 May 1995, the helicopter he was flying in on a mercy mission was shot down by a Serb rocket. He was returning from a visit to his home town of Bihać, and at that time the front line was against the attacking forces. A few months earlier in his role as the Foreign Minister of Bosnia, he met Yusuf on a trip to London, and gave him a cassette of a song he had written and recorded at home, titled "I Have No Cannons That Roar". His hope was that Yusuf would use it in some way to help the Bosnian cause. The song was subsequently translated into English, recorded by Dino Merlin, and put in the album, along with other songs famous in Bosnia during the war.

Some of the songs are included in the album without any changes to them, while others were re-recorded in London and Stuttgart. Two new songs were added, specially written for the album by Stevens, "The Little Ones" and "Mother, Father, Sister, Brother". The album ends with a 50-second spoken word piece by Stevens expressing hope that Bosnia would recover from the war.

== Track listing ==
1. "Mother, Father, Sister Brother" (Abd al-Lateef Whiteman)
2. "When Adhans are Called" (Senad Podojak)
3. "The Blossoms Blown" (Burhan Saban)
4. "Where are Makkah And Madina" (Aziz Alili)
5. "Spring Of Tasnim" (Senad Podojak)
6. "Hey Homeland" (Aziz Alili)
7. "Allah is Enough For Me" (Aziz Alili)
8. "Last Flight" (Abd Al-Alteef Whiteman)
9. "I Have No Cannons That Roar" (Dino Merlin)
10. "The Little Ones" (Yusuf Islam)
11. "I Am A Son Of Yours" (Senad Podojak)
12. "Summary"
