= Yoriyos Adamos =

British musician, songwriter, and manager (1985-)

Muhammad Yusuf Islam / Yoriyos Adamos
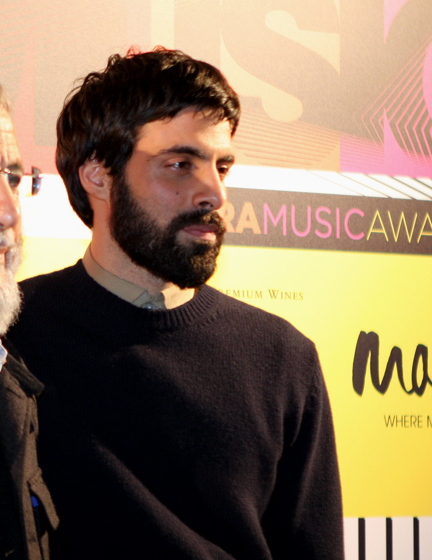
- Yoriyos in 2012

Background information
- Born: Muhammad Yusuf Islam; 1 April 1985 (age 41); United Kingdom
- Genre: Folk · world · country
- Occupation: Singer-songwriter · musician · manager
- Works: Bury My Heart at Wounded Knee · The Way They Lush
- Years active: 2007–present
- Label: Rarechords Ltd. · Lost Marbles
- Member of: Noxshi

Yoriyos Adamos (born Muhammad Yusuf Islam; 1 April 1985) is a British singer-songwriter and musician. He is the son and manager of Yusuf Islam, also known as Cat Stevens. His debut and sole solo album was Bury My Heart at Wounded Knee, released in late 2007. Since then, he has worked with the band Noxshi and become his father's manager. Yoriyos is frequently credited with Stevens's 2006 return to pop music, after a 28-year hiatus. Stevens stated that being in close proximity to his son's musical instruments inspired him to start playing again.

== Life and career ==
=== Early life (1985–2006) ===
Yoriyos was born with the name Muhammad Yusuf Islam on 1 April 1985 in the United Kingdom, to Yusuf Islam (1948-) and Fauzia Mubarak Ali (1958-). He is an only son, but has four sisters.

==== Inspiring his father's musical reemergence ====
In 2002, while living in London during his college years, Muhammad purchased a black Yamaha guitar and snuck it into a Dubai family vacation. He had been interested in music for years, even once bringing a Metallica cassette with him on a trip to Kosovo.

His father, Yusuf Islam, had been a successful British singer-songwriter before leaving the industry after converting to Islam. He had not played music for over two decades, but upon discovering the guitar, Yusuf picked it up and began playing a few chords. Muhammad's younger sister Aminah requested "The Laughing Apple", a song from Yusuf's 1967 album New Masters. This would be the first time they heard their father sing and play at the same time. Muhammad later recalled: "My guitar wasn’t in my room that night. He’d taken it. The next day, he’d written a song. That’s how quick it was.” Yusuf later taught Muhammad how to play the guitar, and would return to pop music four years later with the album An Other Cup, for which Muhammad created the cover art.

=== 2007–present: Musical career as "Yoriyos" ===
==== 2007: "The Pied Piper" and Bury My Heart at Wounded Knee ====
Muhammad also began working on music around this time, recording a six-track demo in 2004. He adopted the name "Yoriyos Adamos" to conceal his identity as "the son of Cat Stevens". "Yoriyos" was the Anglicized spelling of Georgiou, the old family surname.

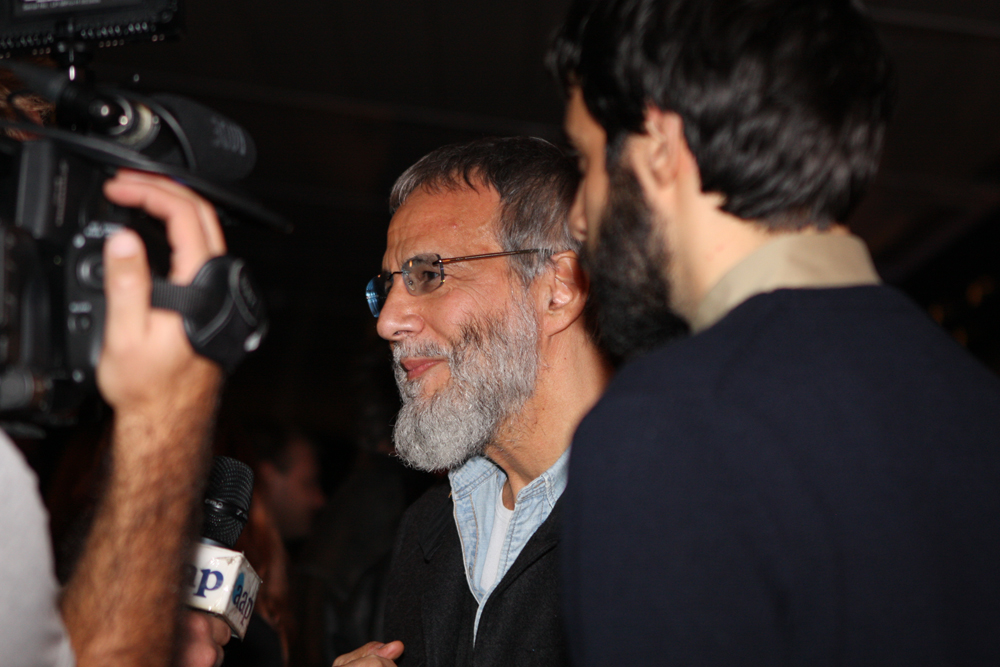
Yoriyos and Yusuf at the 2012 APRA Music Awards in Sydney.

The album was titled Bury My Heart at Wounded Knee, named after Dee Brown's 1970 book of the same name on Native Americans. Yoriyos released the album with his own label Rarechords Ltd on 27 November 2007. A promo single for the album, "The Pied Piper", was released that same year.

On the album, ten out of the eleven tracks are written by Yoriyos himself, the remaining track is a cover of his father's song "In the End".

Zahed Amanullah, associate editor of altmuslim.com, praised the album, calling it "gorgeous" and "far more elliptical and evocative than his father’s recent work, and yet sedate and pensive as well", suggesting Yoriyos's youth and talent "may still chart a course for even brighter things to come." Jenni Cole of MusicOMH noted that "at times his music seems lost in a forgotten time warp of the 70s – and the 1870s at that", however, she praised Yoriyos's vocals "as clear as a Montana river", and concluded that the album's flaws "[pale] into insignificance next to the music’s plus points." Yusuf was "really impressed" by the album and its theme, as well as his son's musical talent, both in singing and songwriting. However, he recalled that upon its release it received frequent comparisons to Yusuf's own music.

A follow-up album had been written, but was never released.

==== Creating and touring with "Noxshi" ====
By 2008, Yoriyos had formed the rock band Noxshi with guitarist Hallam Kite, preferring a band to a solo act. Other band members included Alexander Gabay (bass), Ben Steer (keys), and Erik Fastern (drums). On their website, their music was described as "music designed to be infectious on the level of the collective harmonic brainframe".

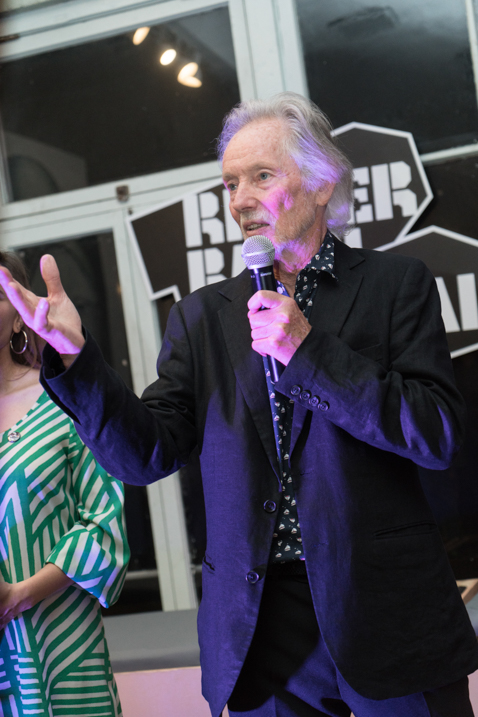
German artist Klaus Voormann created the cover art for Noxshi's debut album The Way They Lush.

Two extended plays, Nine Point Circle and Terra, were released in 2009, followed by a single, "Swan"/"Cosmogonies". Their debut album The Way They Lush was expected to release in September 2010, but was delayed to 8 May 2011. The Way They Lush's album cover was illustrated by German artist Klaus Voormann. Noxshi described the album as "vast and ambitious".

Noxshi also contributed to Yusuf's 2009 tribute track for American pop singer Michael Jackson, entitled "He's Gone".

After spending 2009 performing locally in London, the next year Noxshi expanded their touring to Australia to promote their new album, joining Yoriyos's father on tour. For the shows with Yusuf, Noxshi presented "a primarily Blues Rock set reminiscent of 1968." Yoriyos wore a gas mask during some concerts, while the other band members wore masks, dresses, and white one-pieces.

Larry Heath of The AU Review complimented the band after viewing a concert in Sydney, Australia, calling them "superb" and the performance "tight, original and at times surprising", though mentioned the interaction with the audience was slightly "flat".

=== Working with his father ===
Since Yusuf's return to pop music in 2006, Yoriyos has been credited with assistance in creating the design for his album covers on albums through An Other Cup to his latest, King of a Land as well as several box sets and remasters.

Yoriyos also works as Yusuf's manager. The exact date he took the job is not publicly available, however a 2019 Billboard article mentions "Yusuf continues to be managed by Yoriyos Adamos at Catch Bull Management." During the COVID lockdown, Yoriyos supervised virtual interviews for him. He also worked with UMPG (Universal Music Publishing Group) to secure a contract for Yusuf in 2024.

== Discography ==
=== Albums and extended plays ===
==== Solo ====
- 2007: Bury My Heart at Wounded Knee

==== With Noxshi ====
- 2009: Nine Point Circle (EP)
- 2009: Terra (EP)
- 2011: The Way They Lush

=== Singles ===
==== Solo ====
- 2007: "The Pied Piper"

==== With Noxshi ====
- 2009: "Swan"/"Cosmogonies"
