= Roadsinger =

Studio album by Yusuf
- Released: 1 May 2009
- Recorded: 2008
- Genre: Folk rock
- Length: 31:37
- Label: Ya; Island (UK/Europe); UM^{e} (US/Canada)
- Producer: Yusuf, Martin Terefe

Yusuf chronology
An Other Cup (2006)	Roadsinger (2009)	Tell 'Em I'm Gone (2014)

Professional ratings
Review scores
Source	Rating
AllMusic	3.5/5 stars
Mojo	4/5 stars
Rolling Stone	3/5 stars
ZME Music	10/10 stars

Roadsinger is the thirteenth studio album by Yusuf (formerly known as Yusuf Islam and as Cat Stevens). Roadsinger is Yusuf's second mainstream release since his return to music. The album made its debut on the US Billboard 200 at position No. 41 and on the UK Albums Chart at No. 10.

== History ==
The album was released by Island Records in the UK—his first for the label since Back to Earth. It was released in the US by Universal's reissue label UM^{e}.

Alun Davies, Yusuf's long-time musical associate, does not feature on the album.

== Cover art ==
On the album cover, the singer is credited as "Yusuf" with a promotional sticker identifying him also as "Cat Stevens".

== Track listing ==
All songs are written by Yusuf.

1. "Welcome Home" – 4:23
2. "Thinking 'Bout You" – 2:31
3. "Everytime I Dream" – 3:09
4. "The Rain" – 3:26
5. "World o' Darkness" – 2:23
6. "Be What You Must" – 3:25
7. "This Glass World" – 2:02
8. "Roadsinger" – 4:09
9. "All Kinds of Roses" – 2:38
10. "Dream On (Until...)" – 1:56
11. "Shamsia" – 1:29
12. "Boots and Sand" (iTunes bonus track, featuring Paul McCartney and Dolly Parton)
13. "Peace Train Blues" (iTunes bonus track)

== Charts ==
Chart (2009)	Peak position
Australian Albums (ARIA)	35
Austrian Albums (Ö3 Austria)	10
Belgian Albums (Ultratop Flanders)	86
Dutch Albums (Album Top 100)	71
French Albums (SNEP)	88
German Albums (Offizielle Top 100)	9
Italian Albums (FIMI)	31
New Zealand Albums (RMNZ)	22
Swedish Albums (Sverigetopplistan)	41
Swiss Albums (Schweizer Hitparade)	43
UK Albums (Official Charts)	10
US Billboard 200	41
