= Senad Podojak =

Bosnian Qur'an reciter (born 1966)

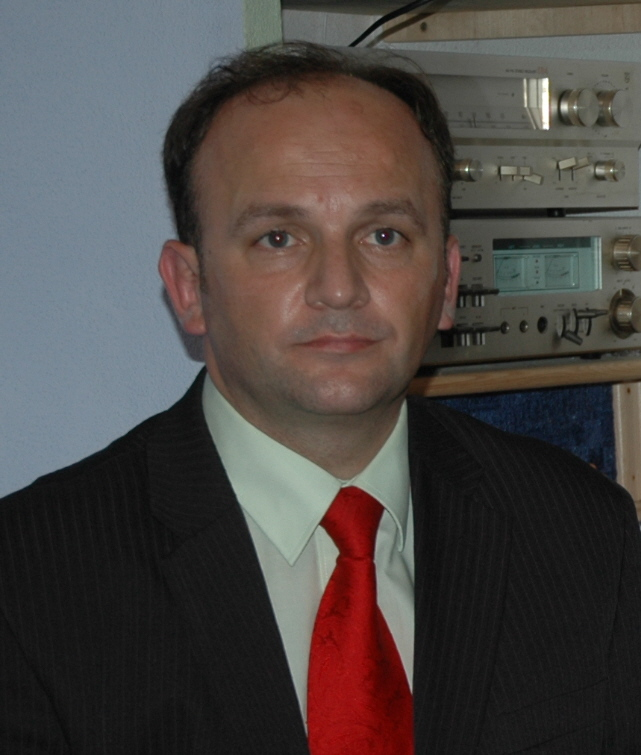
Senad Podojak

Hafiz Senad Podojak (born 31 May 1966 in Zenica, Bosnia and Herzegovina) is a Bosnian imam and qari, currently living in Austria.

== Biography ==
Podojak enrolled in the Gazi Husrev-beg Madrasa in 1981, which he successfully completed in 1985. In the second grade of the madrasa, he was appointed muezzin of the Gazi Husrev-beg Mosque, a position he held until 1989. At the same time, he became an active member of the Gazi Husrev-beg Madrasa choir until 1989. He is internationally known as a qari.

Podojak participated at the International Competition for Quran recitation in Mecca in 1987, where he finished in 5th place. In Tehran, Podojak reached 4th place and 1st place in Vienna. In the 90s, he recorded an album of nashids about the Bosnian War with Yusuf Islam, Dino Merlin and Aziz Alili.

Podojak is chairman of the Islamic Community in Austria in Wels. Since 2005, he has served as a specialist inspector for religious education in Islamic religion at the Pedagogical Institute.

Podojak lives and works in Wels. He is married and has two children.
