= Footsteps in the Light =

Compilation album by Yusuf Islam
- Released: 18 December 2006
- Genre: Nasheed, spoken word, prayer
- Label: Jamal Records

Yusuf Islam chronology
Indian Ocean (2005)	Footsteps in the Light (2006)	I Look, I See 2 (2008)

Footsteps in the Light is a compilation album of songs by Yusuf Islam (formerly known as Cat Stevens) spanning the years from 1981 to 2004 after his conversion to Islam. It shows a major shift in his musical focus, and demonstrates Yusuf Islam's journey from that of a pop star to a Muslim performer, who began a slow return to recording music, beginning with a song written for his daughter Hasannah, "A is for Allah", after finding that few children's songs were available not just to entertain, but to acquaint young people with Islamic teachings. During this period, Yusuf employed only the use of voice and drums in recording these songs, due to a lack of consensus among the Islamic community regarding whether the use of musical instruments were permitted. Other than the songs written, Yusuf recorded nasheeds, spoken word, and Muslim prayers, as with the traditional call to prayer, the Aḏhān. Yusuf added his own touches to a very old Middle Eastern folk song, Tala'al Badru Alayna, adding a Western folk sound with melody and harmonics, and translating some of the verses into English from the original Arabic, so that the song might be understood in more than one language.

In addition to the newer songs, Yusuf Islam added some of his popular hits from the 1970s, when he was a singer-songwriter in the folk rock genre. The songs from that time are "Peace Train", "Wild World", and "The Wind".

The album includes a 24-page song booklet of lyrics along with comments from Yusuf about each track.

== Track listing ==
1. "The Wind"
2. "The White Moon (featuring Ben Ammi)"
3. "If You Ask Me
4. "I Look, I See"
5. "Tala'al Badru 'Alayna"
6. "Seal of the Prophets"
7. "Wild World (Bana, Bana)"
8. "Angel of War"
9. "In Nilta"
10. "Salli Ala Muhammad"
11. "God is the Light"
12. "Peace Train"
13. "A is for Allah"
14. "The Adhan (Call to Prayer)"
