= King of a Land =

2023 studio album by Yusuf / Cat Stevens

Studio album by Yusuf / Cat Stevens
- Released: 16 June 2023
- Recorded: 2011–2022
- Studios: Air Lyndhurst Studios, London, England, United Kingdom (orchestra); Angel Studios, London, England, United Kingdom; Dubville, Dubai, United Arab Emirates; F.P.S.H.O.T., Henley-upon-Thames, England, United Kingdom; La Fabrique, Provence, France; Hansa Studios, Berlin, Germany; ICP Studios, Brussels, Belgium.
- Genres: Children's; religious
- Length: 43:16
- Labels: BMG; Cat-O-Log; Dark Horse
- Producer: Paul Samwell-Smith

Yusuf / Cat Stevens chronology
Tea for the Tillerman 2 (2020)	King of a Land (2023)	On the Road to Findout: Greatest Hits (2025)

Singles from King of a Land
- 1. "Take the World Apart" Released: 15 March 2023; 2. "King of a Land" Released: 25 April 2023; 3. "All Nights, All Days" Released: 17 May 2023

King of a Land is the seventeenth studio album from British singer-songwriter Yusuf / Cat Stevens, released on 16 June 2023 by BMG Rights Management / Dark Horse Records. The recording featured children's music and religious music influences, and received positive reviews from critics.

== Recording and release ==
Stevens worked on the album for over a decade before releasing the debut single "Take the World Apart" on 15 March 2023. The title track "King of a Land" followed as a single on 25 April. On the same day, he addressed King Charles III ahead of his coronation with a 10-point list entitled Manifesto for a Good King. The songs have a theme of peace, which Stevens considers a culminating theme of his career. There were followed by a music video for "All Nights, All Days", released on 17 May 2023, that references Stevens' work for the soundtrack to Harold and Maude.

== Critical reception ==
King of a Land received positive reviews from critics noted at review aggregator Metacritic. It has a weighted average score of 82 out of 100, based on four reviews.

Writing for The Arts Desk, Thomas H Green rated this release three out of five stars, writing that the music "combines his apparently effortless immediacy at acoustic guitar songwriting with an orchestrated opulence that sometimes pushes the sound towards the realms of musical theatre" and praises "the utopian Sixties-ish positivity, the desire for better, and the crisp, bright-eyed songwriting", but cautions that listeners' response to the album will "likely be define[d] [by how] they feel about his repeated and passionate belief in God, which permeates everything". In The Daily Telegraph, James Hill gave King of a Land 4 out of 5 stars, stating that it "is unlikely to bring in legions of new fans" and criticizing the "monothematic" lyrics, but praising it for being "a lushly beautiful album from one of pop's master songwriters". At musicOMH, John Murphy rated this release 3 out of 5 stars, writing that "the full band efforts that stand out most" and "while it's sometimes a bit too unassuming for its own good, King Of A Land does well to remind the world of just what a legendary songwriter Yusuf/Cat Stevens is". The Times's Will Hodgkinson rated this album 3 out of 5 stars, writing that the album is fundamentally good, but it is missing the "unfulfilled quality that elevated golden age Cat Stevens from standard singer-songwriter fare and into the realm of artistic profundity". In an 8/10 review, Uncut opined that King of a Land presents "lyrically teasing exercises in self examination... Yusuf breaks ground". In Under the Radar, Frank Valish scored this album a 7.5 out of 10, praising Stevens' voice and the "exquisite" packaging of the album.

In Hot Press, Jackie Hayden gave this release 9 out of 10, calling it "a welcome return to form" that showcase Stevens' "honeyed as ever" voice. Writing for The Line of Best Fit, Tanatat Khuttapan gave this release a 7 out of 10, ending his review, "heartfelt stories such as these show – not tell; King of a Land does so in the last leg, but there's always a nagging wonder of what the record would've been had it done so throughout its entirety". Henry Carrigan of No Depression summed up his review, "[King of a Land] contains no surprises, and fans of Yusuf/Cat Stevens will welcome an album that sounds like what they've come to expect. At its worst, its overproduced; at its best, the album is redundant". Writing for Ultimate Classic Rock, Michael Gallucci states that "it's the more adult songs on King of a Land that work best".

Editors at Reader's Digest included this among the best albums of the year. Editors at AllMusic included this among their favorite singer-songwriter music albums of 2023.

== Track listing ==
1. "Train on a Hill" – 3:09
2. "King of a Land" – 4:14
3. "Pagan Run" – 4:33
4. "He Is True" – 1:40
5. "All Nights, All Days" – 2:22
6. "Another Night in the Rain" – 3:53
7. "Things" – 3:05
8. "Son of Mary" – 4:39
9. "Highness" – 3:56
10. "The Boy Who Knew How to Climb Walls" – 4:26
11. "How Good It Feels" – 4:35
12. "Take the World Apart" – 2:44

== Personnel ==
"Train on a Hill"

- Yusuf/Cat Stevens – guitars, synthesizer, keyboards, vocals, production
- Eric Appapoulay – nylon guitar, 12-string guitar
- Jon Ashton-Thomas – brass arrangement
- David Hefti – engineering, mixing
- Jel Jongen – trombone
- Russ Kunkel – drums, percussion
- Bruce Lynch – acoustic bass, keyboards
- Carlo Mertens – trombone
- Serge Plume – trumpet
- Paul Samwell-Smith – production

"King of a Land"

- Yusuf/Cat Stevens – nylon guitar, synthesizer, keyboards, chorus, vocals, production
- Angel Kids – chorus
  - Ariana
  - Safiye Dizdar
  - Liyana
  - Nalini Patel
  - Varun Patel
  - Kimi Scholz
  - Yasmina (Hassain) Mikaela Scholz
  - Muammad Sulaiman
  - Sian Sweeney
  - Carl Sweeney
- Eric Appapoulay – slide guitar
- David Hefti – engineering, mixing
- Russ Kunkel – drums, percussion, cajón
- Bruce Lynch – Fender bass
- Paul Samwell-Smith – production
- Peter Vettese – keyboards, pizz. strings, tuba, flute

"Pagan Run"

- Yusuf/Cat Stevens – guitars, synth pads, hand claps, vocals, production
- Eric Appapoulay – acoustic guitar, electric guitar
- Jon Ashton-Thomas – brass arrangement
- David Hefti – engineering
- Paul Hicks – mixing
- Michelle John – backing vocals
- Jel Jongen – trombone
- Russ Kunkel – drums, hand claps
- Bruce Lynch – acoustic bass
- Carlo Mertens – trombone
- Serge Plume – trumpet
- Paul Samwell-Smith – production
- Beverley Skeete – backing vocals
- Daniel Thomas – backing vocals
- Peter Vettese – Hammond organ, keyboards

"He Is True"

- Yusuf/Cat Stevens – nylon guitar, harmonium, keyboards, backing vocals, vocals, production
- Eric Appapoulay – nylon guitar
- David Hefti – engineering, mixing
- Russ Kunkel – drums, hand claps
- Bruce Lynch – Fender bass
- Hanna Roos – soprano voice
- Paul Samwell-Smith – choral, production
- Peter Vettese – Mellotron
- Kwame Yeboah – choral

"All Nights, All Days"

- Yusuf/Cat Stevens – guitars, vocals, production
- Jo Ambros – pedal steel guitar, electric guitar
- Eric Appapoulay – electric guitar, 12-string guitar
- Marlon Browden – drums
- Stefan Fuhr – bass
- David Hefti – engineering
- Paul Hicks – mixing
- Russ Kunkel – tambourine
- Paul Samwell-Smith – production
- Peter Vettese – piano

"Another Night in the Rain"

- Yusuf/Cat Stevens – guitars, vocals, recording, production
- Jo Ambros – electric guitars
- Marlon Browden – drums
- Stefan Fuhr – bass
- David Hefti – engineering, mixing
- Frank Schellenberger – keyboards
- Kwame Yeboah – synthesizers

"Things"

- Yusuf/Cat Stevens – acoustic guitar, synth organ, brass, vocals, production
- Martin Allcock – Fender jazz fretless bass
- Eric Appapoulay – electric guitar, 12-string guitar
- Alun Davies – claps
- David Hefti – engineering
- Paul Hicks – mixing
- Russ Kunkel – claps
- Paul Samwell-Smith – production
- Peter Vettese – keyboards
- Kwame Yeboah – drums, shakers

"Son of Mary"

- Yusuf/Cat Stevens – guitars, synthesizer, keyboards, vocals, production
- David Hefti – engineering, mixing
- Russ Kunkel – bass drum
- Bruce Lynch – acoustic bass
- Paul Samwell-Smith – production
- Peter Vettese – additional keyboards

"Highness"

- Yusuf/Cat Stevens – nylon guitar, vocals, recording, production
- Jo Ambross – electric guitars
- Eric Appapoulay – electric guitar, 12-string guitar
- Martin Browden – drums
- Stefan Fuhr – bass
- David Hefti – engineering
- Paul Hicks – mixing
- Nick Ingman – orchestra arrangement
- Michelle John – backing vocals
- Pete Murray – additional piano
- Steve Pearce – additional bass
- Frank Ricotti – tympani, percussion
- Beverley Skeete – backing vocals
- Daniel Thomas – backing vocals

"The Boy Who Knew How to Climb Walls"

- Yusuf/Cat Stevens – guitars, synthesizer, bass, backing vocals, vocals, recording, production
- Eric Appapoulay – electric slide guitar, backing vocals
- Kwame Yeboah – drums, backing vocals
- Paul Hicks – mixing

"How Good It Feels"

- Yusuf/Cat Stevens – nylon guitar, acoustic guitar, synthesizer, vocals, production
- Eric Appapoulay – nylon guitar
- David Hefti – engineering, mixing
- Nick Ingman – orchestra arrangement
- Russ Kunkel – drums, cymbals
- Bruce Lynch – Fender bass
- Hanna Roos – soprano voice
- Peter Vettese – keyboards

"Take the World Apart"

- Yusuf/Cat Stevens – guitars, keyboards, claps, chorus, vocals, recording, production
- Bruce Lynch – Fender bass
- Paul Hicks – mixing

Additional personnel

- Peter H. Reynolds – illustrations
- Nick Wallage – engineering on orchestral recordings
- Yoriyos – art concept, design
- Yusuf/Cat Stevens – art concept, design

== Chart performance ==
Chart performance for King of a Land
Chart	Peak
Austrian Albums (Ö3 Austria)	32
Belgian Albums (Ultratop Wallonia)	136
German Albums (Offizielle Top 100)	10
Scottish Albums (Official Charts)	11
Spanish Albums (Promusicae)	91
Swiss Albums (Schweizer Hitparade)	32
UK Albums (Official Charts)	49
UK Independent Albums (Official Charts)	2
