= On the Road to Findout: Greatest Hits =

Compilation album by Yusuf / Cat Stevens
- Released: 17 September 2025
- Genre: Folk
- Labels: Cat-O-Log; A&M; UMe

Yusuf / Cat Stevens chronology
King of a Land (2023)	On the Road to Findout: Greatest Hits (2025)

On the Road to Findout: Greatest Hits is a compilation album by English musician Cat Stevens (also known as Yusuf Islam and Yusuf / Cat Stevens). It was released on 17 September 2025 by Cat-O-Log, A&M Records and UMe. A career-spanning compilation, it was released in support on Stevens' memoir Cat On the Road to Findout. The memoir itself was published on 7 October 2025.

== Release and reception ==
Professional ratings
Review scores
Source	Rating
Spill Magazine	9.5/10

The compilation was released on compact disc and vinyl and as a deluxe edition with an extra disc. Writing for Spill Magazine, critic Aaron Badgley wrote it "shows how far Yusuf/Cat Stevens came from his first hit "Matthew and Son" to his mid 1970s chart dominating hits through to his most recent work.", noting it "could be listened to as an autobiography" due to it accompanying a memoir.

== Track listing ==
=== Single disc ===
1. Matthew & Son
2. Here Comes My Baby
3. The First Cut is the Deepest
4. Lady D'Arbanville
5. Where Do the Children Play?
6. Wild World
7. If You Want To Sing Out, Sing Out
8. The Wind
9. Morning Has Broken (Eleanor Farjeon)
10. Moonshadow
11. Peace Train
12. Sitting
13. Can't Keep It In
14. The Hurt
15. Oh Very Young
16. Banapple Gas
17. (Remember the Days of the) Old Schoolyard
18. Just Another Night
19. Heaven/Where True Love Goes
20. Thinking 'Bout You
21. Gold Digger
22. Blackness of the Night
23. Father and Son
24. Take the World Apart

=== 2-disc/4 LP edition ===
==== Disc 1 ====
1. I Love My Dog
2. Matthew & Son
3. Here Comes My Baby
4. The First Cut is the Deepest
5. Lady D'Arbanville
6. Trouble
7. Where Do the Children Play?
8. Wild World
9. Father and Son
10. Tea for the Tillerman
11. Don't Be Shy
12. If You Want To Sing Out, Sing Out
13. The Wind
14. How Can I Tell You
15. Morning Has Broken (Eleanor Farjeon)
16. Moonshadow
17. Peace Train
18. Sitting
19. I Want to Live in a Wigwam
20. Can't Keep It In
21. Foreigner Suite (Excerpt)
22. The Hurt
23. Ready
24. Oh Very Young
25. Another Saturday Night (Sam Cooke)

==== Disc 2 ====
1. Majik of Majiks
2. Banapple Gas
3. (Remember the Days of the) Old Schoolyard
4. (I Never Wanted) To Be a Star
5. Just Another Night
6. Last Love Song
7. Butterfly
8. Heaven/Where True Love Goes
9. Maybe There's a World
10. Don't Let Me Be Misunderstood (Bennie Benjamin, Horace Ott, Sol Marcus)
11. Thinking 'Bout You
12. Roadsinger
13. Gold Digger
14. Dying to Live (Edgar Winter)
15. Blackness of the Night
16. Grandsons
17. Miles from Nowhere
18. On the Road to Find Out
19. Father and Son
20. Here Comes the Sun (George Harrison) (previously unreleased on vinyl or CD)
21. All Nights, All Days
22. Take the World Apart

== Charts ==
Chart performance for On the Road to Findout: Greatest Hits
Chart (2025)	Peak position
Scottish Albums (Official Charts)	24
