= Back to Earth (Cat Stevens album) =

Studio album by Cat Stevens
- Released: 1 December 1978
- Recorded: 1978
- Studios: Sweet Silence Studios, Copenhagen, Denmark; Le Studio, Morin Heights, Canada; Advision Studios, London, England; CBS Studios, New York City; Long View Farm, North Brookfield, Massachusetts
- Genre: Soft rock
- Length: 32:51
- Labels: Island (UK/Europe); A&M (US/Canada)
- Producers: Paul Samwell-Smith; Cat Stevens

Cat Stevens chronology
Izitso (1977)	Back to Earth (1978)	Morning Has Broken (1981)

Singles from Back to Earth
- 1. "Bad Brakes" Released: 1978; 2. "Last Love Song" Released: February 1979; 3. "Randy" Released: April 1979

Professional ratings
Review scores
Source	Rating
Allmusic	3/5 stars

Back to Earth is the eleventh studio album released by the British singer/songwriter Cat Stevens. It is the only album he recorded using the name Cat Stevens after his conversion to Islam until the release in September 2017 of The Laughing Apple, his fifteenth studio album (credited to "Yusuf / Cat Stevens"). It was also the last album of contemporary Western music that he recorded until An Other Cup, 28 years later.

== Background ==
On 23 December 1977, Stevens entered the Regent's Park Mosque in London and formally embraced Islam.

After converting to Islam, he informed the chief Imam at the Regent's Park Mosque of his career in music. He encouraged Stevens to continue, however Stevens realized that "apart from the creative side, there were many other aspects about the music industry which infringed negatively on the Islamic way of life", resulting in him giving up music. He sold almost all of his musical gear to Bonham's auction house in 1981. He told a Islamic magazine in 1980, "I have suspended my activities in music for fear that they may divert me from the true path, but I will not be dogmatic in saying that I will never make music again. You can’t say that without adding, ‘Insha Allah’ (if God Wishes)." Years later, he stated: "This issue of music in Islam is not as cut and dried as I was led to believe. I relied on heresy, that was perhaps my mistake." He returned to pop music in the 2000s, nearly three decades later.

On 4 July 1978, Steven Georgiou changed his name to Yusuf Islam but he still owed his record company Island/A&M one more "Cat Stevens" album under his recording contract.

Yusuf recorded this album with his producer from the early 1970s, Paul Samwell-Smith, his keyboardist multi-instrumentalist, Jean Alain Roussel and arranger Del Newman, which includes his guitarist, Alun Davies, also his drummer Gerry Conway, neither of whom had appeared on Stevens' previous 1977 album Izitso. Alun co-wrote two new songs. The old team had now come back together to complete the final record. The album was recorded at several locations, including Sweet Silence Studios in Copenhagen, Long View Farm in Massachusetts, Advision Studios in London, and CBS in New York City; it was completed at Le Studio in Quebec.

At this point, Yusuf was praying five times daily and the sessions took on a melancholy edge, as it was implicitly understood that they were to be the last. On 1 December 1978, the album Back to Earth was released. “It was like going back to my original nature," reflected Stevens at the time. "Back to wide-eyed childhood again.” On 3 December, Yusuf's father Stavros Georgiou died. As he was unwilling to promote the album Back to Earth with a tour, it peaked at only No. 33 on the Billboard charts, and its singles "Bad Brakes", and "Randy" made a poor showing in the charts. The UK single release, "Last Love Song", released on Island in February 1979, similarly failed to chart. All three singles were backed with the instrumental "Nascimento".

Back to Earth features a return to the acoustic guitar sound of Stevens' early 1970s albums like Tea for the Tillerman. Two of the songs, "Just Another Night" and "Last Love Song", express bitterness about how he was treated by the music industry, with lyrics such as "If you don't want me, maybe I don't want you." However, in the song Never, Stevens hints that he may return to music someday: "There's going to be another time; there's going to be another moment." Likewise, in the song “Just Another Night” when Stevens suggests an eventual reunion with his fans and the music industry: “But don't you worry it's alright; If you should come around; Any night or any day; I won't ever let you down.”

In 1995, Stevens released his first album since leaving the music industry, a spoken-word recording on the life of Muhammad, titled The Life of the Last Prophet. The years following would provide several spiritual albums and some songs, including new renditions of some of his original songs, such as "Peace Train" and "Wild World". These would be compiled into a compilation album titled Footsteps in the Light. Under the name "Yusuf", he would return to pop music with the release of An Other Cup in 2006.

== Track listing ==
All songs by Cat Stevens, except where noted:

=== Side one ===
1. "Just Another Night" – 3:49
2. "Daytime" (Stevens, Alun Davies) – 3:55
3. "Bad Brakes" (Stevens, Davies) – 3:27
4. "Randy" – 3:12
5. "The Artist" [instrumental] – 2:32

=== Side two ===
1. "Last Love Song" – 3:27
2. "Nascimento" [instrumental] – 3:16
3. "Father" – 4:08
4. "New York Times" – 3:24
5. "Never" – 3:01

== Personnel ==
- Cat Stevens – electric guitar, acoustic guitar, steel guitar, lead guitar, piano, electric piano, Hammond organ, ARP String Synthesizer, harmonica, bass, vocals, backing vocals
- Alun Davies – electric guitar, acoustic guitar, classical guitar, rhythm guitar
- Brian Cole – steel guitar on "Just Another Night"
- Eric Johnson – electric guitar on "Bad Brakes"
- Bruce Lynch – double bass, bass
- Will Lee – bass on "New York Times"
- Jean Roussel – piano, electric piano, organ, hammond organ, synthesizer, brass, strings, arrangements
- Graham Smith – harmonica on "Bad Brakes"
- John Marson – harp on "Daytime"
- Don Weller – saxophone on "Nascimento"
- Tower of Power – horns on "Nascimento"
- Paul Samwell-Smith – backing vocals on "Daytime" and "Last Love Song"
- The McCrarys – backing vocals on "New York Times"
- Luther Vandross – backing vocals on "New York Times"
- Milton Nascimento – vocals on "Nascimento"
- Gerry Conway – drums, percussion
- Steve Jordan – drums, percussion on "The Artist" and "New York Times"

== Charts ==
Chart (1978–1979)	Peak position
Australia (Kent Music Report)	89
US Billboard Top LPs & Tape	33
