= Small Kindness =

Small Kindness is a charity organization founded by Yusuf Islam (formerly known as Cat Stevens). Small Kindness has earned the respect and admiration of local communities in all its major countries of operation. In recognition of this Yusuf Islam was awarded the World Social Award by the World Awards Committee for the important work Small Kindness is doing and in 2004 the charity earned the WANGO Humanitarian Award from the World Association of NGOs.

== Program Strategy ==
To help the most vulnerable victims of war and conflict, such as orphans, widows, and young girls, by providing direct relief and support with minimum administrational costs, by employing and utilizing local staff and infrastructure, being continuously sensitive to the cultural needs of the communities we are serving.

=== Living Necessities ===
Direct financial support for the most needy, especially orphans, widows, elderly and refugees.

=== Education ===
Courses for female students and specialised training in Information Technology, Management, Foreign languages, Marketing, Finance and Accountancy, leading to professional qualifications meeting European standards; enabling students to gain employment. Also providing University scholarships to assist needy students, particularly young women.

=== Shelter ===
Small Kindness assists whenever possible to rebuild the houses of victims that have been destroyed or damaged during times of conflict. In the Balkans, many thousands are still displaced through ethnic-cleansing and need shelter due to the loss of their homes.

=== Culture & Leisure ===
Establishment of Recreation Centers where youth can meet and enjoy various activities such as sports and learn to use computer technology through games and motivational software.

=== Publications ===
Publishing magazines and tape cassettes in local languages for children and families that promote healthy moral and cultural values through entertaining articles and cartoon comic series.

One of the problems we face as human beings is the fulfilment of our duty to give help to those less fortunate than ourselves on this increasingly shrinking planet - but how, and to whom? Well, unfortunately the answer is never far away. The sight of bloodied faces in war scenarios, the pictures of fatherless children, roofless homes and the tragedies which beset our world with riveting punctuality, like an endless TV series, are always there to inform us.

— Yusuf Islam, Small Kindness
