= Boots and Sand =

Song by Yusuf Islam

Single by Yusuf with Paul McCartney & Dolly Parton
- A-side: "Roadsinger (double A-side)"
- Released: 5 May 2009 (bonus track on Roadsinger); 20 July 2009 (single release)
- Recorded: Summer 2008
- Genre: Folk rock
- Length: 3:43
- Label: Island

Yusuf singles chronology
"The Day The World Gets 'Round (with Klaus Voormann)" (2009)	"Roadsinger" / "Boots and Sand" (2009)	"My People" (2011)

"Boots and Sand" is a song written and recorded by Yusuf Islam (commonly known as Cat Stevens). It appears as an iTunes bonus track on his album Roadsinger (To Warm You Through the Night) which was released on 5 May 2009. The song was also released as a double-A side single together with "Roadsinger", on 20 July 2009.

"Boots and Sand" was written by Yusuf after he was denied entry to the US in 2004, and features guest appearances by both Paul McCartney and Dolly Parton.

The track was recorded in several different studios and countries during the summer of 2008, and mixed by Thomas Juth at Kensaltown Studios in London.
