= A Is for Allah =

Studio album by Yusuf Islam
- Released: 11 July 2000
- Genre: Children's, nasheed
- Label: Mountain of Light

Yusuf Islam chronology
I Have No Cannons That Roar (2000)	A Is for Allah (2000)	Bismillah (2001)

Professional ratings
Review scores
Source	Rating
AllMusic	4/5 stars

A is for Allah is the name of a double album created for Muslim children by Yusuf Islam (formerly known as Cat Stevens). The album was released on 11 July 2000 by Resurgence UK Records. The title song was written in 1980 upon the birth of Yusuf's first child, a girl named Hasanah. Yusuf wanted his daughter to learn the Arabic language as well as read and understand the Qu'ran (in Arabic). He himself was raised in London, England, the same city where they still lived, and had kept a home there throughout his life. Being a recent convert to the Islamic religion, he was concerned with the difficulties he would face securing a high-quality 'Islamic' education for his children.

The musician used the song as a way to teach not only his daughter, but also other children, about the 28-letter Arabic alphabet. This kind of Islamic music is also known as nasheed in the Arabic language. The album also features other Muslim musicians, including Zain Bhikha from South Africa, who sang on all but one track. The album had been in the works since 1994, with the exception of the title track, which dated back to 1980. It was also released with a large colourful book, with each page displaying a letter of the Arabic alphabet, by Mountain of Light, Yusuf Islam's own record imprint.

== Track listing ==
=== Disc one ===
1. "Introduction"
2. "A: Allah"
3. "Ayat al-Kursi (2:255)"
4. "Say He Is Allah"
5. "B: Bismillah"
6. "Bismillah"
7. "T: Taqwa"
8. "Th: Thawab"
9. "J: Jannah"
10. "Surah Al-Kahf (18:31)"
11. "H: Hajj"
12. "Kh: Khatam"
13. "D: Deen"
14. "Our Guide is the Qur'an"
15. "Dh: Dhikr"
16. "R: Ramadan"
17. "Z: Zakah"
18. "Surah At-Tawba (9:34-35)"
19. "S: Salam"
20. "Salam, Salam"
21. "Sh: Shams"
22. "Surah Al-An'am (6:79)"
23. "S: Salat"
24. "D: Duha"
25. "Surah Ad-Dhuha (93:1-11)"
26. "T: Tareeq"

=== Disc two ===
1. "Turn to Allah"
2. "Z: Zill"
3. "I: Ilm"
4. "Gh: Ghayb"
5. "F: Fatihah"
6. "Surah Al-Fatihah (1:1-7)"
7. "Q: Qur'an"
8. "Surah Al-Qadr (97:1-5)"
9. "Qur'anu Rabbee"
10. "K: Kalimah"
11. "L: La Ilaha Illa-Allah"
12. "M: Muhammad Rasul-Allah"
13. "Seal of the Prophets"
14. "N: Nawm"
15. "Surah As-Sajda (32:16)"
16. "H: Hijrah"
17. "W: Wu'du"
18. "Surah Al-Muddaththir (74:1-5)"
19. "Y: Yawm Ad-Deen"
20. "Surah Al-Infitar (82:1-19)"
21. "A Is for Allah"
22. "Last Word"
