= An Other Cup =

Studio album by Yusuf
- Released: 14 November 2006
- Recorded: April–August 2006
- Genre: Folk rock
- Length: 44:21
- Labels: Ya/Polydor (UK/Europe); Ya/Atlantic (US/Canada)
- Producers: Rick Nowels, Yusuf

Yusuf chronology
Majikat (2004)	An Other Cup (2006)	Roadsinger (2009)

An Other Cup is the twelfth studio album by Yusuf (formerly known as Cat Stevens), released on 10 November 2006 in Germany, 13 November in the UK and the US and worldwide on 14 November. It is Yusuf's first Western pop album since Back to Earth, which was released in 1978 under the name Cat Stevens. An Other Cup is the artist's first studio album under the name Yusuf. It heralded his return to Western pop music.

== History ==
On the album cover, the artist is credited as "Yusuf" with a cover label identifying him as "the artist formerly known as Cat Stevens". In an interview as to why he presented both names, he said, "You know, the cup is there to be filled... with whatever you want to fill it with. For those people looking for Cat Stevens, they'll probably find him in this record. If you want to find Yusuf, go a bit deeper, you'll find him."

Craig Kallman, the chief executive officer of Atlantic Records, described the new record as speaking to "the essence of all the great Cat Stevens albums of the past", adding: "It was a chilling experience sitting in a very tiny rehearsal room as he was working through all the new material."

On the BBC's Andrew Marr Show, Yusuf said: "It's me, so it's going to sound like that of course... This is the real thing [...] When my son brought the guitar back into the house, you know, that was the turning point. It opened a flood of new ideas and music which I think a lot of people would connect with." In another interview, Yusuf said, "I feel right about making music and singing about life in this fragile world again. It is important for me to be able to help bridge the cultural gaps others are sometimes frightened to cross."

Professional ratings
Review scores
Source	Rating
Allmusic	link
The Guardian	link
Hot Press	4.5/5 stars
Los Angeles Times	link
Mojo	link
USA Today	link

== Track listing ==
All songs written by Yusuf, except where noted.

1. "Midday (Avoid City After Dark)" – 4:24
2. "Heaven/Where True Love Goes" – 4:49
3. "Maybe There's a World" – 3:06
4. "One Day at a Time" – 4:54
5. "When Butterflies Leave" – 0:41
6. "In the End" – 4:02
7. "Don't Let Me Be Misunderstood" (Bennie Benjamin, Gloria Caldwell, Sol Marcus) – 3:22
8. "I Think I See the Light" – 5:34
9. "Whispers from a Spiritual Garden" – 2:04
10. "The Beloved" – 4:51
11. "Greenfields, Golden Sands" – 3:25
12. "There Is Peace" – 3:03 (Bonus track on the UK edition)

== Charts ==
=== Weekly charts ===
Chart (2006)	Peak position
Austrian Albums (Ö3 Austria)	2
Belgian Albums (Ultratop Flanders)	99
Dutch Albums (Album Top 100)	69
French Albums (SNEP)	81
German Albums (Offizielle Top 100)	2
Italian Albums (FIMI)	22
Norwegian Albums (VG-lista)	17
Swedish Albums (Sverigetopplistan)	16
Swiss Albums (Schweizer Hitparade)	14
UK Albums (OCC)	20

=== Year-end charts ===
Chart (2006)	Position
Austrian Albums (Ö3 Austria)	65
German Albums (Offizielle Top 100)	95

Chart (2007)	Position
Austrian Albums (Ö3 Austria)	52
German Albums (Offizielle Top 100)	34
