= Cat Stevens =

British musician (born 1948)

Yusuf Islam / Cat Stevens
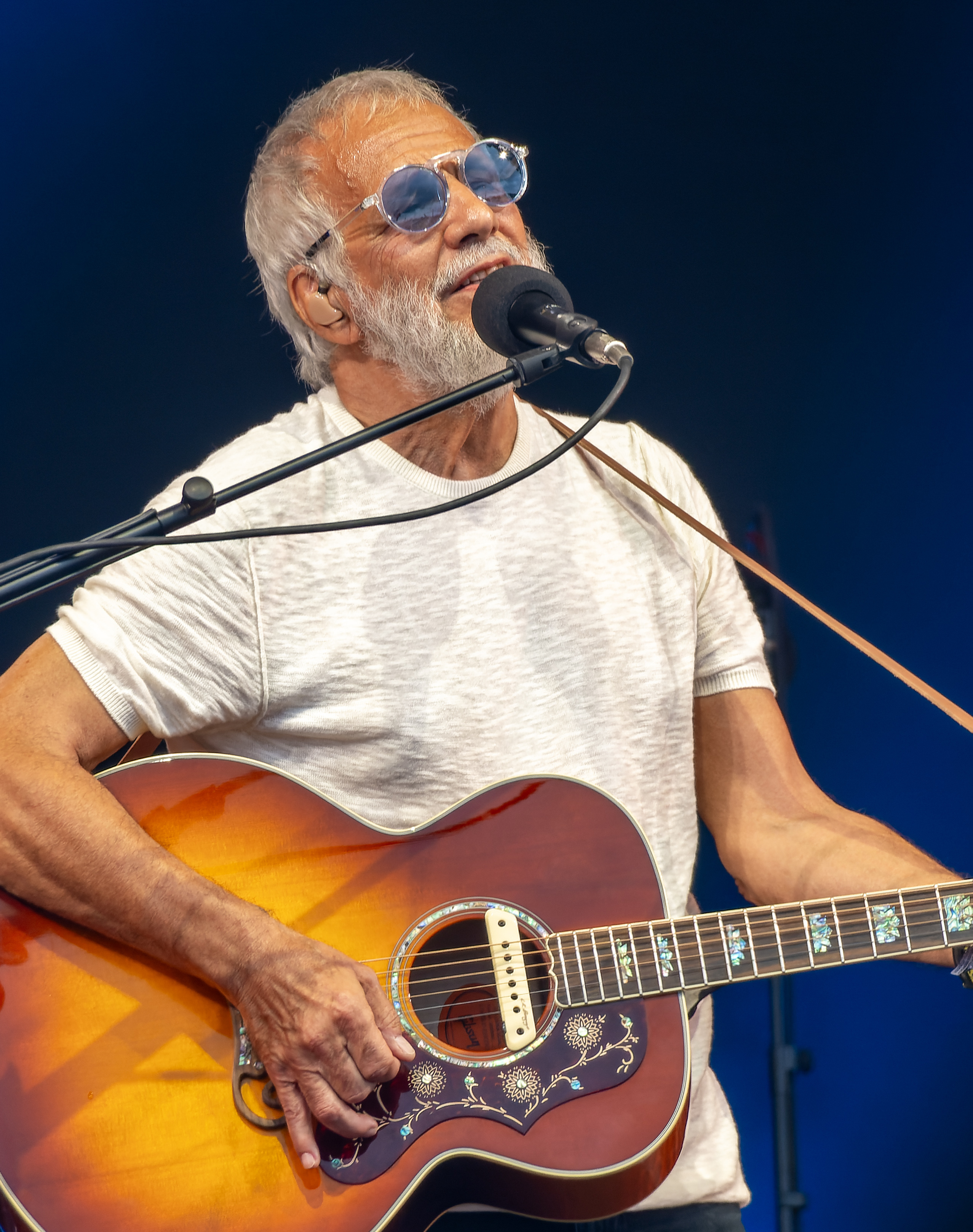
- Stevens performing at Glastonbury Festival 2023

Background information
- Also known as: Steve Adams; Cat Stevens; Yusuf Islam; Yusuf
- Born: Steven Demetre Georgiou; 21 July 1948 (age 78); Marylebone, London, England
- Genres: Folk; rock; pop; Islamic
- Occupations: Singer-songwriter; musician
- Instruments: Vocals; guitar; keyboards
- Years active: 1965–1980 (as Cat Stevens); 1995–2014 (as Yusuf Islam or Yusuf); 2017–present (as Yusuf / Cat Stevens)
- Labels: Deram; Island; A&M; Mountain of Light; Jamal; Ya; Atlantic; Legacy; Cat-O-Log; BMG/Dark Horse
- Spouse: Fauzia Mubarak Ali (m. 1979)
- Website: catstevens.com

Yusuf Islam (born Steven Demetre Georgiou; 21 July 1948), commonly known by his stage names Cat Stevens or Yusuf/Cat Stevens, is a British singer-songwriter and musician. He has sold more than 100 million records and has more than two billion streams. His musical career has explored folk, rock, pop, and, later in his career, Islamic music. Following two decades in which he performed only music which met strict religious standards, he returned to making secular music in 2006. He was inducted into the Rock and Roll Hall of Fame in 2014. He has received two honorary doctorates and awards for promoting peace as well as other humanitarian awards.

His 1967 debut album reached top 10 in the UK charts, with its title song "Matthew and Son" peaking at No. 2, becoming Stevens's highest charting single in Britain to date. Stevens's albums Tea for the Tillerman (1970) and Teaser and the Firecat (1971) were certified triple platinum in the US. His 1972 album Catch Bull at Four went to No. 1 on the US Billboard 200 and spent weeks at the top of several other major charts. He earned ASCAP songwriting awards in 2005 and 2006 for "The First Cut Is the Deepest", which has been a hit for four artists. His other hit songs include "Father and Son", "Wild World", "Moonshadow", "Peace Train", and "Morning Has Broken".

Stevens converted to Islam in December 1977, and adopted the name Yusuf Islam the following year. The same year he released his album Izitso before announcing his conversion with hits such as "(Remember the Days of the) Old Schoolyard", "(I Never Wanted) To Be a Star", and "Sweet Jamaica". In 1979, he auctioned his guitars for charity, and left his musical career to devote himself to educational and philanthropic causes in the Muslim community. He has since bought back at least one of the guitars he sold as a result of the efforts of his son, Yoriyos. Stevens was embroiled in a controversy regarding comments he made in 1989 about the fatwa placed on author Salman Rushdie in response to the publication of Rushdie's novel The Satanic Verses. He has explained the incident stating: "I was cleverly framed by certain questions. I never supported the fatwa."

In 2006, Stevens returned to pop music by releasing his first new studio album of new pop songs in 28 years, titled An Other Cup. With that release and subsequent ones, he dropped the surname "Islam" from the album cover art – using the stage name Yusuf as a mononym. In 2009, he released the album Roadsinger and, in 2014, he released the album Tell 'Em I'm Gone and began his first US tour since 1978. His second North American tour since his resurgence, featuring 12 shows in intimate venues, ran from 12 September to 7 October 2016. In 2017, he released the album The Laughing Apple, now using the stage name Yusuf / Cat Stevens, using the Cat Stevens name for the first time in 39 years. In September 2020, he released Tea for the Tillerman 2, a reimagining of his album Tea for the Tillerman to celebrate its 50th anniversary, and in June 2023, King of a Land, a new studio album.

== Early life and education ==
Steven Demetre Georgiou, born on 21 July 1948 in the Marylebone area of London, was the youngest child of a Greek Cypriot father, Stavros Georgiou (1900–1978), and a Swedish mother, Ingrid Wickman (1915–1989). He has an older sister, Anita, and a brother, David Gordon. The family lived above the Moulin Rouge, a restaurant his parents operated on the north end of Shaftesbury Avenue, a short walk from Piccadilly Circus in the Soho theatre district of London. All family members worked in the restaurant. His parents divorced when he was about eight years old but continued to maintain the family restaurant and live above it. Stevens has a half-brother, George Georgiou, born in Greece, presumably from his father's first marriage in Greece.

Although his father was Greek Orthodox and his mother was a Baptist, Georgiou was sent to St Joseph Roman Catholic Primary School, Macklin Street, which was closer to his father's business on Drury Lane. Georgiou developed an interest in piano at a young age, eventually using the family baby grand piano to work out the chords, since no one else there played well enough to teach him. At 15, inspired by the popularity of the Beatles, he became interested in the guitar. He persuaded his father to pay £8 (equivalent to approx. £145 in March 2026) for his first guitar, and he began playing it and writing songs. He occasionally escaped his family responsibilities by going to the rooftop above their home and listening to the tunes of the musicals drifting from around the corner on Denmark Street, then the centre of the British music industry. Stevens said that West Side Story particularly affected him and gave him a "different view of life". With interests in both art and music, he and his mother moved to Gävle, Sweden, where he attended primary school (Solängsskolan) and started developing his drawing skills after being influenced by his uncle Hugo Wickman, a painter. They subsequently returned to England.

He attended other local West End schools, where he says he was constantly in trouble and did poorly in everything but art. He was called 'the artist boy' and said, "I was beat up, but I was noticed". He took a one-year course at Hammersmith School of Art, considering a career as a cartoonist. Though he enjoyed art (his later record albums featured his original artwork), he decided to pursue a musical career. He began performing under the name "Steve Adams" in 1965 while at Hammersmith. At that point, his goal was to become a songwriter. As well as the Beatles, other musicians who influenced him were the Kinks, Bob Dylan, Nina Simone, blues artists Lead Belly and Muddy Waters, Biff Rose (particularly Rose's first album), Leo Kottke and Paul Simon. He also sought to emulate composers of musicals, such as George and Ira Gershwin, and Leonard Bernstein. In 1965, he signed a publishing deal with Ardmore & Beechwood and recorded several demos, including "The First Cut Is the Deepest".

== Career ==
=== 1966–1969: Early musical career ===
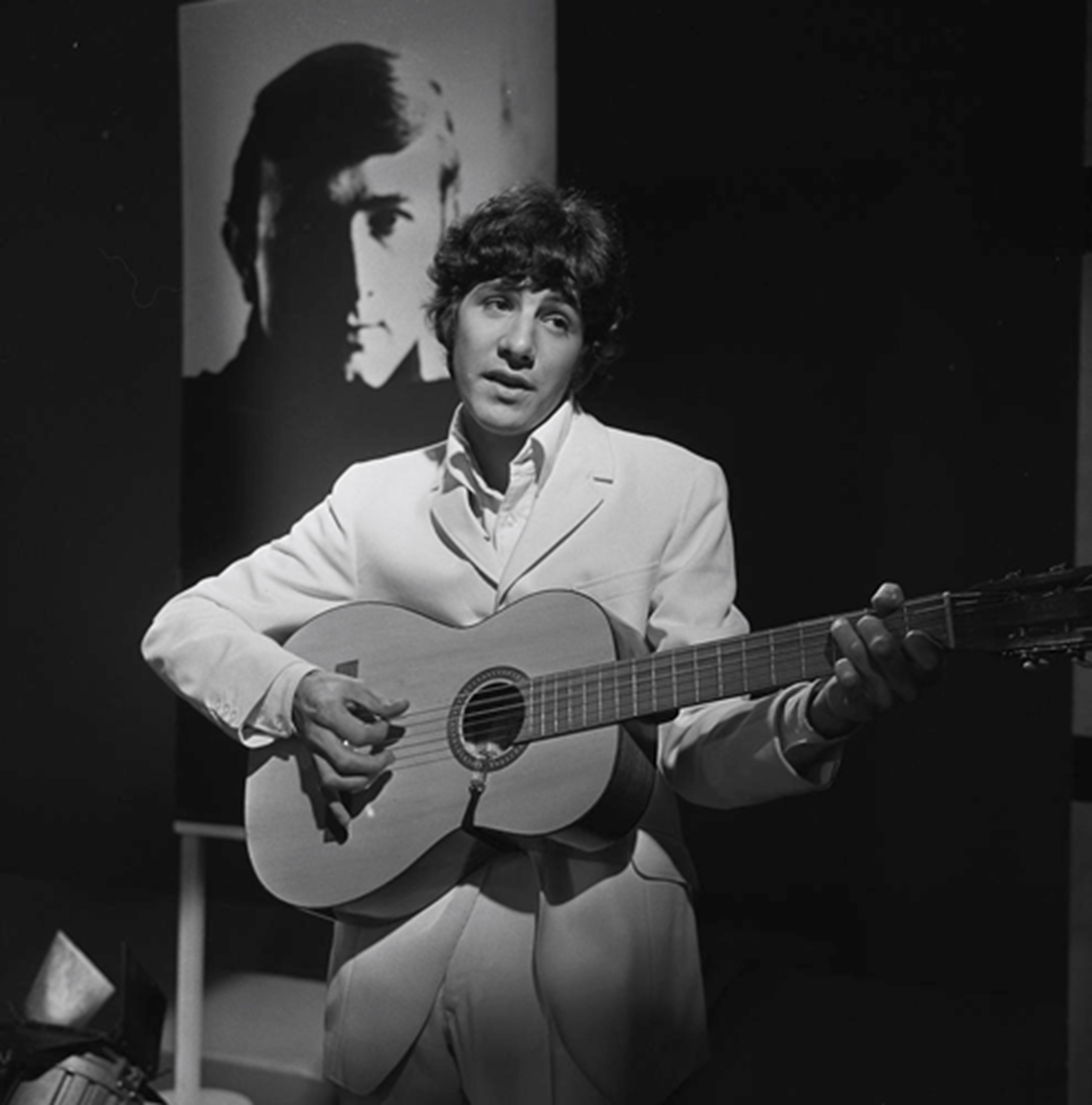
Stevens on Dutch TV in 1966

Georgiou began performing his songs in London coffee houses and pubs. At first he tried to form a band, but realised he preferred performing solo. Thinking his birth name might be difficult to remember, he chose the stage name Cat Stevens, partly because a girlfriend said he had eyes like a cat, but mainly because "I couldn't imagine anyone going to the record store and asking for 'that Steven Demetre Georgiou album'. And in England, and I was sure in America, they loved animals."

==== Initial rise to fame ====
In 1966, at age 18, Stevens was heard by manager/producer Mike Hurst, formerly of British vocal group the Springfields. Hurst was impressed by Stevens's song, "I Love My Dog", however his superior was not. Stevens walked away "looking quite dejected". Despite this, three months later Stevens returned to Hurst claiming to have been rejected by every record company in London. Hurst arranged for free studio time for Stevens to record a demo, deceiving Decca A&R chief Dick Rowe under the pretense that Hurst was recording a Mike D'Abo composition titled "Going, Going, Gone". Rowe was not amused by Hurst's deception, but after hearing the record he contacted Edward Leeds, the head of Decca Records, who was pleased by the song and signed Stevens to a record deal.

Stevens's first singles were hits: "I Love My Dog" reached number 28 on the UK Singles Chart; and "Matthew and Son", the title song from his debut album, reached number 2 in the UK, his highest charting single there to date. In March of 1967, Stevens released his album Matthew and Son, which peaked at number 7 on the UK Albums Chart.

His 3rd single, "I'm Gonna Get Me a Gun", attracted controversy over the lyrics, which tell the story of a man who is tired of being "demoralised" and decides to buy a gun to take revenge on those who "put me down". The song was condemned by Jimmy Savile after it was played on the show Juke Box Jury, who felt it could incite violence among listeners. Stevens later apologized, saying he did not mean to entice children to purchase guns; also explaining the context and that he had written it for a Western musical, hence the lyrics. Nevertheless, the song became Stevens's second UK top 10 single, reaching number 6.

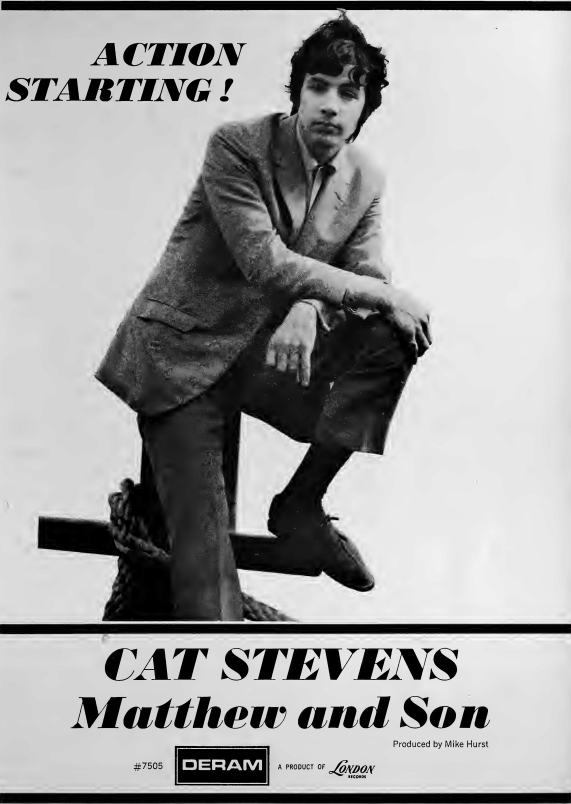
Advertisement for Matthew and Son

Over the next two years, Stevens recorded and toured with an eclectic group of artists ranging from Jimi Hendrix to Engelbert Humperdinck. He was considered a fresh-faced teen star, placing several single releases in the British pop music charts. Some of that success was attributed to the pirate radio station Wonderful Radio London, which gained him fans by playing his records. In August 1967, he was one of several recording artists who had benefited from the station to broadcast messages during its final hour to mourn its closure.

While on tour, Stevens began to "drink and smoke heavily" as his career began to "nosedive". Additionally, Stevens found himself struggling to write another hit song, feeling worn down by the show business.

His next single, "A Bad Night", did not reach higher than no. 20 on the charts, with even Hurst calling it "totally outlandish" and "over the top". The single "Kitty" was Stevens's final charting release in the UK for three years, with his next album New Masters not even charting in the United Kingdom upon release in December 1967.

New Masters is now most notable for "The First Cut Is the Deepest", a song he sold for £30 (equivalent to £500 in 2025) to P. P. Arnold and which became a massive hit for her and an international hit for Keith Hampshire, Rod Stewart, James Morrison and Sheryl Crow. Forty years after he recorded the first demo of the song, it earned him back-to-back ASCAP "Songwriter of the Year" awards, in 2005 and 2006.

==== Changes in musical sound after illness ====
The lack of success of Stevens' second album mirrored a difference of personal tastes in musical direction. He felt a growing resentment of producer Mike Hurst's attempts to re-create the style of his debut album, with heavy-handed orchestration and over-production, rather than the folk rock sound Stevens was attempting to produce. Stevens finally decided to terminate their association after an agent Hurst had appointed attempted to book Stevens onto a Christmas pantomime. After Stevens's refusal, Hurst's agent told Stevens that he was making "the biggest mistake of [his] life". Stevens later admitted to having purposely sabotaged his own contract with Hurst by making outlandishly expensive orchestral demands and threatening legal action, which achieved his goal: to be released from his contract with Deram Records, a sub-label of Decca Records. Hurst described 1968 as a "long interminable legal wrangle"; New Masters was recorded with lawyers present in the studio. "Lovely City (When Do You Laugh?)", a sixth single, failed to crack the top 50. In September of 1968, it was reported that a new Cat Stevens single, titled "Here Comes My Wife", was to be released the upcoming month alongside a new album. The single did not reach the top 50; the album never materialized. Stevens's last single with Deram, "Where Are You", was also considered a failure.

After Stevens left Decca Records, they bundled his first two albums together as a set, hoping to ride the commercial tide of his early success; later his newer labels did the same, and Stevens also released compilations.

On regaining his health at home after his release from the hospital, Stevens recorded some of his newly written songs on his tape recorder and played his changing sound for several new record executives. He hired an agent, Barry Krost, who arranged an audition with Chris Blackwell of Island Records. Blackwell offered him a "chance to record [his songs] whenever and with whomever he liked and, more importantly to Cat, however he liked". With Krost's recommendation, Stevens signed Paul Samwell-Smith, previously the bassist of the Yardbirds, as his new producer.

=== 1970–1973: Height of popularity ===
==== Peak of success ====
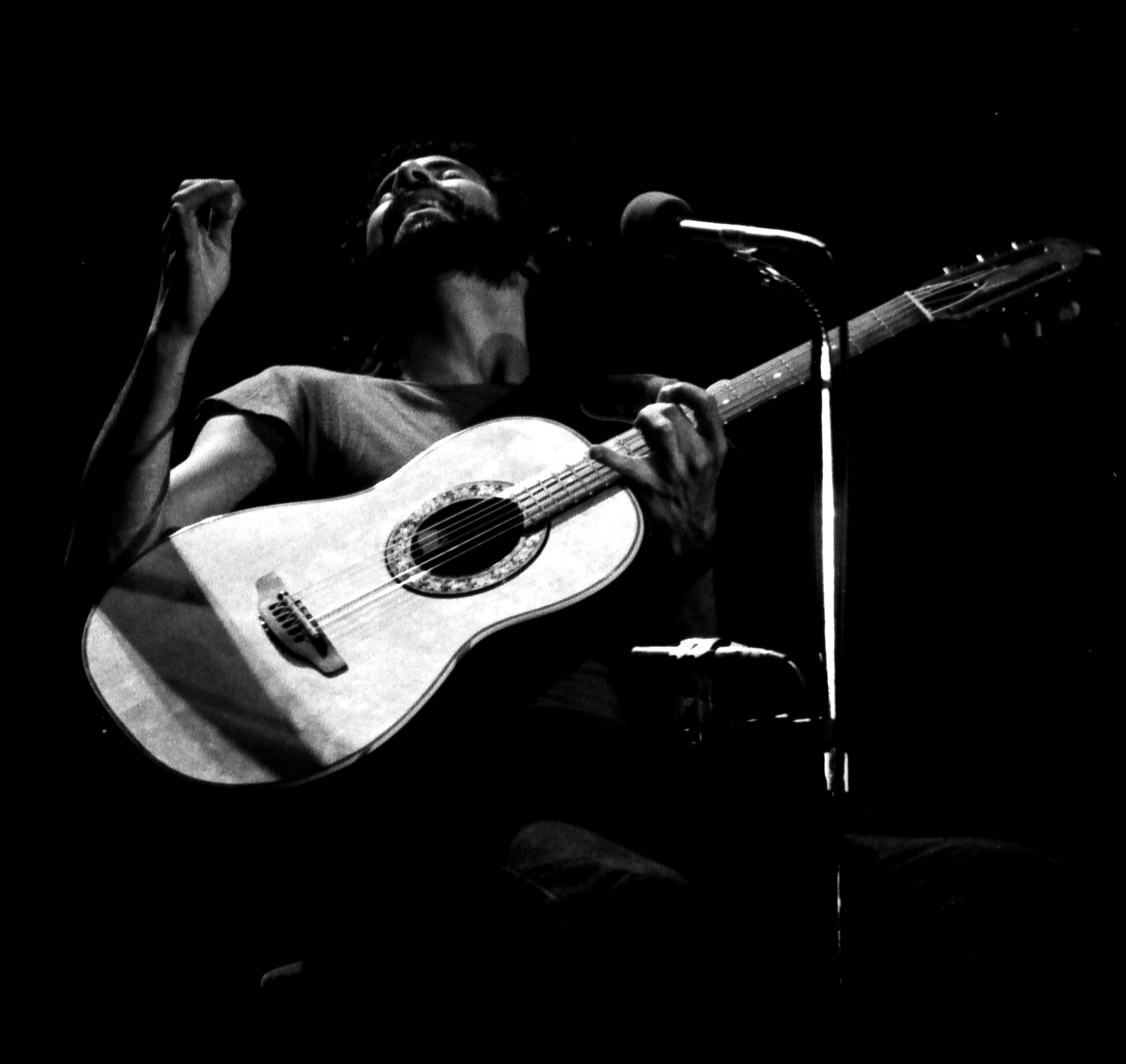
Stevens performing in Böblingen, West Germany, in 1976

Samwell-Smith paired Stevens with guitarist Alun Davies, who was at that time working as a session musician. Davies was the more-experienced veteran of two albums that had already begun to explore the emerging genres of skiffle and folk rock music. Davies was also thought to be a perfect fit with Stevens, particularly for his "fingerwork" on the guitar, harmonising, and backing vocals. They originally met just to record Mona Bone Jakon in 1970, but soon developed a friendship. Davies, like Stevens, was a perfectionist, appearing at all sound checks to be sure that all the equipment and sound were prepared for each concert.

The first single released from Mona Bone Jakon was "Lady D'Arbanville", which Stevens wrote about his young American girlfriend Patti D'Arbanville. The record had a madrigal sound, unlike most music played on pop radio, with djembes and bass in addition to Stevens's and Davies's guitars. It reached number eight in the UK and was the first of his hits to get real airplay in the US. The single sold over one million copies and earned him a gold record in 1971. Other songs written for D'Arbanville included "Maybe You're Right" and "Just Another Night". "Pop Star", a song about his experience as a teen star, and "Katmandu", with Genesis frontman Peter Gabriel playing flute, were also featured. Mona Bone Jakon was an early example of the solo singer-songwriter album format that was becoming popular for other artists as well. Rolling Stone magazine compared its popularity with that of Elton John's Tumbleweed Connection, saying it was played "across the board, across radio formats".

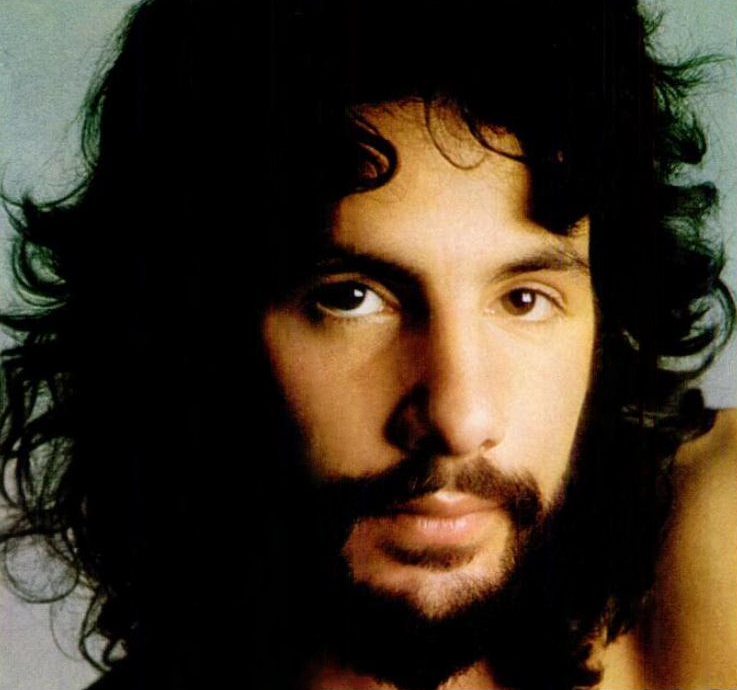
Stevens in 1971, as pictured in the cover artwork for his album Teaser and the Firecat

Mona Bone Jakon was the precursor of Stevens's international breakthrough album, Tea for the Tillerman, which became a Top 10 Billboard hit. Within six months of its release, it had sold over 500,000 copies, attaining gold record status in the United Kingdom and the United States. The combination of Stevens's new folk rock style and accessible lyrics, which spoke of everyday situations and problems, mixed with the beginning of spiritual questions about life, remained in his music from then on. The album features the Top 20 single "Wild World"; a parting song after D'Arbanville moved on. "Wild World" has been credited as the song that gave Tea for the Tillerman 'enough kick' to get it played on FM radio. The head of Island Records, Chris Blackwell, was quoted as calling it "the best album we've ever released". Other album tracks include "Hard-Headed Woman", and "Father and Son" – sung by Stevens in baritone and tenor, portraying the struggle between fathers and sons who contrast their personal choices in life. In 2001, this album was certified by the RIAA as a Multi-Platinum record, having sold three million copies in the United States at that time. It is ranked at No. 206 in the 2003 list of "Rolling Stone's 500 Greatest Albums of All Time".

After his relationship with D'Arbanville ended, Stevens noted the effect it had on his writing, saying, "Everything I wrote while I was away was in a transitional period and reflects that. Like Patti. A year ago we split; I had been with her for two years. What I write about Patti and my family... when I sing the songs now, I learn strange things. I learn the meanings of my songs late ..."

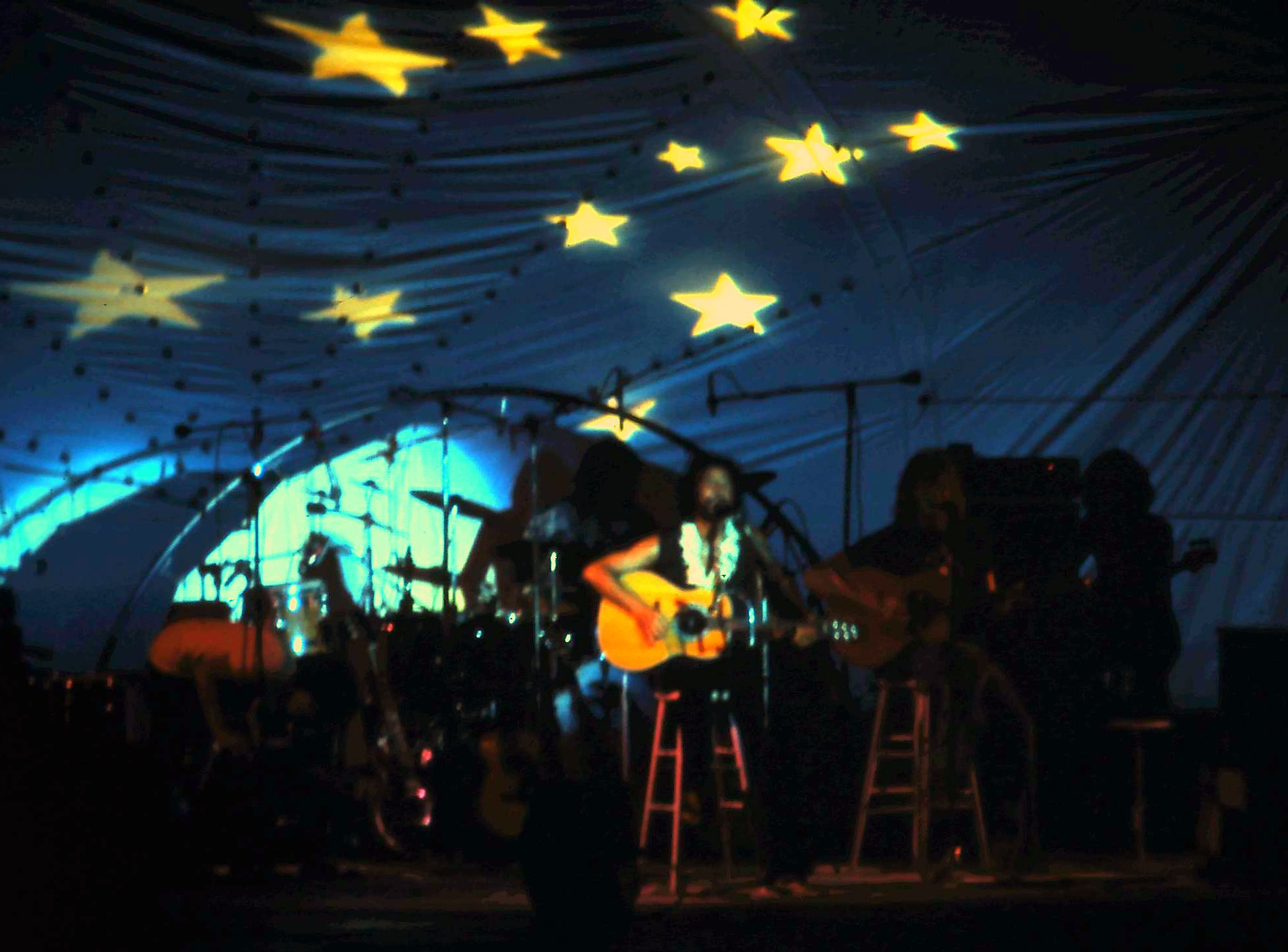
Stevens performing in Waikiki Shell, Oahu, Hawaii, 1974. The stage decor reflects his song "Boy with a Moon & Star on His Head" from Catch Bull at Four.

Having established a signature sound, Stevens enjoyed a string of successes in the following years. 1971's Teaser and the Firecat album reached number two and achieved gold record status within three weeks of its release in the United States. It yielded several hits, including "Peace Train", "Morning Has Broken", and "Moonshadow". The album was also certified by the RIAA as a Multi-Platinum record in 2001, with over three million sold in the United States through that time. When interviewed on a Boston radio station, Stevens said about Teaser and the Firecat:

I get the tune and then I just keep on singing the tune until the words come out from the tune. It's kind of a hypnotic state that you reach after a while when you keep on playing it where words just evolve from it. So you take those words and just let them go whichever way they want ...'Moonshadow'? Funny, that was in Spain, I went there alone, completely alone, to get away from a few things. And I was dancin' on the rocks there ... right on the rocks where the waves were, like, blowin' and splashin'. Really, it was so fantastic. And the moon was bright, ya know, and I started dancin' and singin' and I sang that song and it stayed. It's just the kind of moment that you want to find when you're writin' songs.

For seven months, in 1971 and 1972, Stevens was romantically linked to popular singer Carly Simon, while both were being produced by Samwell-Smith. During that time, they each wrote songs for, and about, one another. Simon wrote and recorded at least two Top 50 songs, "Legend in Your Own Time" and "Anticipation" about Stevens. He reciprocated with a song to her, written after their romance, titled "Sweet Scarlet".

His next album, Catch Bull at Four, released in 1972, was his most rapidly successful album in the United States, reaching gold record status in 15 days and holding the number-one position for three weeks on the Billboard 200 and fifteen weeks at number one in the Australian ARIA Charts.

==== Film and television soundtracks ====
In July 1970, Stevens recorded one of his songs, "But I Might Die Tonight", for the Jerzy Skolimowski film Deep End. He contributed two songs to the 1971 film Harold and Maude, but was annoyed when director Hal Ashby decided to use the original demos instead of allowing Stevens to finish them. The film used seven other Stevens songs as well but, perhaps because of the dispute, the soundtrack album was not released until 2007.

After his religious conversion in the late 1970s, Stevens stopped granting permission for his songs to be used in films. However, almost 20 years later, in 1997, the film Rushmore received his permission to use his songs "Here Comes My Baby" and "The Wind"; this showed a new willingness on his part to release music from his Western "pop star" days. In 2000, "Peace Train" was included in the movie Remember the Titans, and Almost Famous used the song "The Wind". In 2006, "Peace Train" was featured in the soundtrack to We Are Marshall. In 2023, “The Wind” was included in the film Are You There God? It's Me, Margaret., the film adaptation of the 1970 novel with the same name.

==== Negative reception of Foreigner ====
Subsequent releases in the 1970s also did well on the charts and in ongoing sales, although they did not touch the success Stevens had from 1970 to 1973. In 1973, Stevens moved to Rio de Janeiro, Brazil, as a tax exile from the United Kingdom; however, he later donated the money he saved in taxes to UNESCO. During that time he created the album Foreigner, which was a departure from the music that had brought him to the height of his fame. It differed in several respects: it was entirely written by Stevens; he dropped his band; and, with the exception of some guitar on the title track and "100 I Dream", he produced the record without the assistance of Samwell-Smith, who had played a large role in catapulting him to fame. Foreigner was not favorably reviewed, with Rolling Stone's Stephen Holden calling it "painful to review" and "difficult to listen to". Reflecting on the album a few months later, Stevens stated:

"I wasn’t really disappointed because I knew before it was released what kind of album it was. The reaction to it more or less fitted in with what I thought would happen. Foreigner was a very necessary album for me. If it wasn’t for Foreigner there would be nothing to relate the new album to. Having a constant sound, like Glen Campbell or someone, bores me silly, so it’s good to have changes. It’s mysterious, and I like mysteries. I don’t know where the hell Foreigner came from anyway. It was exactly what the title said, a foreign record for me. It didn’t fit in with my usual pattern. I don’t want people to judge me by my looks, my appearance or my image, or whatever I manage to get across, but by the music. Maybe that’s why I put out Foreigner, to have a break from the predictable."

=== 1974–1978: Later recordings ===
==== Buddha and the Chocolate Box, Greatest Hits, and failure of Numbers ====
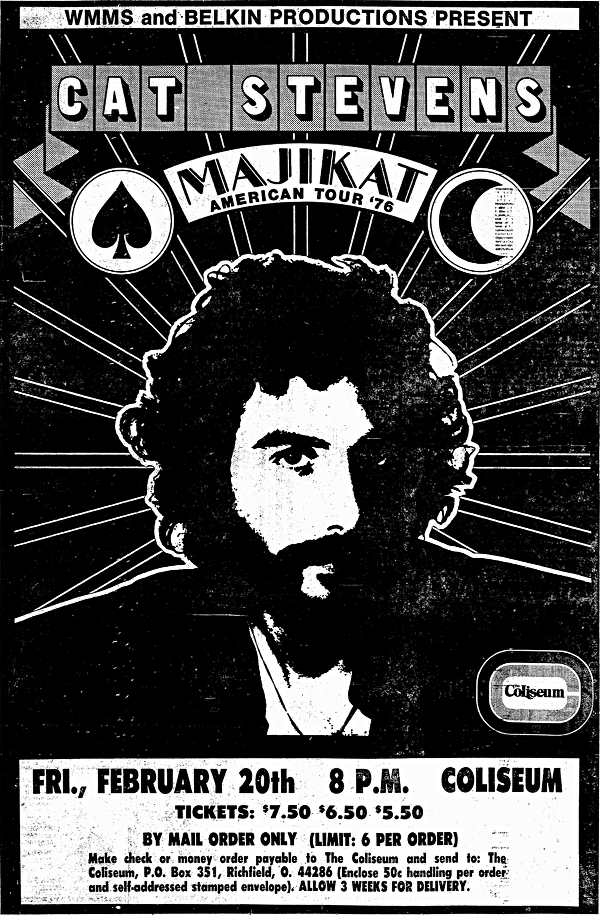
Stevens poster advertising a concert from WMMS in 1976

In June 1974, while in Australia, Stevens was presented with a plaque representing the sale of forty gold records, the largest number ever presented to an artist in Australia.

After the less-than-satisfactory performance of Foreigner, Buddha and the Chocolate Box returned to the acoustic-folk style that gave Stevens success in earlier years. The album also showed Stevens's deepening interest in spirituality, with songs like "Jesus", as well as the album title, which came from an experience on a trip when he found himself carrying a Buddha statue in one hand, and a box of chocolates in the other. He reflected that if he had crashed, he would be between two objects, one representing the material and one the spiritual. The album reached the top 3 in both US and UK charts.

Stevens released a compilation album called Greatest Hits in 1975, which has since sold over 4 million copies in the United States. It contained one new song, "Two Fine People", as well as Stevens's cover of "Another Saturday Night", which had been released the previous year.

Cat Stevens performing a concert in California during his 1976 Majikat tour

Stevens released the album Numbers in 1975, its concept was inspired by the teachings of Pythagoras, which were revealed to Stevens by a woman named Hestia Lovejoy. The album was not well received and considered a failure, not even charting in the UK. Rolling Stone's Paul Nelson called the album "breathtakingly stupid". As a result of its poor performance, by the late 1980s, Numbers was the only album of Stevens's catalog not issued on CD. It finally received a CD issue in 1994.

==== Jam session with Ringo Starr and final "Cat Stevens" albums ====
"(Remember the Days of the) Old Schoolyard" (1977)
Sample of "(Remember the Days of the) Old Schoolyard" from Izitso. It was an early example of synthpop and his last top 40 hit single of the 1970s.

"Was Dog a Doughnut?" (1977)
Sample of "Was Dog a Doughnut?" from Izitso. It was one of the first examples of electro, or techno-pop.

By chance, on 30 September 1976, Stevens met Ringo Starr, former drummer of The Beatles. The Beatles had been a major influence on Stevens and his music. Stevens invited Starr down to the studio where Stevens was recording his forthcoming album Izitso. However, Starr struggled with the "odd timings" of "(Remember the Days of the) Old Schoolyard", leading Stevens to move away from the album and jam instead with Starr. This session has yet to be officially released, however bootleg copies exist.

In April 1977, his Izitso album was released, updating his pop rock and folk rock style with the extensive use of synthesisers, as well as giving it a more synthpop style. "Was Dog a Doughnut?", in particular, was an early techno-pop fusion track and a precursor to the 1980s electro music genre, making early use of a music sequencer. Izitso included his last chart hit, "(Remember the Days of the) Old Schoolyard", an early synthpop song that used a polyphonic synthesiser; it was a duet with fellow UK singer Elkie Brooks.

His final original album under the name Cat Stevens was Back to Earth, released in late 1978. It was also the first album produced by Samwell-Smith since the peak in Stevens's single album sales in the early 1970s. As he was unwilling to promote Back to Earth with a tour, it peaked at only No. 33 on the Billboard charts.

Several compilation albums were released before and after he stopped recording.

=== 1978–1979: Leaving the music industry ===
After a long search for spiritual truth, Stevens's brother, David Gordon, gave him a copy of the Qur'an. On 23 December 1977, he entered the Regent's Park Mosque in London and formally embraced Islam, and in 1978 he took the name Yusuf Islam. (Note: Main section: Religious conversion) Following his conversion, Islam abandoned his musical career for nearly two decades. When he became a Muslim in 1977, the imam at his mosque told him that it was fine to continue as a musician, as long as the songs were morally acceptable. However, because others said that "it was all prohibited,” he decided to avoid the question by ceasing to perform. He has said that there was "a combination of reasons, really", and that the continuing demands of the music business had been "becoming a chore, and not an inspiration anymore".

In 1979, although he discontinued his pop career, he was persuaded to perform one last time before what became a 25-year musical hiatus. Appearing with his hair freshly shorn and an untrimmed beard, he headlined a charity concert on 22 November 1979 in Wembley Stadium to benefit UNICEF's International Year of the Child. The concert closed with his performance along with David Essex, Alun Davies, and Islam's brother, David Gordon, who wrote the finale song "Child for a Day".

He told an Islamic magazine in 1980:

"I have suspended my activities in music for fear that they may divert me from the true path, but I will not be dogmatic in saying that I will never make music again. You can’t say that without adding, ‘Insha Allah’ (if God Wishes)."

The following year, he sold almost all of his musical gear to Bonham's auction house.

=== 1990s–2006: Islamic music and other recordings as Yusuf Islam ===
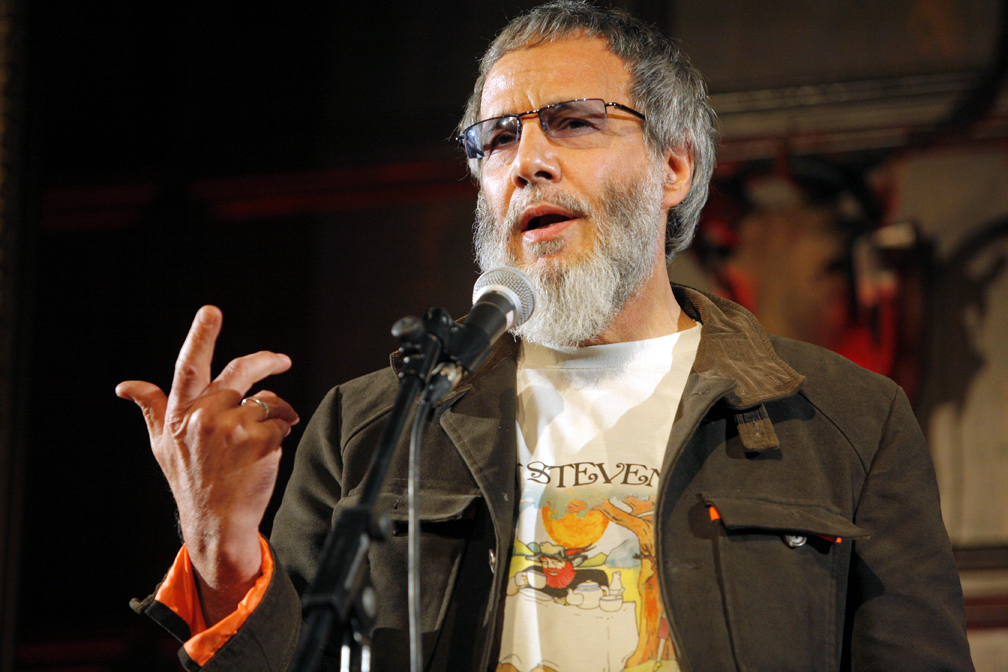
Yusuf Islam at the 2009 MOJO Awards in London

==== Early Islamic recordings ====
Islam gradually resumed his musical career in the 1990s. These initial recordings did not include any musical instruments other than percussion, and they featured lyrics about Islamic themes, some in spoken word or hamd form. He invested in building his own recording studio, which he named Mountain of Light Studios in the late 1990s, and he was featured as a guest singer on "God Is the Light", a song on an album of nasheeds by the group Raihan. In addition, he invited and collaborated with other Muslim singers, including Canadian artist Dawud Wharnsby.

After Islam's friend Irfan Ljubijankić, the Foreign Minister of Bosnia and Herzegovina, was killed by a Serbian rocket attack, Islam appeared at a 1997 benefit concert in Sarajevo and recorded a benefit album named after a song written by Ljubijankić, I Have No Cannons That Roar.

Realising there were few educational resources designed to teach children about the Islamic religion, Islam wrote and produced a children's album, A Is for Allah, in 2000 with the assistance of South African singer-songwriter Zain Bhikha. The title song was one Islam had written years before to introduce his first child to both the religion and the Arabic alphabet. He also established his own record label, "Jamal Records", and Mountain of Light Productions, and he donates a percentage of his projects' proceeds to his Small Kindness charity, whose name is taken from the Qur'an.

==== Response to the 11 September attacks and singing "Peace Train" again ====
Immediately following the September 11 attacks on the United States, he said:

I wish to express my heartfelt horror at the indiscriminate terrorist attacks committed against innocent people of the United States yesterday. While it is still not clear who carried out the attack, it must be stated that no right-thinking follower of Islam could possibly condone such an action. The Qur'an equates the murder of one innocent person with the murder of the whole of humanity. We pray for the families of all those who lost their lives in this unthinkable act of violence as well as all those injured; I hope to reflect the feelings of all Muslims and people around the world whose sympathies go out to the victims of this sorrowful moment.

Islam appeared on videotape on a VH1 pre-show for the October 2001 Concert for New York City, condemning the attacks and singing his song "Peace Train" for the first time in public in more than 20 years, as an a cappella version. He also donated a portion of his box-set royalties to the fund for victims' families and the rest to orphans in underdeveloped countries. During the same year, he joined the Forum Against Islamophobia and Racism, an organisation that worked towards battling misconceptions and acts against others because of their religious beliefs or their racial identity (or both), after many Muslims reported a backlash against them due in part to the grief caused by the events in the United States on 11 September.

==== Reflecting on leaving the music industry and other recordings ====
On the occasion of the 2000 re-release of his Cat Stevens albums, at the urging of his label rep Sujata, Islam agreed to interviews with the media to tell his story and reconnect with his fans. Islam explained that he had stopped performing in English due to his misunderstanding of the Islamic faith. "This issue of music in Islam is not as cut-and-dried as I was led to believe ... I relied on heresy, that was perhaps my mistake." He also participated in the first documentary on his life for a two-part VH1 Behind the Music.

Islam has reflected that his decision to leave the Western pop-music business was perhaps too quick with too little communication for his fans. For most it was a surprise, and even his long-time guitarist Alun Davies said in later interviews that he had not believed that his friend would actually go through with it after his many forays into other religions throughout their relationship. Islam himself has said the "cut" between his former life and his life as a Muslim might have been too quick, and too severe, and that more people might have been better informed about Islam, and given an opportunity to better understand it, and himself, if he had simply removed those items that were considered harām, in his performances, allowing him to express himself musically and educate listeners through his music without violating any religious constraints.

In 2003, after repeated encouragement from within the Muslim world, Islam once again recorded "Peace Train" for a compilation CD, which also included performances by David Bowie and Paul McCartney. He performed "Wild World" in Nelson Mandela's 46664 concert with his earlier collaborator, Peter Gabriel, the first time he had publicly performed in English in 25 years. In May of that same year, he received his first Platinum Europe Award from the IFPI for Remember Cat Stevens: The Ultimate Collection, indicating over one million European sales.

In a 2004 interview on Larry King Live, he said "A lot of people would have loved me to keep singing. You come to a point where you have sung, more or less... your whole repertoire and you want to get down to the job of living. You know, up until that point, I hadn't had a life. I'd been searching, been on the road."

In December 2004, he and Ronan Keating released a new version of "Father and Son": the song entered the charts at number two, behind Band Aid 20's "Do They Know It's Christmas?" They also produced a video of the pair walking between photographs of fathers and sons, while singing the song. The proceeds of "Father and Son" were donated to the Band Aid charity. Keating's former group, Boyzone, had a hit with the song a decade earlier. As he had been persuaded before, Islam contributed to the song, because the proceeds were marked for charity.

On 21 April 2005, Islam gave a short talk before a scheduled musical performance in Abu Dhabi, United Arab Emirates, on the anniversary of the prophet Muhammad's birthday. He said:

There is a great deal of ignorance in the world about Islam today, and we hope to communicate with the help of something more refined than lectures and talks. Our recordings are particularly appealing to the young, having used songs as well as Qur'an verses with pleasing sound effects ...

Islam observed that there are no real guidelines about instruments and no references about the business of music in the Qur'an, and that Muslim travellers first brought the guitar to Moorish Spain. He noted that Muhammad was fond of celebrations, as in the case of the birth of a child, or a traveller arriving after a long journey. Thus, Islam concluded that healthy entertainment was acceptable within limitations, and that he now felt that it was no sin to perform with the guitar. Music, he now felt, is uplifting to the soul; something sorely needed in troubled times. At that point, he was joined by several young male singers who sang backing vocals and played a drum, with Islam as lead singer and guitarist. They performed two songs, both half in Arabic and half in English; "Tala'a Al-Badru Alayna", an old song in Arabic which Islam recorded with a folk sound to it, and another song, "The Wind East and West", which was newly written by Islam and featured a distinct R&B sound.

With this performance, Islam began slowly to integrate instruments into both older material from his Cat Stevens era (some with slight lyrical changes) and new songs, both those known to the Muslim communities around the world and some that have the same Western flair from before with a focus on new topics and another generation of listeners.

In a 2005 press release, he explained his revived recording career:

After I embraced Islam, many people told me to carry on composing and recording, but at the time I was hesitant, for fear that it might be for the wrong reasons. I felt unsure what the right course of action was. I guess it is only now, after all these years, that I've come to fully understand and appreciate what everyone has been asking of me. It's as if I've come full circle; however, I have gathered a lot of knowledge on the subject in the meantime.

In Islam there is something called the principle of common good. What that means is that whenever one is confronted by something that is not mentioned in the scriptures, one must observe what benefit it can bring. Does it serve the common good, does it protect the spirit, and does it serve God? If the scholars see that it is something positive, they may well approve of what I'm doing.

— Yusuf Islam

In early 2005, Islam released a new song, titled "Indian Ocean", about the 2004 Indian Ocean earthquake and tsunami disaster. The song featured Indian composer/producer A. R. Rahman, a-ha keyboard player Magne Furuholmen and Travis drummer Neil Primrose. Proceeds of the single went to help orphans in Banda Aceh, one of the areas worst affected by the tsunami, through Islam's Small Kindness charity. At first, the single was released only through several digital music stores but later featured on the compilation album Cat Stevens: Gold. "I had to learn my faith and look after my family, and I had to make priorities. But now I've done it all and there's a little space for me to fill in the universe of music again."

On 28 May 2005, Islam delivered a keynote speech and performed at the Adopt-A-Minefield Gala in Düsseldorf. The Adopt-A-Minefield charity, under the patronage of Paul McCartney, works internationally to raise awareness and funds to clear landmines and rehabilitate landmine survivors. Islam attended as part of an honorary committee which also included George Martin, Richard Branson, Boutros Boutros-Ghali, Klaus Voormann, Christopher Lee and others.

In mid-2005, Islam played guitar for the Dolly Parton album Those Were the Days on her version of his "Where Do the Children Play?" (Parton had also covered "Peace Train" a few years earlier.)

Most of the Islamic music Islam recorded between 1984 and 2004 was re-released in a 2006 compilation titled Footsteps in the Light.

Islam has credited his then 21-year-old son Muhammad Islam, also a musician and artist, for his return to secular music, when the son brought a guitar back into the house, which Islam began playing. Muhammad's professional name is Yoriyos and his debut album was released in November 2007.

=== 2006–2008: Return to secular music with An Other Cup ===
==== Releasing and promoting An Other Cup ====
In March 2006, Islam finished recording his first all-new pop album since 1978, titled An Other Cup. In May 2006, in anticipation of his forthcoming album, the BBC1 programme Imagine aired a 49-minute documentary with Alan Yentob called Yusuf: The Artist formerly Known as Cat Stevens. This documentary film features rare audio and video clips from the late 1960s and 1970s, as well as an extensive interview with Islam, his brother David Gordon, several record executives, Bob Geldof, Dolly Parton, and others outlining his career as Cat Stevens, his conversion and emergence as Yusuf Islam, and his return to music in 2006. There are clips of him singing in the studio when he was recording An Other Cup as well as a few 2006 excerpts of him on guitar singing a few verses of Cat Stevens songs including "The Wind" and "On the Road to Find Out".

An Other Cup, was released internationally in November 2006 on his own label, Ya Records (distributed by Polydor Records in the UK, and internationally by Atlantic Records)—the 40th anniversary of his first album, Matthew and Son. An accompanying single, called "Heaven/Where True Love Goes", was also released. The album was produced with Rick Nowels, who has worked with Dido and Rod Stewart. The performer is noted as "Yusuf", with a cover label identifying him as "the artist formerly known as Cat Stevens". Yoriyos created the art for the album, something that Islam did for his own albums in the 1970s. Islam wrote all of the songs except "Don't Let Me Be Misunderstood", and recorded it in the United States and the United Kingdom.

Islam actively promoted this album, appearing on radio, television and in print interviews. In November 2006, he told the BBC, "It's me, so it's going to sound like that of course ... This is the real thing ... When my son brought the guitar back into the house, you know, that was the turning point. It opened a flood of, of new ideas and music which I think a lot of people would connect with." Originally, he began to return only to his acoustic guitar as he had in the past, but his son encouraged him to "experiment", which resulted in the purchase of a Stevie Ray Vaughan Fender Stratocaster in 2007.

Also in November 2006, Billboard magazine was curious as to why the artist is credited as just his first name, "Yusuf" rather than "Yusuf Islam". His response was "Because 'Islam' doesn't have to be sloganised. The second name is like the official tag, but you call a friend by their first name. It's more intimate, and to me that's the message of this record." As for why the album sleeve says "the artist formerly known as Cat Stevens", he responded, "That's the tag with which most people are familiar; for recognition purposes I'm not averse to that. For a lot of people, it reminds them of something they want to hold on to. That name is part of my history and a lot of the things I dreamt about as Cat Stevens have come true as Yusuf Islam."

Islam was asked by the Swiss periodical Das Magazin why the title of the album was An Other Cup, rather than "Another Cup". The answer was that his breakthrough album, Tea for the Tillerman in 1970, was decorated with Islam's painting of a peasant sitting down to a cup of steaming drink on the land. He commented that the two worlds "then, and now, are very different". His new album shows a steaming cup alone on this cover. His answer was that this was actually an other cup; something different; a bridge between the East and West, which he explained was his own perceived role. He added that, through him, "Westerners might get a glimpse of the East, and Easterners, some understanding of the West. The cup, too, is important; it's a meeting place, a thing meant to be shared."

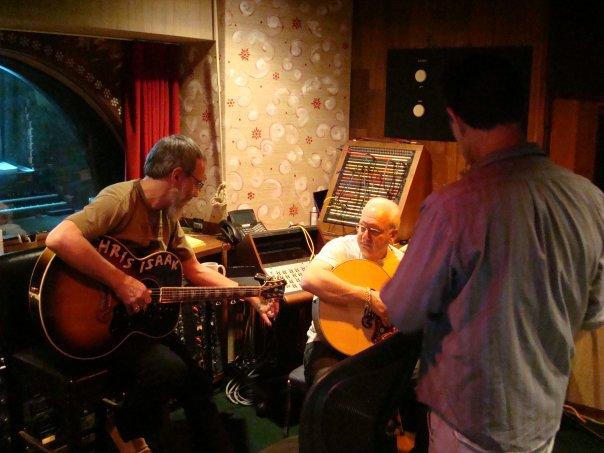
Islam working with David Spero in Los Angeles

On CBS Sunday Morning in December 2006, he said, "You know, the cup is there to be filled ... with whatever you want to fill it with. For those people looking for Cat Stevens, they'll probably find him in this record. If you want to find [Yusuf] Islam, go a bit deeper, you'll find him."

==== Performing live and touring again ====
In December 2006, Islam was one of the artists who performed at the Nobel Peace Prize Concert in Oslo, Norway, in honour of the prize winners, Muhammad Yunus and Grameen Bank. He performed the songs "Midday (Avoid City After Dark)", "Peace Train", and "Heaven/Where True Love Goes". He also gave a concert in New York City that month as a Jazz at Lincoln Center event, recorded and broadcast by KCRW-FM radio, along with an interview by Nic Harcourt. Accompanying him, as in the Cat Stevens days, was Alun Davies, on guitar and vocals.

In April 2007, BBC1 broadcast a concert given at the Porchester Hall by Islam as part of BBC Sessions, his first live performance in London in 28 years (the previous one being the UNICEF "Year of the Child" concert in 1979). He played several new songs along with some old ones like "Father and Son", "The Wind", "Where Do the Children Play?", "Don't Be Shy", "Wild World", and "Peace Train".

In July 2007, he performed at a concert in Bochum, Germany, in benefit of Archbishop Desmond Tutu's Peace Centre in South Africa and the Milagro Foundation of Deborah and Carlos Santana. The audience included Nobel Laureates Mikhail Gorbachev, Desmond Tutu and other prominent global figures. He later appeared as the final act in the German leg of Live Earth in Hamburg performing some classic Cat Stevens songs and more recent compositions reflecting his concern for peace and child welfare. His set included Stevie Wonder's "Saturn", "Peace Train", "Where Do the Children Play?", "Ruins", and "Wild World". He performed at the Peace One Day concert at the Royal Albert Hall on 21 September 2007. Islam also contributed the song "Edge of Existence" to the charity album Songs for Survival, in support of the indigenous rights organisation Survival International.

=== 2009–2014: Roadsinger, "My People" and tours ===
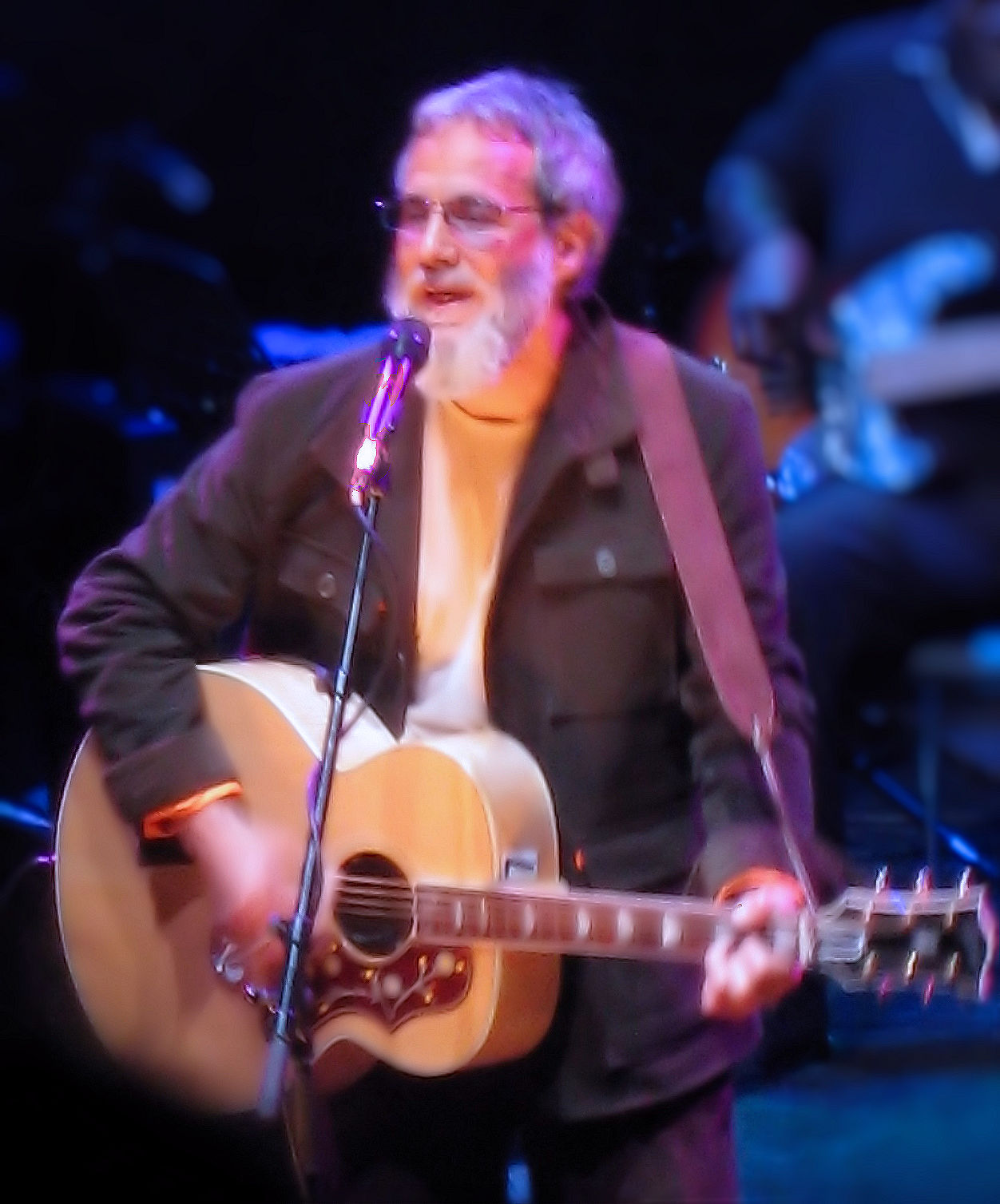
Islam performing at Shepherd's Bush Empire, London, May 2009

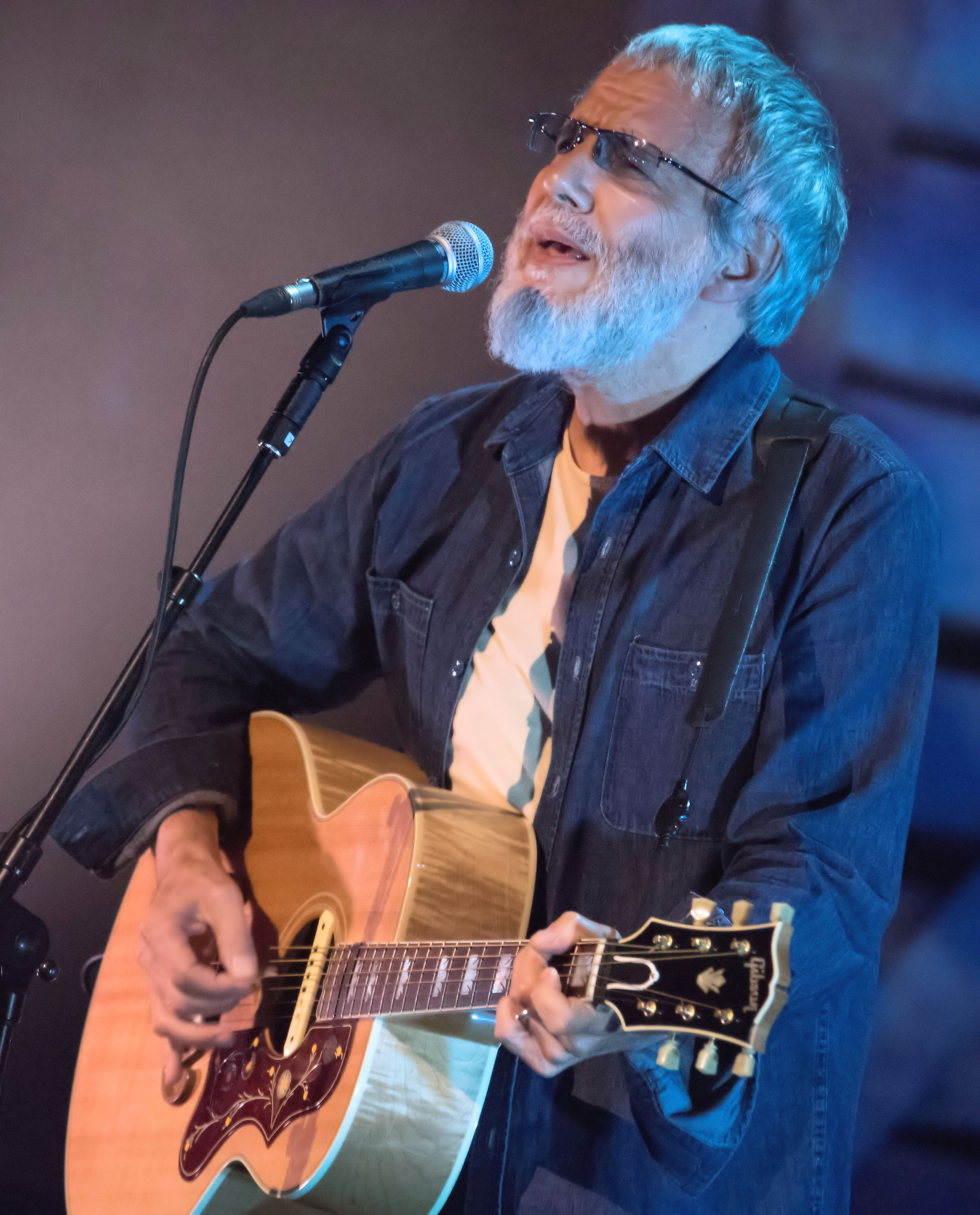
Yusuf performing at the BBC Radio 2 Folk Awards, Cardiff in 2015

In January 2009, Islam released a single in aid of children in Gaza, a rendition of the George Harrison song "The Day the World Gets 'Round", along with the German bassist Klaus Voormann, who had formerly collaborated with The Beatles. To promote the new single, Voormann redesigned his famous Beatles Revolver album cover, drawing a picture of a young Cat Stevens along with himself and Harrison. Proceeds from the single were donated to charities and organisations including UNESCO, UNRWA, and the nonprofit group Save the Children, with the funds earmarked for Gaza children. Israeli Consul David Saranga criticised Islam for not dedicating the song to all of the children who are victims of the conflict, including Israeli children.

On 5 May 2009, Islam released Roadsinger, a new pop album recorded in 2008. The lead track, "Thinking 'Bout You", received its debut radio play on a BBC programme on 23 March 2009. Unlike An Other Cup, he promoted the new album with appearances on American television as well as in the UK. He appeared on The Chris Isaak Hour on the A&E Network in April 2009, performing live versions of his new songs, "World O'Darkness", "Boots and Sand", and "Roadsinger". On 13 May he appeared on The Tonight Show with Jay Leno in Los Angeles, and on 14 May, on The Colbert Report in New York City, performing the title song from the Roadsinger album. On 15 May, he appeared on Late Night with Jimmy Fallon, performing "Boots and Sand" and "Father and Son". On 24 May he appeared on the BBC's The Andrew Marr Show, where he was interviewed and performed the title track of Roadsinger. On 15 August, he was one of many guests at Fairport Convention's annual Fairport's Cropredy Convention where he performed five songs accompanied by Alun Davies, with Fairport Convention as his backing band.

A world tour was announced on his web site to promote the new album. He was scheduled to perform at an invitation-only concert at New York City's Highline Ballroom on 3 May 2009 and to go on to Los Angeles, Chicago and Toronto, as well as some to-be-announced European venues. However, the New York appearance was postponed due to issues regarding his work visa. He appeared in May 2009 at Island Records' 50th Anniversary concert in London. In November and December 2009, Islam undertook his "Guess I'll Take My Time Tour" which also showcased his musical play Moonshadow. The tour took him to Dublin, where he had a mixed reception; subsequently he was well received in Birmingham and Liverpool, culminating in an emotional performance at the Royal Albert Hall in London.

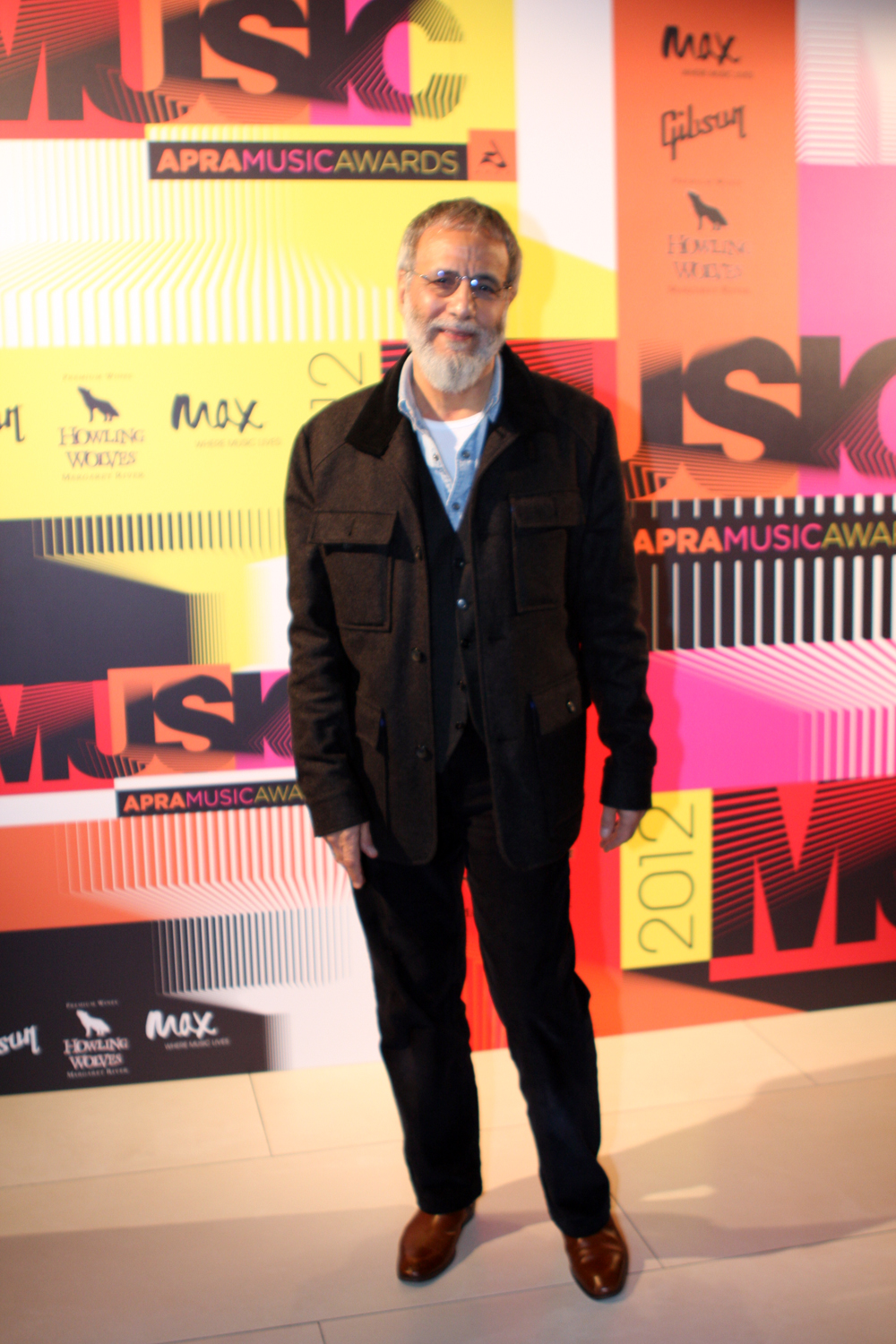
Yusuf at the 2012 APRA Music Awards in Sydney

After the death of American pop singer Michael Jackson in June 2009, Islam released a tribute song for Jackson, titled "He's Gone". The song featured his son's band Noxshi. Islam also sent his condolences in a tribute message, calling Jackson "a giant of a musician", but with "the heart of a child". The year prior, press rumors had circulated reporting Jackson's conversion to Islam, also reporting Yusuf Islam's presence at the ceremony. Islam had issued a statement denying the rumors, stating he had been filming a music video at the time.

In June 2010 he toured Australia for the first time in 36 years, and New Zealand for the first time ever, the former alongside Noxshi.

On 30 October 2010, Islam appeared at Jon Stewart and Stephen Colbert's spoof Rally to Restore Sanity and/or Fear in Washington, DC, singing alongside Ozzy Osbourne. Yusuf performed "Peace Train" and Ozzy performed "Crazy Train" at the same time, followed by The O'Jays performance of "Love Train".

On 2 March 2011, Islam released his latest song, "My People", as a free download available through his official website, as well as numerous other online outlets. Said to have been recorded at a studio located within a hundred yards of the site of the Berlin Wall, the song is inspired by a series of popular uprisings in the Arab world, known as the Arab Spring.

On 1 April 2011, he launched a new tour website (yusufinconcert.com) to commemorate his first European tour in over 36 years, scheduled from 7 May to 2 June 2011. The ten-date tour visited Germany, France, the Netherlands, Austria, Belgium and cities such as Stockholm, Hamburg, Oberhausen, Berlin, Munich, Rotterdam, Paris, Mannheim, Vienna and Brussels.

In May 2012, Moonshadow, a new musical featuring music from throughout his career, opened at the Princess Theatre in Melbourne, Australia. The show received mixed reviews and closed four weeks early.

In October 2013, Islam was nominated for induction into the Rock and Roll Hall of Fame for his work under the Cat Stevens name (this was his second nomination – the first being an unsuccessful nomination in 2005). He was selected and was inducted by Art Garfunkel in April 2014 at the Barclays Center in Brooklyn, New York, where he performed "Father and Son", "Wild World", and "Peace Train". A record of his travel from Dubai to New York is captured in an episode of the National Geographic Channel television show Ultimate Airport Dubai (season 2, episode 6), first aired in China on 17 January 2015. In this episode he talks about his difficulty in entering the US.

=== 2014–2017: Tell 'Em I'm Gone, "He Was Alone" and tours ===
On 15 September 2014, Islam announced the forthcoming release on 27 October 2014 of his new studio album, Tell 'Em I'm Gone, and two short tours: a November 2014 (9-date) Europe tour and a December 2014 (6-date) North America tour, the latter being his first one since 1976. On 4 December 2014, he played to his first public US audience since the 1970s at the Tower Theater in Philadelphia.

Islam performed two shows in early 2015: on 27 February at the Viña del Mar Festival, Quinta Vergara, Viña del Mar, Chile and on 22 April at the Wales Millennium Centre in Cardiff Bay, area of Cardiff, Wales.

On 1 June 2016, Islam shared a new song called "He Was Alone" and its corresponding video. Part of his newly launched fundraising campaign for child refugees, #YouAreNotAlone, the song was inspired by a trip to southern Turkey's camps for Syrian refugees. He performed the song live for the first time in a special charity concert, his first show in more than a year, on 14 June 2016 at the Westminster Central Hall in London.

On 26 July 2016, Islam announced he would be part of the Global Citizen Festival held on 24 September 2016 in Central Park, New York, New York.

On 9 August 2016, Islam announced "A Cat's Attic Tour", his second North American tour since 1978, beginning on 12 September 2016 at the Sony Centre for the Performing Arts in Toronto and ending on 7 October 2016 at the Pantages Theatre in Los Angeles. The string of 12 dates roughly coincides with the 50th anniversary of his first single, "I Love My Dog", and would "feature a limited run of stripped down, introspective performances." The tour included three shows in New York City (two shows at the Beacon Theatre and one show in Central Park at the Global Citizen Festival), his first shows in New York City since 1976. In keeping with his spirit of humanitarianism, he would be donating a portion of the revenue from each ticket sale towards his charity Small Kindness, as well as UNICEF and the International Rescue Committee in an effort to assist children affected by the current Syrian refugee crisis. The tour continued in the UK with shows in Manchester, Glasgow, Newcastle and London. The London show took place at the Shaftesbury Theatre, only a block away from where he grew up.

=== 2017–2024: The Laughing Apple, TT2, Glastonbury, and King of a Land ===
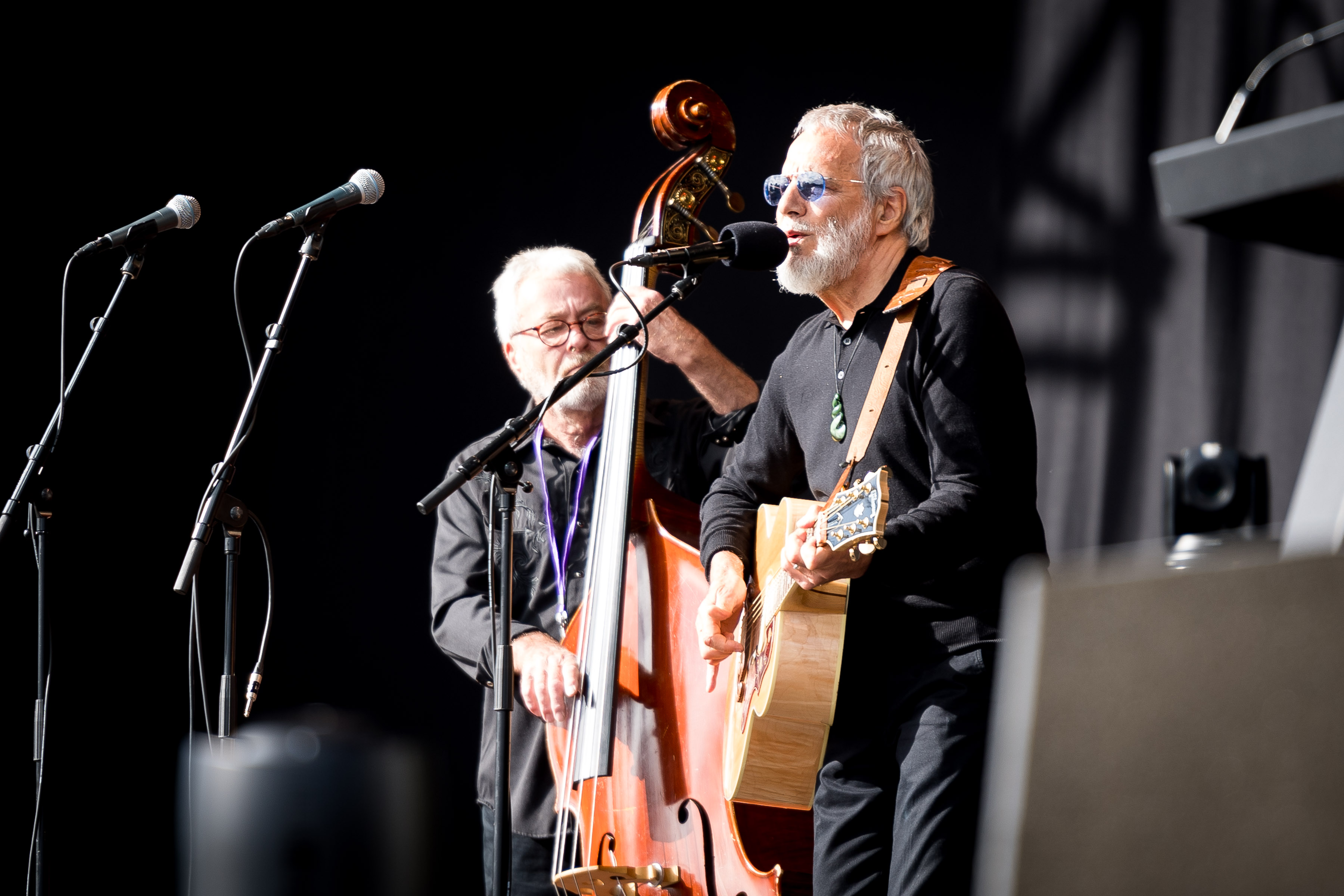
Islam performing "Peace Train" at the National Remembrance Service for victims of the Christchurch mosque shootings, in Hagley Park, Christchurch, on 29 March 2019

On 15 September 2017, he released his fifteenth studio album, The Laughing Apple. The album is credited to "Yusuf / Cat Stevens" and is his first record under the Cat Stevens name since Back to Earth in 1978. The album earned him his first nomination for a Grammy Award for Best Folk Album. In July 2018, Islam signed with BMG Rights Management, which will publish his songwriting credits worldwide and distribute nine of his studio albums. On 29 March 2019, Islam performed in Christchurch, New Zealand, at the National Remembrance Service for victims of the Christchurch mosque shootings.

On 3 March 2020, Islam played the Music for the Marsden benefit concert at the O2 Arena in London. On 28 May 2020, Islam announced his next album, Tea for the Tillerman 2, and it was released on 18 September 2020, celebrating the 50th anniversary of the original LP. Known as TT2, Tea for the Tillerman 2 is a re-imagining and re-recording of the songs from the earlier album, with updated interpretations and arrangements. On 25 September 2020, Islam was the guest on the BBC's Desert Island Discs. Islam is one of a small number of guests that have chosen their own music as a desert island choice, however he picked the Stevie Wonder Motown hit 'As' for his favoured choice in front of his own recording, if only one could be saved.

Teaming up with Playing for Change, in 2021 Yusuf / Cat Stevens recorded a new version of "Peace Train" with over 25 musicians from 12 countries.

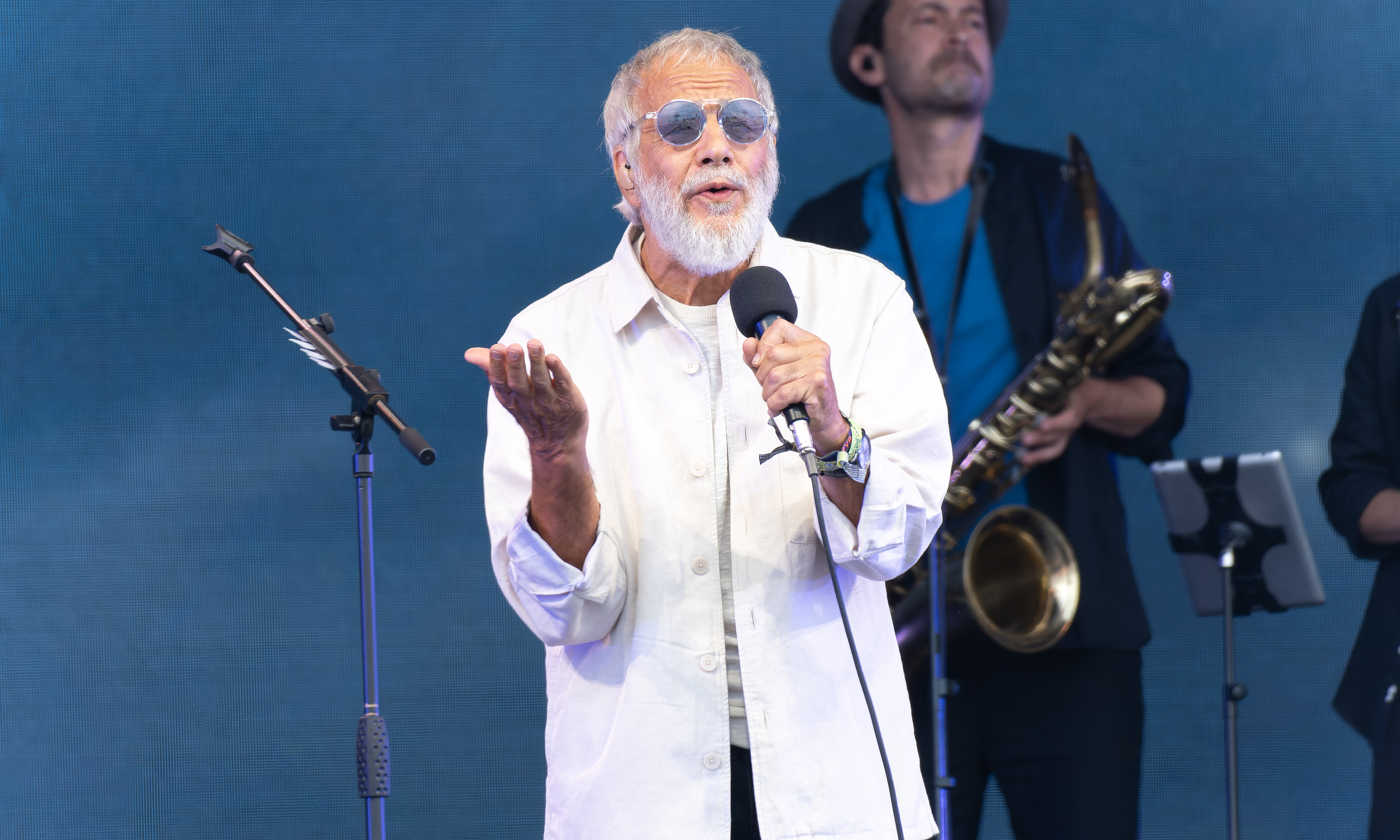
Islam performing on the Pyramid Stage at Glastonbury in 2023

In June 2023, Islam performed shows in Berlin, Hamburg, Rome, Marbella, and made his first appearance at Glastonbury Festival: on 25 June 2023, he played the Pyramid Stage, performing songs including several hits and some covers of iconic Beatles tracks. (Note: On 12 June 2023 at Citadel Music Festival 2023, Zitadelle Spandau, Berlin, Germany; on 15 June in Hamburg, Germany; on 18 June at Auditorium Parco della Musica Ennio Morricone, Rome, Italy; on 21 June at Starlite Festival, Marbella, Spain; on 25 June 2023 at the Pyramid Stage, Glastonbury Festival, Pilton, UK (15:15–16:30).)

On 16 June 2023, he released King of a Land, a new studio album with children's music and religious music influences. Reader's Digest editors featured it in their list of the year's best albums, and AllMusic editors included this among their favorite singer-songwriter music albums of 2023.

=== 2025-present: Cat on the Road to Find Out, US visa issues, and other appearances ===
Islam was one of the 1000 musicians credited on Is This What We Want?, an album consisting of ambient noise protesting the use of copyrighted work to train artificial intelligence. The album's profits went towards the UK charity Help Musicians.

In October 2025, Islam released his official autobiography Cat on the Road to Findout. In his review of the book for The Guardian newspaper, Alexis Petridis said of Islam: "He seems happy, ending his story with a poem that opens 'when I was a little foetus'. Whatever you make of that, it reads remarkably like one of the more wide-eyed lyrics from his heyday. Yusuf Islam has been on quite a journey, but some things never change."

A greatest hits compilation was released alongside the book.

A book tour had been planned in support of the autobiography. In September 2025, it was announced that the North American leg of the tour had been cancelled as a result of unspecified visa issues.

In 2026, on his 78th birthday, Islam visited Sweden, where his mother was from, to perform live at 2026's Allsång på Skansen concert during the fifth program.

== Legacy ==
Artists who have cited Stevens as a musical influence and lauded the quality of his music include Paul McCartney of The Beatles, Dolly Parton, Ian Anderson of Jethro Tull, Lindsey Buckingham of Fleetwood Mac, John Frusciante of the Red Hot Chili Peppers, Peter Gabriel, Nile Rodgers of CHIC, Carly Simon, Rick Wakeman, Paul Rodgers of the bands Free and Bad Company, Bonnie "Prince" Billy, Dale Crover of The Melvins, James Morrison, and Ville Valo of HIM.

== Philanthropic work ==
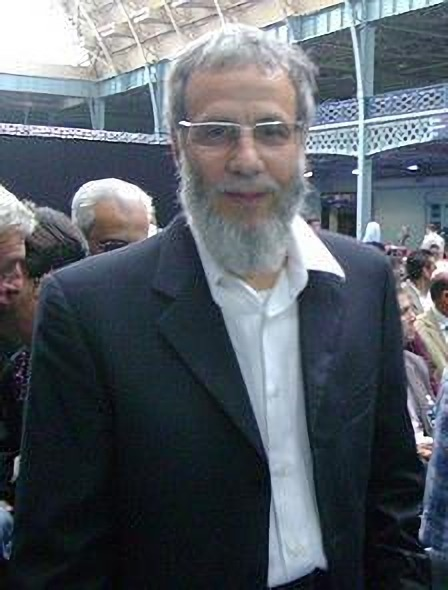
Yusuf Islam appearing at the Islam Expo in London (2008)

Estimating in January 2007 that he was continuing to earn approximately US$1.5 million a year from his Cat Stevens music, Islam said he would use his accumulated wealth and ongoing earnings from his music career for philanthropic and educational causes in the Muslim community of London and elsewhere. In 1983, he founded the Islamia Primary School in Brondesbury Park, which later moved to Salusbury Road in the north London area of Queen's Park and, soon after, founded several Muslim secondary schools. In 1992, he set up The Association of Muslim Schools (AMS-UK), a charity that brought together all the Muslim schools in the UK. He is also the founder and chairman of the Small Kindness charity, which initially assisted famine victims in Africa and now supports thousands of orphans and families in the Balkans, Indonesia, and Iraq. He was chairman of the charity Muslim Aid from 1985 to 1993.

== Personal life ==
=== Tuberculosis ===
In 1968, Stevens contracted a nearly fatal bout of tuberculosis. and was close to death at the time of his admission to the King Edward VII Hospital, Midhurst, West Sussex. He spent months recuperating in the hospital and a year of convalescence. During this time, Stevens began to question aspects of his life and spirituality. He later said, "To go from the show business environment and find you are in hospital, getting injections day in and day out, and people around you are dying, it certainly changes your perspective. I got down to thinking about myself. It seemed almost as if I had my eyes shut."

He took up meditation, yoga, and metaphysics, read about other religions and became a vegetarian. As a result of his serious illness and long convalescence and as a part of his spiritual awakening and questioning, he wrote as many as 40 songs, many of which would appear on his albums in later years.

After recovering, he wrote a song called "Trouble", which, with lyrics like "Oh trouble move away...you have made me a wreck, now won't you leave me in my misery..." reference his struggle with tuberculosis.

=== Religious conversion ===
While on holiday in Marrakesh, Stevens was intrigued by the sound of the adhān, the Islamic ritual call to prayer, which was explained to him as "music for God.” Stevens said, "I thought, music for God? I'd never heard that before – I'd heard of music for money, music for fame, music for personal power, but music for God!?"

In 1976, Stevens nearly drowned off the coast of Malibu, California, and said he shouted, "Oh, God! If you save me I will work for you." He stated that, immediately afterwards, a wave appeared and carried him back to shore. This brush with death intensified his long-held quest for spiritual truth. He had looked into "Buddhism, Zen, I Ching, numerology, tarot cards, and astrology". Stevens' brother David Gordon, a convert to Judaism, brought him a copy of the Qur'an as a birthday gift from a trip to Jerusalem.

Stevens said on BBC's Desert Island Discs: "I would never have picked up the Qur'an myself as a free spirit; I was more aligned to my father's Greek Orthodox beliefs." His brother's timely gift was quickly absorbed and he was taken with its content, soon beginning his transition and conversion to Islam, which would change his private and professional life.

As he was studying the Qur'an, Stevens began to identify more and more with the story of Joseph, a man bought and sold in the market place, which was how he said he had increasingly felt within the music business. Regarding his conversion, in his 2006 interview with Alan Yentob, he stated, "To some people, it may have seemed like an enormous jump, but for me, it was a gradual move to this." And, in a Rolling Stone magazine interview, he said, "I had found the spiritual home I'd been seeking for most of my life. And if you listen to my music and lyrics, like ‘Peace Train’ and ‘On The Road To Find Out’, it clearly shows my yearning for direction and the spiritual path I was travelling."

Stevens formally converted to Islam on 23 December 1977, at the Regent's Park Mosque in London. The next year, he changed his name to Yusuf Islam. Yusuf is the Arabic rendition of the name Joseph; he stated that he "always loved the name Joseph" and was particularly drawn to the story of Joseph in the Qur'an.

=== Marriage and family ===
Islam married Fauzia Mubarak Ali on 7 September 1979, at Regent's Park Mosque in London. They have one son, four daughters, and nine grandchildren. A second son died in infancy. They have a home in London while currently preferring to spend a major part of each year in Dubai.

=== 2004 denial of entry into the United States ===
On 21 September 2004, Islam was on a United Airlines flight from London to Washington, travelling to a meeting with American entertainer Dolly Parton, who had recorded "Peace Train" several years earlier and was planning to include another Cat Stevens song on an upcoming album. While the plane was in flight, his name was flagged as being on the No Fly List. Customs and Border Protection (CBP) officers alerted the United States Transportation Security Administration, which then diverted his flight to Bangor, Maine, where he was detained by officers from the Department of Homeland Security.

The following day, he was denied entry and flown back to the United Kingdom. A spokesman for Homeland Security claimed there were "concerns of ties he may have to potential terrorist-related activities". The Israeli government had denied entry to Islam in 2000 over allegations that he provided funding to the Palestinian organisation Hamas, but he denied doing so knowingly. Islam stated "I have never knowingly supported or given money to Hamas". "At the time I was reported to have done it, I didn't know such a group existed. Some people give a political interpretation to charity. We were horrified at how people were suffering in the Holy Land."

However, the United States Department of Homeland Security (DHS) added him to a "watch list" which provoked an international controversy and led the British Foreign Secretary Jack Straw to complain personally to the United States Secretary of State Colin Powell at the United Nations. Powell responded by stating that the watchlist was under review, adding, "I think we have that obligation to review these matters to see if we are right".

Islam believed his inclusion on a "watch list" may have simply been an error: a mistaken identification of him for a man with the same name, but different spelling. On 1 October 2004 he requested the removal of his name: "I remain bewildered by the decision of the US authorities to refuse me entry to the United States". According to his statement, the man on the list was named "Youssef Islam", indicating that Islam was not the suspected terrorism supporter.

Two years later, in December 2006, Islam was admitted without incident into the United States for several radio concert performances and interviews to promote his new record. He said of the incident at the time, "No reason was ever given, but being asked to repeat the spelling of my name again and again, made me think it was a fairly simple mistake of identity. Rumours which circulated after made me imagine otherwise."

Islam wrote a song about his 2004 exclusion from the US, titled "Boots and Sand", recorded in 2008 and featuring Paul McCartney, Dolly Parton, and Terry Sylvester.

== Controversies ==
=== Swastika controversy ===
In 1973, a photograph of Stevens wearing a swastika was published in a newspaper. Two readers sent a furious response telling Stevens he should "shove his 'Peace Train' up his ass." Afterward, many sent letters to the editor, several defending Stevens. Stevens himself responded stating: "The symbol called the swastika is much older than you think, It was a sign of light and peace for thousands of years during the early Chinese-Indian-Greek-Roman cultures, before Hitler chose the dark side." He added that he did not have any regrets: "I’m glad it happened in that it showed the good behind a symbol that some might think represents evil. Of course, it was an opportunity for someone to say that Cat Stevens is a cunt."

=== Salman Rushdie controversy ===
In 1989, following an address by Islam to students at London's Kingston Polytechnic (now Kingston University), where he was asked about the fatwa calling for the killing of Salman Rushdie, author of the novel The Satanic Verses, Islam made a series of comments that appeared to show support for the fatwa. At Kingston, he stated, "The Qur'an makes it clear, if someone defames the prophet, then he must die." He released a statement the following day denying that he supported vigilantism and claiming that he had merely recounted the Islamic Sharia law punishment for blasphemy.

Subsequently in May, he appeared on the BBC panel programme 'Hypotheticals', where he stated he would rather see Rushdie burnt over an effigy. He added that, if Rushdie came to his door, he' would "try to phone the Ayatollah Khomeini and tell him exactly where this man is." In a statement in the FAQ section of one of his websites, Islam asserted that while he regretted the comments, he was joking and that the show was improperly edited.

In the years since these comments, he has repeatedly denied ever calling for the death of Rushdie or supporting the fatwa. Appearing on BBC's Desert Island Discs on 27 September 2020, Islam claimed clever "sharp-toothed" journalists had framed his fatwa comment in a misleading way. In a 2007 letter to the editor of The Daily Telegraph, Rushdie complained of what he believed was Islam's attempts to "rewrite his past", and called his claims of innocence "rubbish".

On 12 August 2022, Rushdie suffered a knife attack as he was about to give a public lecture at the Chautauqua Institution in Chautauqua, New York, United States. In response to the attack, Islam tweeted, "Saddened and shocked to learn about the horrific act on Salman Rushdie my wish is for us all to live in peace. May God grant him and every one else who has suffered from the manic pandemic of violence in this world, a full recovery. Peace".

=== Libel cases ===
==== Lawsuit over News UK newspaper reports that he had supported terrorism ====
In October 2004, The Sun and The Sunday Times newspapers voiced their support for Islam's exclusion from the United States and claimed that he had supported terrorism. He sued for libel and received an out-of-court financial settlement from the newspapers, which both published apology statements saying that he had never supported terrorism and mentioning that he had recently been given a Man of Peace award from the World Summit of Nobel Peace Laureates. However, The Sunday Times managing editor Richard Caseby said that while there was an "agreed settlement", they "always denied liability" and "disagreed with Cat Stevens's lawyers interpretation", but took a "pragmatic view" of the lawsuit.

Islam responded that he was "delighted by the settlement [which] helps vindicate my character and good name... It seems to be the easiest thing in the world these days to make scurrilous accusations against Muslims and, in my case, it directly impacts on my relief work and damages my reputation as an artist. The harm done is often difficult to repair", and added that he intended to donate the financial award given to him by the court to help orphans of the 2004 Indian Ocean earthquake and tsunami. He wrote about the experience in a newspaper article titled "A Cat in a Wild World".

==== Lawsuit about allegations that he would not talk to unveiled women ====
On 18 July 2008, Islam received substantial undisclosed damages from the World Entertainment News Network following their publication of a story which claimed that the singer refused to speak to unveiled women. The allegations first surfaced in the German newspaper B.Z. after Islam's trip to Berlin in March 2007 to collect the Echo music award for "life achievements as musician and ambassador between cultures". Once again he was awarded damages after the World Entertainment News Network allowed an article to be published on Contactmusic.com alleging that he would not speak to unveiled women with the exception of his wife. His solicitor said "he was made out to be 'so sexist and bigoted that he refused at an awards ceremony to speak to or even acknowledge any women who were not wearing a veil'". The news agency apologised and issued a statement saying that Islam has never had any problem in working with women and that he has never required a third party to function as an intermediary at work. The money from this lawsuit went to his Small Kindness Charity.

On his website, he discussed the false allegation, saying:

The accusation that I do not speak or interact with ladies who are not veiled is an absurdity ... It's true that I have asked my manager to respectfully request that lady presenters refrain from embracing me when giving awards or during public appearances, but that has nothing to do with my feelings or respect for them. Islam simply requires me to honour the dignity of ladies or young girls who are not closely related to me, and avoid physical intimacy, however innocent it may be. ... My four daughters all follow the basic wearing of clothes which modestly cover their God-given beauty. They're extremely well educated; they do not cover their faces and interact perfectly well with friends and society.

== Awards ==
=== Humanitarian awards ===
- 2003: World Award (also known as the "World Social Award"), an award organised by Mikhail Gorbachev, for "humanitarian relief work helping children and victims of war".
- 2004: Man of Peace Award of the World Summit of Nobel Peace Laureates (an award organisation founded by Mikhail Gorbachev) for his "dedication to promote peace, the reconciliation of people and to condemn terrorism".
- 2007: Mediterranean Prize for Peace, given by Fondazio Mediterraneo in recognition of his giving voice to universal fraternity and interreligious dialogue
- 2009: Honorary Award of the German Sustainability Award
- 2015: Global Islamic Economy Awards for contributions toward peace through the Arts
- 2015: Steiger Award honoured in the category "International" for his commitment to charitable projects

=== Honorary degrees ===
- 2005: honorary doctorate by the University of Gloucestershire for services to education and humanitarian relief.
- 2007: Honorary doctorate (LLD) by the University of Exeter, in recognition of "his humanitarian work and improving understanding between Islamic and Western cultures".

=== Music awards and recognitions ===
- 2005: ASCAP Songwriter of the Year and Song of the Year for "The First Cut Is the Deepest"
- 2006: Ranked 49th in Paste's "100 Best Living Songwriters"
- 2006: ASCAP Songwriter of the Year for "The First Cut Is the Deepest" (second time)
- 2007: ECHO "Special Award for Life Achievements as a Musician and Ambassador Between Cultures"
- 2007: Ivor Novello Award for Outstanding Song Collection from the British Academy of Songwriters, Composers and Authors (BASCA).
- 2007: The Mediterranean Art and Creativity Award by the Fondazione Mediterraneo.
- 2008: Nomination (unsuccessful) for Songwriters Hall of Fame
- 2014: Inducted into the Rock and Roll Hall of Fame
- 2015: Lifetime Achievement Award at the BBC Radio 2 Folk Awards
- 2017: Grammy Award nomination for Best Folk Album
- 2019: Inducted into the Songwriters Hall of Fame

== Discography ==
=== As Cat Stevens ===
- 1967: Matthew and Son
- 1967: New Masters
- 1970: Mona Bone Jakon
- 1970: Tea for the Tillerman
- 1971: Teaser and the Firecat
- 1972: Catch Bull at Four
- 1973: Foreigner
- 1974: Buddha and the Chocolate Box
- 1975: Numbers
- 1977: Izitso
- 1978: Back to Earth

=== As Yusuf Islam ===
- 1995: The Life of the Last Prophet
- 1999: Prayers of the Last Prophet
- 2000: A Is for Allah
- 2001: Bismillah
- 2002: In Praise of the Last Prophet
- 2003: I Look I See
- 2008: I Look, I See 2
- 2014: The Story of Adam and Creation

=== As Yusuf ===
- 2006: An Other Cup
- 2009: Roadsinger
- 2014: Tell 'Em I'm Gone

=== As Yusuf / Cat Stevens ===
- 2017: The Laughing Apple
- 2020: Tea for the Tillerman 2
- 2023: King of a Land

== Books ==
- The Life of The Last Prophet, 1996. London: Mountain of Light. ISBN 1-900675-00-5.
- Prayers of The Last Prophet, 1998/2000. London: Mountain of Light. ISBN 1-900675-05-6.
- Why I Still Carry a Guitar: My Spiritual Journey from Cat Stevens to Yusuf, 2014. London: HarperCollins. ISBN 978-0-06-240623-1.
- Cat On The Road to Find Out, 2025, Genesis Publications.

== See also ==
- List of peace activists
- List of best-selling music artists
- List of converts to Islam
- Rolling Stone's 500 Greatest Albums of All Time
