= Electronics in rock music =

Use of electronic instruments in rock music

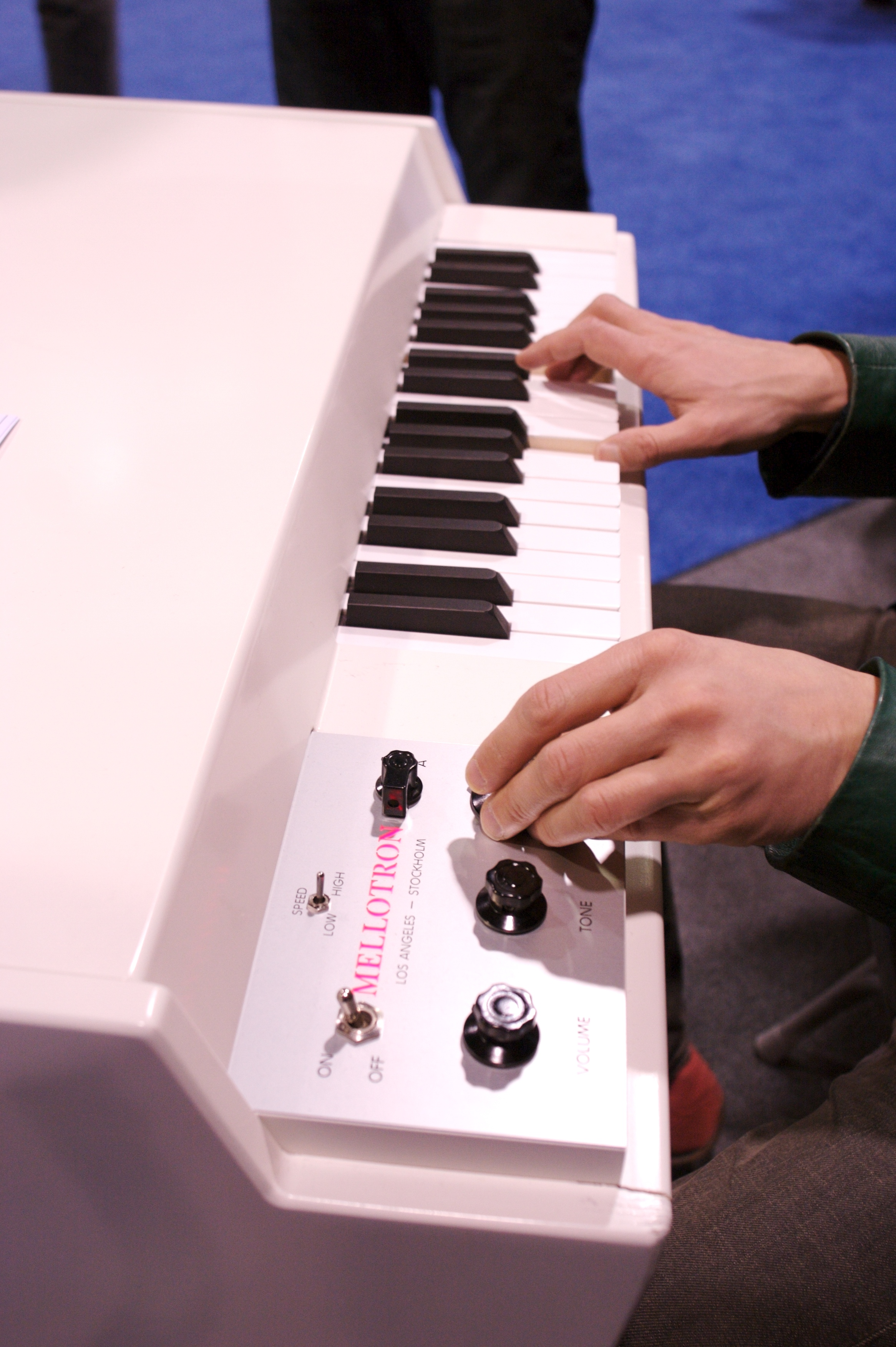
A Mellotron, an early form of music sampler, used extensively in the late 1960s and early 1970s

The use of electronic music technology in rock music coincided with the practical availability of electronic musical instruments and the genre's emergence as a distinct style. Rock music has been highly dependent on technological developments, particularly the invention and refinement of the synthesizer, the development of the MIDI digital format and computer technology.

In the late 1960s, rock musicians began to use electronic instruments, like the theremin and Mellotron, to supplement and define their sound; by the end of the decade the Moog synthesizer took a leading place in the sound of emerging progressive rock bands who would dominate rock in the early 1970s. In the 1980s, more commercially oriented synthpop dominated electronic rock. In the new millennium the spread of recording software led to the development of new distinct genres including electroclash, dance-punk and new rave.

== Technology ==
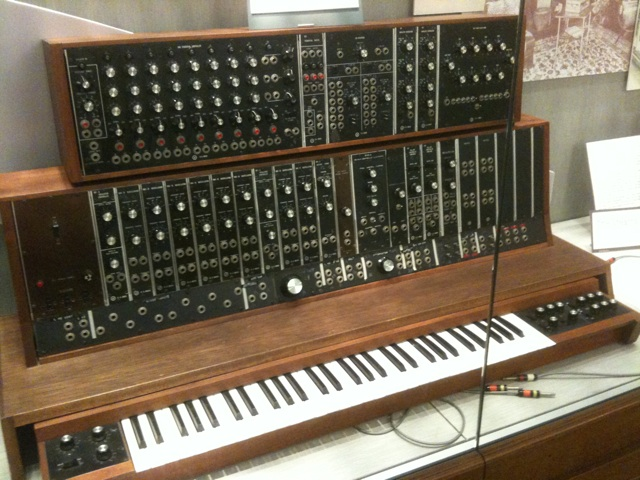
The first commercial Moog synthesizer, commissioned by the Alwin Nikolais Dance Theater of NY in 1964

Experiments in tape manipulation or musique concrète, early computer music and early sampling and sound manipulation technologies paved the way for both manipulating and creating new sounds through technology. The world's first computer to play music was CSIRAC in 1950–1, designed and built by Trevor Pearcey and Maston Beard and programmed by mathematician Geoff Hill. Early electronic instruments included the theremin, which uses two metal antennas that sense the position of a player's hands and control oscillators for frequency with one hand, and amplitude (volume) to produce an eerie but difficult to manipulate sound. It was used by avant garde and classical musicians in the early twentieth century and was used on a large number of 1940s and 50s science fiction films and suspense.

Electronic musical synthesizers that could be used practically in a recording studio became available in the mid-1960s, around the same time as rock music began to emerge as a distinct musical genre. The Mellotron, an electro-mechanical, polyphonic sample-playback keyboard, which used a bank of parallel linear magnetic audio tape strips to produce a variety of sounds enjoyed popularity from the mid-1960s. The initial popularity of the Mellotron would be overtaken by the Moog synthesizer, created by Robert Moog in 1964, which produced completely electronically generated sounds which could be manipulated by pitch and frequency, allowing the "bending" of notes and considerable variety and musical virtuosity to be expressed. The early commercial Moog synthesiser was large and difficult to manipulate, but in 1970 Moog responded to its use in rock and pop music by releasing the portable Mini-moog, which was much simpler, easier to use, and proved more practical for live performance. Early synthesisers were monophonic (only able to play one note at a time), but polyphonic versions began to be produced from the mid-1970s, among the first being the Prophet-5.

MIDI (Musical Instrument Digital Interface) was created in 1982, as an industry-standard protocol that enables electronic musical instruments (synthesizers, drum machines), computers and other electronic equipment (MIDI controllers, sound cards, samplers) to communicate and synchronize with each other. Unlike previous analog devices, MIDI does not transmit an audio signal, but sends event messages about pitch and intensity, control signals for parameters such as volume, vibrato and panning, cues, and clock signals to set the tempo, allowing the building of more complex music and the integration of different devices.

In the new millennium, as computer technology become more accessible and music software has advanced, interacting with music production technology is now possible using means that bear no relationship to traditional musical performance practices: for instance, laptop performance (laptronica) and live coding. In the last decade a number of software-based virtual studio environments have emerged, with products such as Propellerhead's Reason, Ableton Live and Native Instruments Reaktor finding widespread appeal. Such tools provide viable and cost-effective alternatives to typical hardware-based production studios, and thanks to advances in microprocessor technology, it is now possible to create high quality music using little more than a single laptop computer. Such advances have been seen as democratizing music creation, leading to a massive increase in the amount of home-produced electronic music available to the general public via the internet.

== History ==
=== 1960s ===
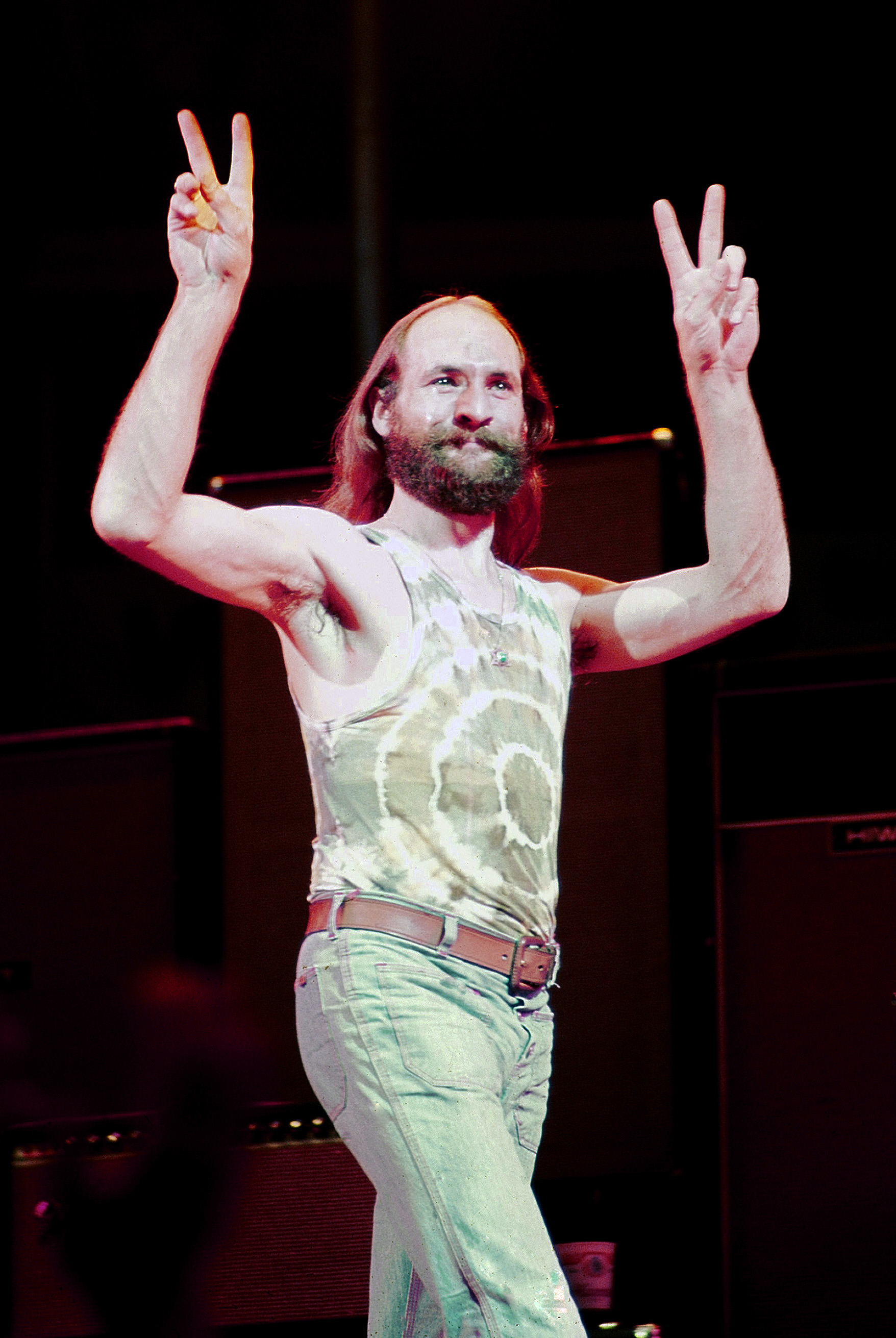
Mike Pinder of the Moody Blues, a pioneer of electronic rock, in 1974

One of the earliest composers to use electronic instruments in popular music was Joe Meek with the album I Hear A New World (recorded in 1959, but not fully released until 1991), and the 1962 song "Telstar", originally recorded by The Tornados. The 1960s saw the utilization of studio techniques and new technologies to achieve unusual and new sounds. Small guitar stomp boxes and various guitar effects are developed which distort or alter the sound quality of the electric guitar in various ways. The Mellotron was used by multi-instrumentalist Graham Bond from 1965 and soon adopted by Mike Pinder of The Moody Blues from 1966 on songs including "Nights In White Satin" and by The Beatles from "Strawberry Fields Forever" (1967). Ian McDonald of King Crimson, Rick Wakeman of Yes and Tony Banks of Genesis also became major Mellotron users at this time, infusing the violin, cello, brass, flute and choir sounds as a major texture in the music of their respective bands.

The Beach Boys' track "I Just Wasn't Made for These Times" from Pet Sounds (1966) was the first recorded use of an Electro-Theremin on a rock album, and the first rock album to incorporate a Theremin-like instrument. The late '60s also saw the popularization of the Moog synthesizer. The Doors' 1967 album Strange Days would also feature a Moog on several tracks, played by Paul Beaver. Micky Dolenz of The Monkees bought one of the first Moog synthesizers and the band was 3rd to feature it on an album (behind The Zodiac: Cosmic Sounds and Strange Days) with Pisces, Aquarius, Capricorn & Jones Ltd. in 1967, which reached number 1 on the US charts. Wendy Carlos's Switched-On Bach (1968), recorded using a Moog influenced numerous musicians of that era and is one of the most popular recordings of classical music ever made. The sound of the Moog also reached the mass market with Simon and Garfunkel's Bookends in 1968 and The Beatles' Abbey Road (1969).

=== 1970s ===
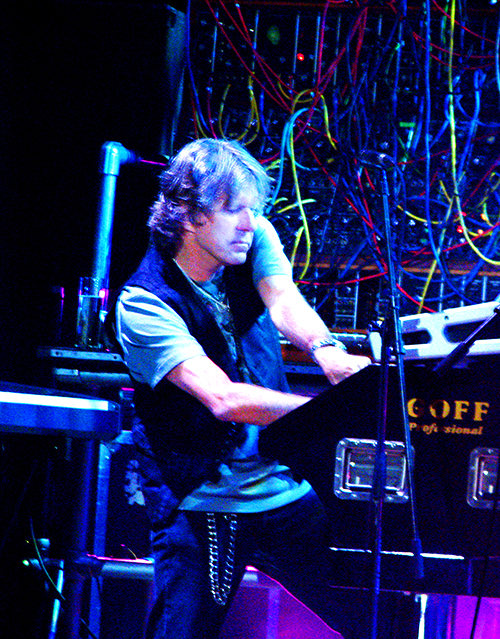
Keith Emerson performing in St. Petersburg in 2008

Progressive rock musicians such as Richard Wright of Pink Floyd and Rick Wakeman of Yes were soon using the new portable synthesizers extensively. Other early users included Emerson, Lake & Palmer's Keith Emerson, Pete Townshend, Electric Light Orchestra, Genesis, Return to Forever, and Weather Report. Instrumental prog rock was particularly significant in continental Europe, allowing bands like Kraftwerk, Tangerine Dream, Can, Faust and Klaus Schulze to circumvent the language barrier. Their synthesiser-heavy "Kraut rock", along with the work of Brian Eno (for a time the keyboard player with Roxy Music), would be a major influence on subsequent electronic rock. In 1972, jazz musician Stan Free, under the pseudonym Hot Butter had a top 10 hit in the United States and United Kingdom with a cover of the 1969 Gershon Kingsley song "Popcorn". It is considered a forerunner to synthpop due to the use of the Moog synthesizer. The same year, Japanese musician Isao Tomita released the electronic album Electric Samurai: Switched on Rock, a collection of Moog synthesizer renditions of contemporary rock songs. It featured voice synthesis and synthesizer programming that he would later carry over to his 1974 hit album Snowflakes Are Dancing. His work was considered a revolution in synthesizer programming. Osamu Kitajima's 1974 progressive psychedelic rock album Benzaiten, featuring Haruomi Hosono, utilized a synthesizer, rhythm machine, and electronic drums. The mid-1970s saw the rise of electronic art musicians such as Jean Michel Jarre, Vangelis, and Tomita, who with Brian Eno were a significant influence on the development of new-age music.

Synthesisers were not universally welcomed by rock musicians in the 1970s. Some bands, including Queen, stated on their album liner notes that they did not use synthesisers. Similarly, early guitar-based punk rock was initially hostile to the "inauthentic" sound of the synthesiser, but many new wave and post-punk bands that emerged from the movement began to adopt it as a major part of their sound. The American duo Suicide, who arose from the New York punk scene, utilized drum machines and synthesizers on their eponymous 1977 album. British bands Throbbing Gristle and Cabaret Voltaire moved on to use a variety of electronic and sampling techniques to produce industrial music.

In April 1977, Cat Stevens' Izitso updated his pop rock and folk rock style with the extensive use of synthesizers, giving it a more synthpop style; "Was Dog a Doughnut?" in particular was an early techno-pop fusion track, which made early use of a music sequencer. 1977 was also the year that Ultravox member Warren Cann purchased a Roland TR-77 drum machine, which was first featured in their October 1977 single release "Hiroshima Mon Amour". The ballad arrangement, metronome-like percussion and heavy use of the ARP Odyssey synthesizer was an early attempt to fuse traditional rock with the new musical technology. The Japanese band Yellow Magic Orchestra pioneered synthpop with their self-titled album (1978) and Solid State Survivor (1979), with the latter including several early computerized rock songs, such as a mechanized cover version of The Beatles' "Day Tripper" (1965). Also in 1978, the first incarnation of The Human League released their début single "Being Boiled" and Devo moved towards a more electronic sound. Others were soon to follow, including Tubeway Army, a little known outfit from West London, who dropped their punk rock image and jumped on the band wagon, topping the UK charts in the summer of 1979 with the single "Are Friends Electric?". This prompted the singer, Gary Numan to go solo and in the same year he released the Kraftwerk inspired album, The Pleasure Principle and topped the charts for the second time with the single "Cars".

=== 1980s ===
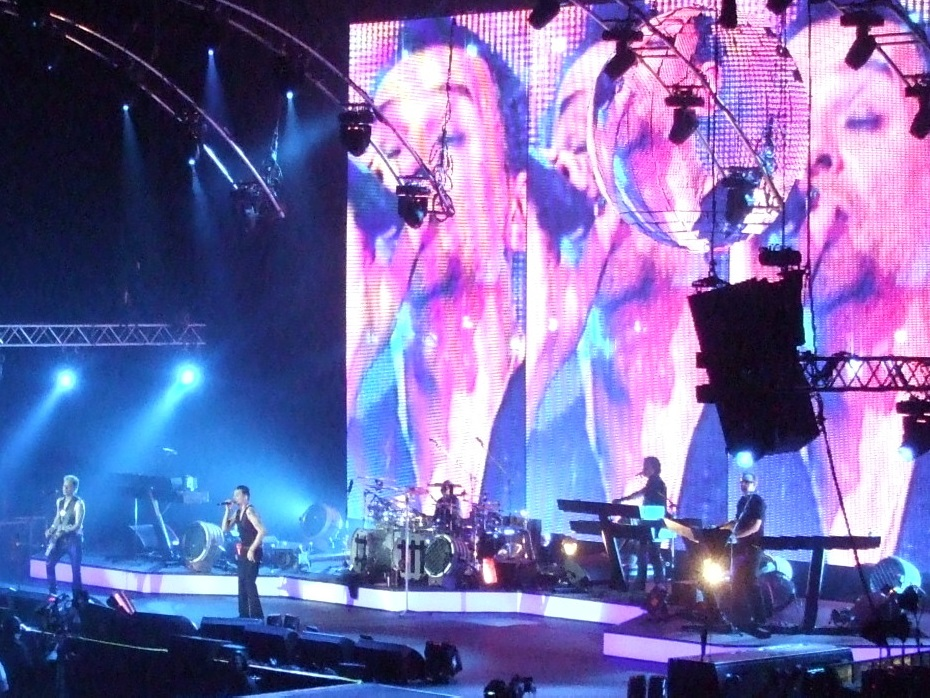
Depeche Mode in concert at London's O_{2} Arena, 2009

The definition of MIDI and the development of digital audio made the creation of purely electronic sounds much easier. This led to the growth of synthpop, by which, particularly through their adoption by the New Romantic movement, synthesizers came to dominate the pop and rock music of the early 80s. The early sound of synthpop was "eerie, sterile, and vaguely menacing", but more commercially orientated bands like Duran Duran adopted dance beats to produce a catchier and warmer sound. They were soon followed into the charts by a large number of bands who used synthesizers to create three-minute pop singles. These included New Romantics combined elements of glam rock, science fiction and romanticism, and adopted an elaborate visual style such as Spandau Ballet, A Flock of Seagulls, Culture Club, ABC, Soft Cell, Talk Talk, B-Movie and the Eurythmics, sometimes using synthesizers to replace all other instruments, until the style began to fall from popularity in the mid-1980s.

=== 1990s ===
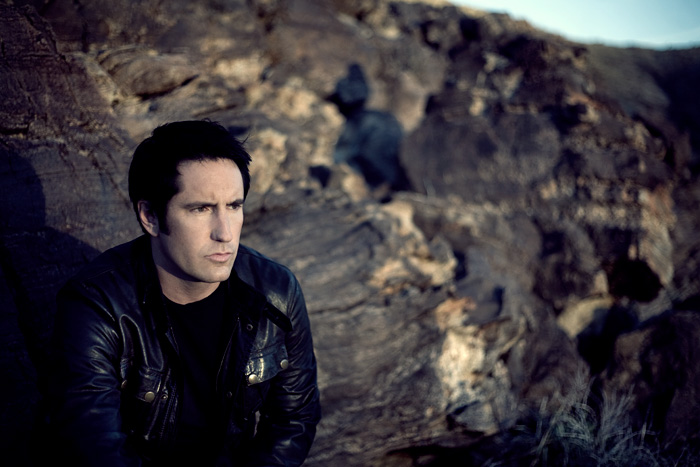
Trent Reznor of Nine Inch Nails in 2008

In the 90s many electronic acts applied rock sensibilities to their music in a genre which became known as big beat. It fused "old-school party breakbeats" with diverse samples, in a way that was reminiscent of Old school hip hop. Big beat was criticised for dumbing down the electronica wave of the late 1990s. This sound was popularised by British acts such as Fatboy Slim, The Prodigy and The Chemical Brothers and from the US The Crystal Method, Überzone and Lunatic Calm.

This period also saw the rise of artists who combined industrial rock and metal. Ministry and Nine Inch Nails both recorded platinum-selling albums. Their success led to mainstream attention other industrial musicians; including Foetus and Coil. The mid-90s was a high point for industrial rock, when, in addition to bands that had been around since the 1980s, such as KMFDM, newer bands such as Gravity Kills emerged as commercial acts.

=== 2000s ===
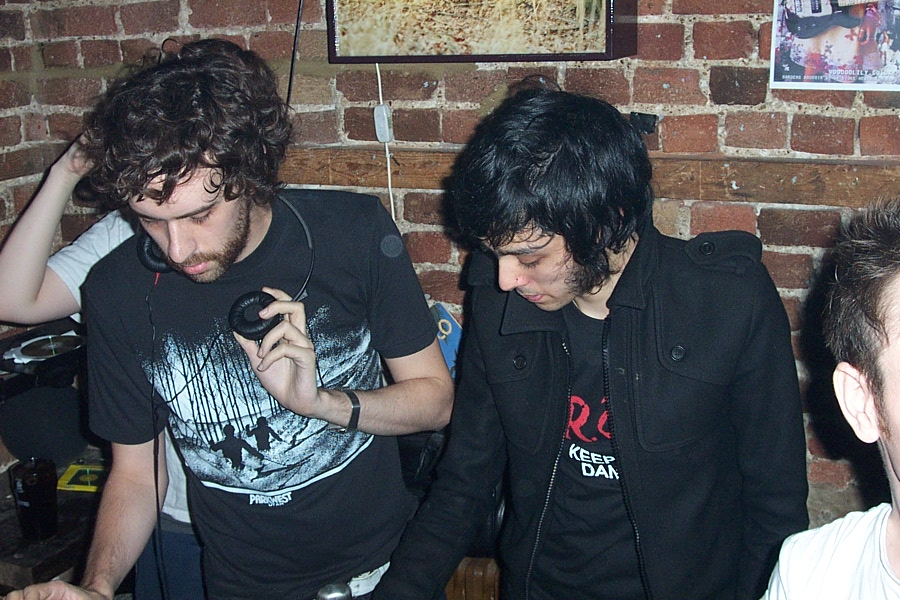
Gaspard Augé and Xavier de Rosnay of Justice in 2007

In the 2000s, with the increased accessibility of computer technology and advances in music software, it became possible to create high quality music using little more than a single laptop computer. This resulted in a massive increase in the amount of home-produced electronic music available to the general public via the expanding internet, and new forms of performance such as laptronica and live coding. These techniques also began to be used by existing bands, as with industrial rock act Nine Inch Nails' album Year Zero (2007), and by developing genres that mixed rock with digital techniques and sounds, including indietronica, electroclash, dance-punk and new rave.

Indietronica, which had begun in the early '90s with bands like Stereolab and Disco Inferno, took off in the new millennium as the new digital technology developed, with acts including Broadcast from the UK, Justice from France, Lali Puna from Germany and The Postal Service and Ratatat from the US, mixing a variety of indie sounds with electronic music, largely produced on small independent labels. The Electroclash subgenre began in New York at the end of the 1990s, combining synth pop, techno, punk and performance art. It was pioneered by I-F with his track "Space Invaders Are Smoking Grass" (1998), and pursued by artists including Felix da Housecat, Peaches, Chicks on Speed and Fischerspooner. Initially Ladytron were labeled as electroclash by some journalists, but they rejected this tag. It gained international attention at the beginning of the new millennium and spread to scenes in London and Berlin, but rapidly faded as a recognisable genre. Dance-punk, mixing post-punk sounds with disco and funk, had developed in the 1980s, but it was revived among some bands of the garage rock/post-punk revival in the early years of the new millennium, particularly among New York acts such as LCD Soundsystem, Liars, The Rapture, and Radio 4, joined by dance-oriented acts who adopted rock sounds such as Out Hud. In Britain the combination of indie with dance-punk was dubbed new rave in publicity for Klaxons and the term was picked up and applied by the NME to bands including Trash Fashion, New Young Pony Club, Hadouken!, Late of the Pier, Test Icicles and Shitdisco, forming a scene with a similar visual aesthetic to earlier rave music.

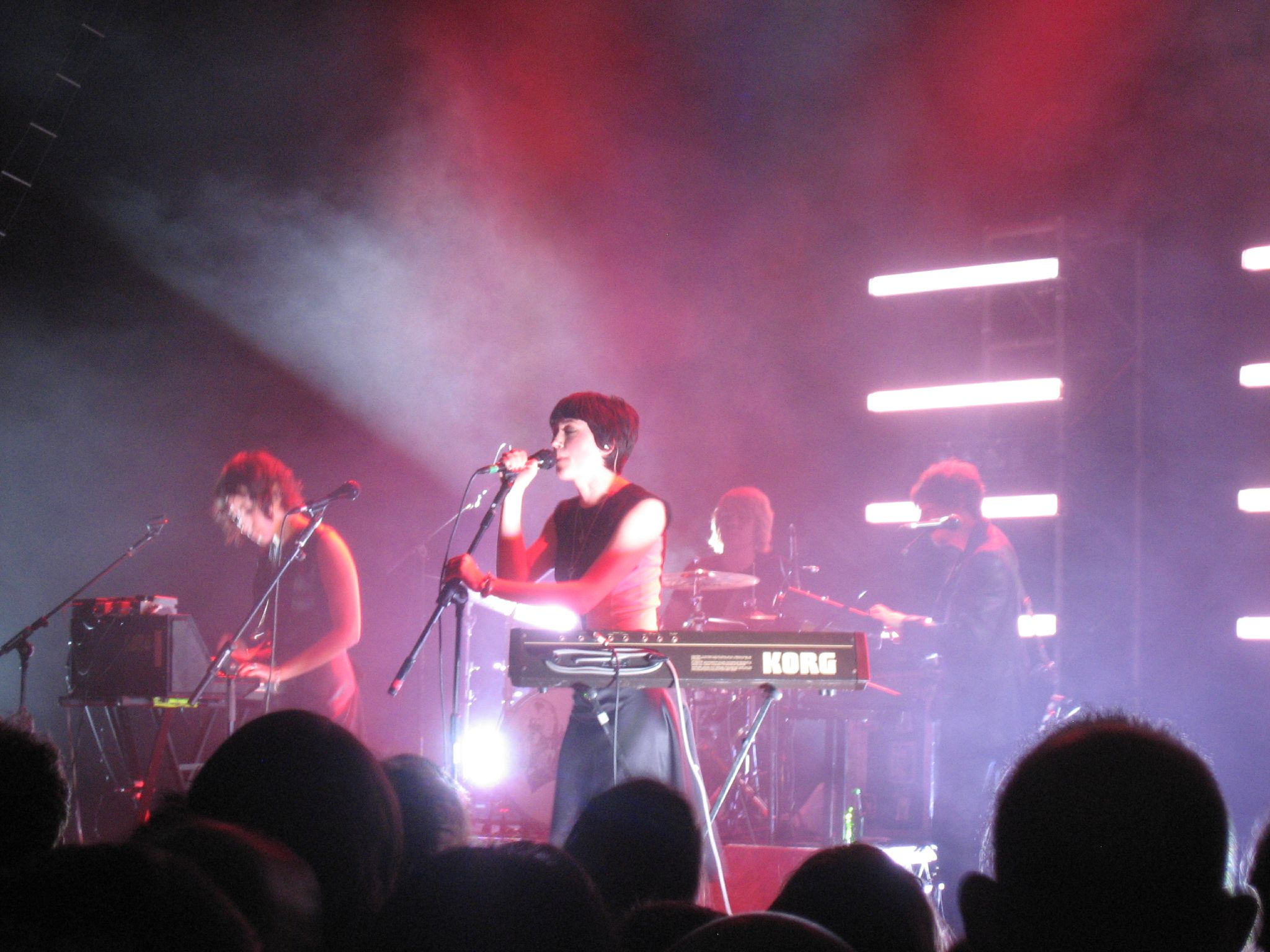
Ladytron in 2008, originally categorised as electroclash they helped revive interest in synthpop

Renewed interest in electronic music and nostalgia for the 1980s led to the beginnings of a synthpop revival, with acts including Adult and Fischerspooner. In 2003-4 it began to move into the mainstream with Ladytron, the Postal Service, Cut Copy, the Bravery and The Killers all producing records that incorporated vintage synthesizer sounds and styles which contrasted with the dominant sounds of post-grunge and nu-metal. In particular the Killers enjoyed considerable airplay and exposure and their debut album Hot Fuss (2004) reached the Billboard Top Ten. The Killers, the Bravery and the Stills all left their synthpop sound behind after their debut albums and began to explore classic 1970s rock.

Some modern practitioners of metal and hardcore punk subgenres such as post-hardcore and metalcore have been influenced by electronic music. In addition to typical metal and hardcore characteristics, these groups make use of synthesizers, electronically produced rhythms and beats, and auto-tuned vocals. Such groups have been formed in England, the United States, Canada, Brazil, Hong Kong and Czech Republic. The trend has been referred to using the terms electronicore, synthcore, and trancecore, among others. Some recently formed post-hardcore and metalcore bands utilize characteristics of electronica. Sumerian Records notes that "there has been a surplus of 'electronica/hardcore' music as of late". Notable bands that demonstrate a fusion of hardcore punk subgenres and electronic dance music include Abandon All Ships, Attack Attack!, Asking Alexandria, All For A Vision, Enter Shikari, I See Stars Breathe Carolina, Ghost Town and Public Relations. Horse the Band acted so on a somewhat different way by combining metalcore with chiptune called Nintendocore.

== See also ==
- New musick
- Synth-punk
