= Electronic music (disambiguation) =

Electronic music is music made with electronics.

Electronic music may also refer to:

- Electronic dance music, electronic dance and pop music such as drum and bass, trance and techno
- Electronica, popular genre of electronic music, usually groove-based
- Electronic musical instrument, a musical instrument that produces its sounds using electronics
- Electronic (band)

== See also ==
- List of electronic music genres
- Electronic rock (disambiguation)
