= Electronic rock (disambiguation) =

Electronic rock is a music genre that involves a combination of rock music and electronic music.

Electronic rock may also refer to:

- Electronics in rock music

== Subgenres ==
- Alternative dance, from the 1980s
- Dance-punk, from the 1970s
- Electronicore, from the 2000s
- Electropunk, from the 1970s
- Indie electronic, from the 1990s
- Industrial rock, from the 1970s
- Krautrock, from the 1970s
- New Music, a broad rock music movement from the 1970s–80s
  - New Romantic, a subcategory
  - New wave music, from the 1970s
    - Post-punk, originally a synonym and later a distinguished genre
    - Synth-pop, as above
      - Electropop, as above
- Progressive rock, from the 1970s
  - Art rock, originally a synonym and later a distinguished genre
- Psychedelic rock, from the 1960s

== See also ==
- Electronic music
