= (I Never Wanted) To Be a Star =

- German single sleeve

Single by Cat Stevens

from the album Izitso
- B-side: "The Doves"
- Released: 1977
- Recorded: 1976-1977
- Studio: Sound 80 Studios, Minneapolis, Minnesota
- Genre: Folk rock, electronic rock, synth-pop
- Length: 3:03
- Label: Island (UK/Europe); A&M (US/Canada)
- Songwriter: Cat Stevens
- Producers: Cat Stevens, David Kershenbaum

Cat Stevens singles chronology
"Was Dog a Doughnut?" (1977)	"(I Never Wanted) To Be a Star" (1977)	"Sweet Jamaica" (1977)

"(I Never Wanted) To Be a Star" is a song written and recorded by English singer-songwriter Cat Stevens between 1976 and 1977, released on his album Izitso. It received release as a single in 1977, exclusive to Germany and Spain. The song is about Stevens's growing distaste and disillusionment with the music industry.

== Background and overview ==
"(I Never Wanted) To Be a Star" references the transition phase happening in his life, as Stevens was growing more and more resentful of the more commercial aspects of the music industry. The lyrics make references to four of his early songs: "Matthew and Son", "I'm Gonna Get Me a Gun", "A Bad Night", and "I Think I See the Light". The song also features the line "izitso, izitso?", which inspired Izitso's title.

Music journalist Chris Charlesworth identified the song as "autobiographical in lyrical content". Additionally, Charlesworth felt "To Be a Star" developed the theme of the song "Pop Star" from Stevens's third album Mona Bone Jakon. AllMusic's William Ruhlmann described "To Be a Star" as "[exploring] Stevens' ambivalence about being in the music business, an attitude that would find him dropping out and finding religion after one more album."

Retrospectively, Stevens has said the following about "To Be a Star":

"The need for fame is nothing more than wanting to be appreciated, and that was the thought behind the song. I understood then that my whole urge to be recognized was only seeking some confidence, that I have some value. Stardom is like that- people need to be reassured that they're wanted."

Not long after "(I Never Wanted) To Be a Star" and Izitso's release, on 23 December 1977, Stevens entered Regent's Park Mosque and formally embraced Islam after a long spiritual search. Due to mixed beliefs in Islam surrounding music, he decided to drop his music career and leave the industry the following year. Stevens told reporters that there were "a combination of reasons, really" and that the music business's demands had been "becoming a chore, and not an inspiration anymore". He finally returned to pop music in the 2000s, nearly three decades later.

The track has since been reissued on Stevens's 1984 compilation album Footsteps in the Dark: Greatest Hits, Vol. 2.

Charley Walters of Rolling Stone called the song "rather precious".
