= (Remember the Days of the) Old Schoolyard =

Single by Cat Stevens

from the album Izitso
- B-side: "The Doves" (UK/Europe) "Land o' Freelove & Goodbye" (US/Canada/Japan)
- Released: 3 June 1977
- Length: 2:44
- Label: Island (UK/Europe); A&M (US/Canada)
- Songwriter: Cat Stevens
- Producers: Cat Stevens; David Kershenbaum

Cat Stevens singles chronology
"Banapple Gas" (1976)	"(Remember the Days of the) Old Schoolyard" (1977)	"Was Dog a Doughnut?" (1977)

Audio sample
- "(Remember the Days of the) Old Schoolyard": file; help

"(Remember the Days of the) Old Schoolyard" is a song by English singer-songwriter Cat Stevens. It was first released by Linda Lewis in February 1975 and included on her album Not a Little Girl Anymore (1975). Stevens' version was released as the lead single from his tenth studio album Izitso (1977) on 3 June 1977, as a duet with Elkie Brooks.

== Lyrics and composition ==
The song begins with a recording of children playing. The synth-laden track features an arrangement of instruments dominated by horns. The lyrics of the song describe nostalgia for school.

== Critical reception ==
Stereo Review described it as "a model of energy and vitality without a trace of the phony frenzy or fake hysteria that so many other young singers try to pawn off as high spirits".

== Charts ==
"Old Schoolyard" reached number 33 on the Billboard Hot 100, and would be his last top 40 placement there to date. In the UK, it reached number 44, Stevens' last chart appearance there until 2004.

Chart (1977)	Peak position
Australia Kent Music Report	18
Canadian Singles Chart RPM Top 100	27
Canada Adult Contemporary RPM AC	14
France Syndicat National de l'Édition Phonographique	35
UK Singles Chart	44
US Billboard Hot 100	33
US Adult Contemporary	28
US Top 100 Singles Cashbox	38
