= Public Relations (band) =

Czech rock band

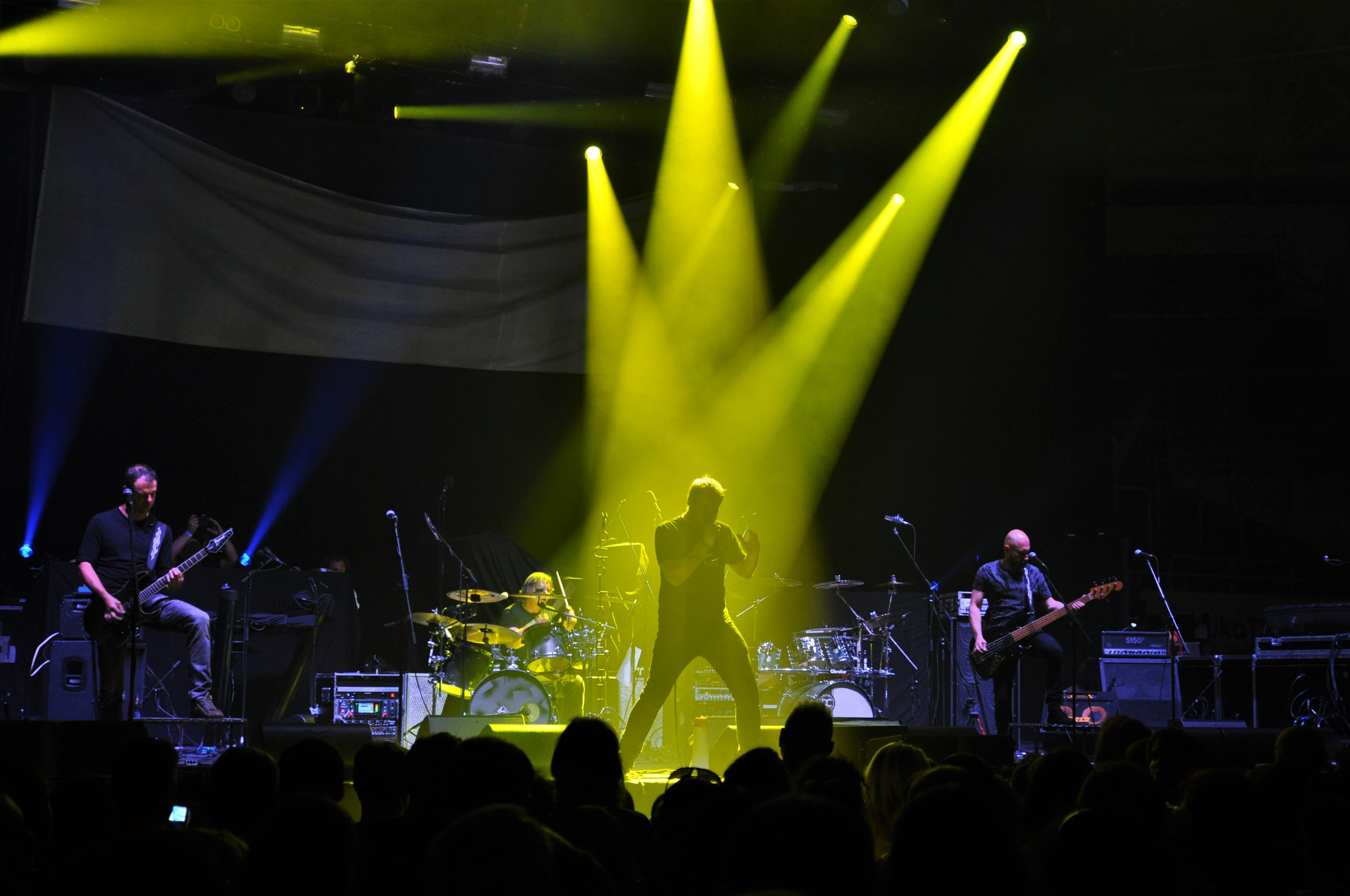
- Public Relations performing in 2017

Background information
- Origin: Ostrava, Czechia
- Genres: Emocore (early); rap rock (early); Electronic rock
- Years active: 2004–2022
- Past members: David Tobi Tobiasz; Jiří Sosik; Tomáš Klos; Marek Konečný; Jan Ražnok; Přemysl Weber
- Website: public.relations.cz

Public Relations was a Czech electronic rock band formed in Ostrava in 2004. They sang both in Czech and English, releasing six studio albums and one EP and breaking up in 2022.

== History ==
Public Relations was formed in the Czech city of Ostrava in 2004. Initially playing emocore and rap rock, they released their debut album, No Turns, in 2008. They followed it with The Platinum Air in 2011. Their next release, Reset, came out in 2013 and shifted the band's style to electronic rock. In 2016, Public Relations published the concept album named Sirael.

The band's next record, Překonej svůj strach, released in 2020, was the last with vocalist Jan "Comar" Ražnok, who had been with Public Relations since 2013. He was replaced by Přemysl Weber, who left after six months, however, and his place was taken by David Tobi Tobiasz. In 2022, the band released the album Naděje, which consisted of 12 new versions of songs from their previous three records, all sung in Czech. Public Relations ceased activity the same year.

== Band members ==
Final lineup

- David Tobi Tobiasz – vocals
- Jiří Sosik – guitar
- Tomáš Klos – bass
- Marek Konečný – drums

Past members

- Jan "Comar" Ražnok – vocals
- Přemysl Weber – vocals

== Discography ==
- No Turns (2008)
- The Platinum Air (2011)
- Close to Sun (EP, 2013)
- Reset (2013)
- Sirael (2016)
- Překonej svůj strach (2020)
- Naděje (2022)
