= Was Dog a Doughnut? =

- US single sleeve, illustrated by Cat Stevens

Single by Cat Stevens

from the album Izitso
- B-side: "Sweet Jamaica"
- Released: October 1977
- Recorded: 1976-1977
- Studio: Sweet Silence Studios, Copenhagen, Denmark
- Genre: Hip-hop, electronic rock, synth-pop
- Length: 4:14
- Label: Island (UK/Europe); A&M (US/Canada)
- Songwriter: Cat Stevens
- Producers: Cat Stevens, David Kershenbaum

Cat Stevens singles chronology
"(Remember the Days of the) Old Schoolyard" (1977)	"Was Dog a Doughnut?" (1977)	"(I Never Wanted) To Be a Star" (1977)

"Was Dog a Doughnut?" is a song written and recorded by English singer-songwriter Cat Stevens between 1976 and 1977, appearing on his album Izitso. It was released as a single in October 1977, peaking at no. 70 on the US Billboard Hot 100, and no. 53 on the Hot Soul Singles chart. "Was Dog a Doughnut?" was entirely instrumental; described as having a "rigid, stuttering, drum loop", with the occasional sound effect of a dog barking. It contained elements later associated with hip-hop music.

== Background ==
In an interview for Uncut in 2014, Stevens explained that the song's inspiration came from an article published in the 1970s, titled "Was God an Astronaut?" The concept of God in a space rocket infuriated Stevens but also made him laugh, resulting in him deciding "to have a go and [write] that song".

In retrospective, Stevens's drummer Bruce Lynch described the song's recording as "almost a little bit self-indulgent," adding that "it was a collaborative effort, we were all diving away at buttons, manipulating sliders and voltage control oscillators and filters."

During an interview with Paste Magazine, hip-hop musician Questlove mentioned the track, stating: “It was really just [Stevens] creating a filler cut, experimenting with some electronic instruments." However, he called it "a staple in the hip-hop world", which Stevens was surprised to hear.

"Was Dog a Doughnut?" was sometimes misattributed to John Benitez, also known as Jellybean, due to his 1984 remix of the song.

== Release and reception ==
"Was Dog a Doughnut?" was Stevens's only song to chart on the Billboard Hot Soul Singles chart, reaching no. 53.

DJ Frankie Bones said the following about the song:

“As history goes, 'Was Dog a Doughnut?' is not recognized as one of the most important electronic records ever made. People always give Kraftwerk's 'Trans Europe Express' a name-check for that... On this 1977 release we have the prototype electro track, one that pre-dates Giorgio Moroder, Kraftwerk and YMO. We have a timeless classic here, Moog eruptions and electronic drum programming which arrived five years prior to the Roland 808.”

Charley Walters of Rolling Stone criticized the song for sounding "a bit too robotlike", labeling it as one of Izitso's few "weaknesses".

== Charts ==
Chart (1977)	Peak position
Canada RPM Top Singles	79
US Billboard Hot 100	70
US Hot R&B/Hip-Hop Songs (Billboard)	53
