= Izitso =

Studio album by Cat Stevens
- Released: April 1977
- Recorded: 18 September 1976 – March 1977
- Studios: Muscle Shoals Sound Studio, Sheffield, Alabama; Sound 80 Studios, Minneapolis, Minnesota; Ardent Studios, Memphis, Tennessee; Le Studio, Morin Heights, Quebec, Canada; Sweet Silence Studios, Copenhagen, Denmark
- Genres: Soft rock, folk rock, electronic rock, synthpop
- Length: 35:55
- Labels: Island (UK/Europe); A&M (US/Canada)
- Producers: Cat Stevens; David Kershenbaum

Cat Stevens chronology
Numbers (1975)	Izitso (1977)	Back to Earth (1978)

Singles from Izitso
- 1. "(Remember the Days of the) Old Schoolyard" Released: May 1977; 2. "Was Dog a Doughnut?" Released: October 1977; 3. "(I Never Wanted) To Be a Star" Released: 1977 (DE, ES); 4. "Sweet Jamaica" Released: 1977; 5. "Child for a Day" Released: 1978 (DE)

Izitso is the tenth studio album by the British singer-songwriter Cat Stevens, released in April 1977. After the lacklustre Numbers, the album proved to be his comeback. The album updated the rhythmic folk rock and pop rock style of his earlier albums with the extensive use of synthesizers and other electronic music instruments, giving the album a more electronic rock and synthpop style, and anticipating elements of electro.

== Overview ==
The album reached No. 7 on the American Pop Albums charts.

It also included his last US and UK top 40 chart hit for almost three decades, "(Remember the Days of the) Old Schoolyard", an early synthpop song that used the Polymoog, an early polyphonic synthesizer; it was a duet with fellow UK singer Elkie Brooks. Linda Lewis appears in the song's video, with Cat Stevens singing to her, as they portray former schoolmates, singing to each other on a schoolyard merry-go-round. (This is one of the few music videos that Stevens made, other than simple videos of concert performances.) In Canada, the additional singles "Sweet Jamaica" and "Was Dog A Doughnut" reached numbers 98 and 79 respectively.

The song "Child for a Day" was featured in the 1977 film First Love, starring Susan Dey and William Katt.

The song "Was Dog a Doughnut?" upon release was criticised for sounding "a bit too robotlike" with elements later associated with hip hop music. The track made early use of a music sequencer along with synthesizers. In an interview for Uncut in 2014, Yusuf (Stevens) explains his inspiration for the song:

In the '70s, there was an article that made me furious, but also made me laugh, called "Was God An Astronaut?" The whole premise of putting God into a space rocket was so outrageous I just decided to have a go and wrote that song.

The album's title comes from the line "izitso, izitso?" in the song "(I Never Wanted) To Be a Star".

Stevens, who had a strong interest in Islam prior to recording the album, formally converted to Islam later in the year and adopted the name Yusuf Islam in 1978, by which time the album Back to Earth would be released and Islam had essentially retired from the music business. It would be nearly 30 years before he would again perform Cat Stevens songs.

A piano/vocal sheet music book with every song from the album was published in 1977, approved by Stevens, with arrangements by Los Angeles musician Laddie Chapman.

== Unreleased session with Ringo Starr ==
Some of the album's unreleased tracks featured Ringo Starr on the drums, during a recording session on 30 September 1976. According to The Beatles biographer Kristofer Engelhardt in 1998,

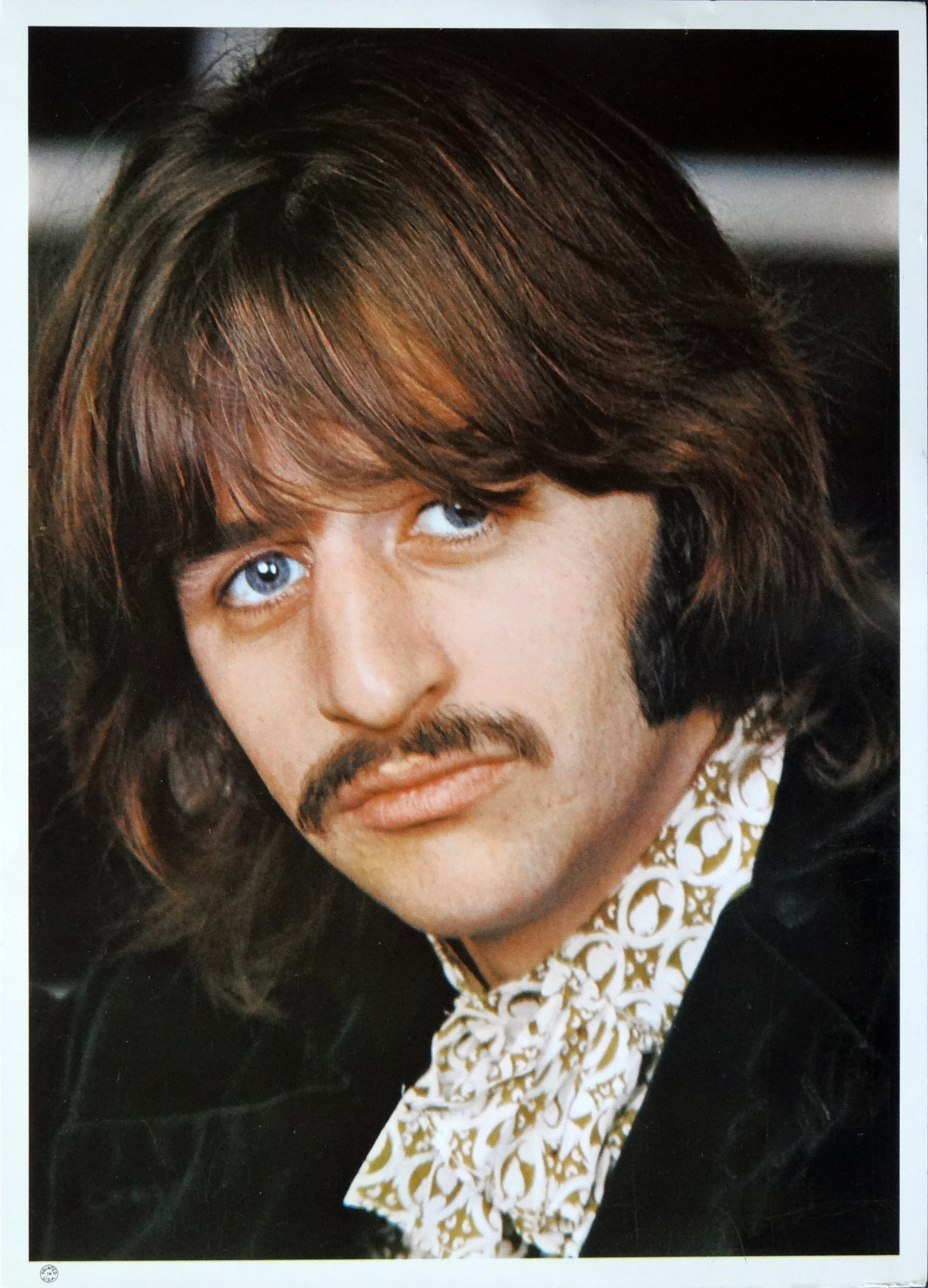
Ringo Starr, former drummer of the Beatles, played on several of Izitso's unreleased tracks.

"Yusuf said that he met Ringo at a hotel in Copenhagen, Denmark, and invited him down to a recording session for his album Izitso at Sweet Silence Studios in Copenhagen. He recalled that the party atmosphere of the sessions led to a jam of him singing 'Blue Monday' and 'I Just Want to Make Love to You,' with Ringo joining in on drums. The tracks were not proper takes, so they were never used, though Yusuf thinks he still has the tapes somewhere. He seems quite sure Ringo did not play on any of the tracks that ended up being used on the Izitso album."

Reflecting on the jam session in his memoir nearly 50 years later, Yusuf said the following:

“It wasn’t long into the making of Izitso that I discovered Ringo Starr was in town and staying in the very same hotel, so I invited him to the studio. It was a nervous moment for me, as the Beatles had been such a monster influence on my life and ambitions. The solution was to get suitably drunk- enough to be able to feel uninhibited but still remain in tune. After having a few goes at “(Remember the Days of the) Old Schoolyard”, it seemed the odd timings of the song were cramping Ringo’s style. I didn’t want him to feel let down, so we forgot about the album and simply jammed. The result was a hugely freeform musical party... Listening to those recordings, people can get an idea of how I wrote some of my songs. Words would be mumbled and jumbled together, repeating a chorus structure or riff, then later I’d return with my glasses on to try and make sense of them. One particular track that deserved to be revisited was “Waiting for the Sailor”. What the title meant was yet to be worked out, but it was a hot, catchy song in the bendy-Fender vein of Steve Miller, whom I respected greatly.”

He added that some tracks were around nine minutes long, and none were included on Izitso.

Starr expressed resentment at being "wiped" off Izitso at the time, though later moved past it, stating that he "[couldn't] blame [Stevens] because around those years, I was losing control!"

Also recorded in the sessions were: "Hang On Sloopy","Working in the Coal Mine", "Baby I Have Some Love for You", and "If I Have to Work for You." Bootleg copies of the sessions exist, commonly referred to as "Sink in the Can".

== Critical reception ==
Professional ratings
Review scores
Source	Rating
AllMusic	3/5 stars
The Rolling Stone Album Guide	1/5 stars

Upon its release, Rolling Stone praised the album for blending together elements of folk rock and electronic music, "often in apparent opposition to each other", with "the diversity and the maturity to match this seeming incongruity."

== Track listing ==
All tracks composed by Cat Stevens, except where indicated.

"(Remember the Days of the) Old Schoolyard"
A sample of "(Remember the Days of the) Old Schoolyard" from Izitso. It was an early example of synthpop and Cat Stevens' last top 40 hit single of the 1970s.

"Was Dog a Doughnut?"
A sample of "Was Dog a Doughnut?" from Izitso. It was one of the first examples of electro, or techno-pop.

=== Side one ===
1. "(Remember the Days of the) Old Schoolyard" – 2:44
2. "Life" – 4:56
3. "Killin' Time" – 3:30
4. "Kypros" (instrumental) – 3:10
5. "Bonfire" – 4:10

=== Side two ===
1. "(I Never Wanted) To Be a Star" – 3:03
2. "Crazy" – 3:33
3. "Sweet Jamaica" – 3:31
4. "Was Dog a Doughnut?" (instrumental) (Stevens, Bruce Lynch, Jean Roussel) – 4:15
5. "Child for a Day" (Paul Travis, David Gordon) – 4:23

== Personnel ==
- Cat Stevens – vocals, Epiphone Casino electric guitar, Ovation guitar, electric guitar, acoustic guitar, steel guitar, guitar synthesizer, bouzouki, piano, celesta, harpsichord, Wurlitzer electric piano, Fender Rhodes, Polymoog, Moog synthesizer, Minimoog, ARP String Synthesizer, ARP 2600, Yamaha CS-80, Yamaha GX-1, Yamaha EA5R electronic organ, music sequencer, drums, percussion, harmonica, brass arrangements
- Jean Roussel – Hammond organ, piano, organ, synthesizer, ARP String Synthesizer, Yamaha CS-80, glockenspiel, vibraphone, string and brass arrangements
- David Campbell – string and brass arrangements
- Chick Corea – electric piano on "Bonfire" and "Was Dog a Doughnut?"
- Barry Beckett – organ on "Killin' Time", piano and electric piano and "Child for a Day"
- Tim Henson – piano on "Killin' Time", organ on "Child for a Day"
- Broderick Smith – harmonica on "Sweet Jamaica"
- Marjorie Lagerwall – harp on "Sweet Jamaica"
- Ray Gomez – electric guitar on "Was Dog a Doughnut?"
- Pete Carr – electric guitar on "Killin' Time" and "Child for a Day"
- Jim Johnson – rhythm guitar on "Killin' Time"
- Weldon Myrick – steel guitar on "(I Never Wanted) to Be a Star"
- Reggie Young – electric guitar on "(I Never Wanted) to Be a Star"
- Bruce Lynch – bass guitar, music sequencer on "Was Dog a Doughnut?"
- David Hood – bass guitar on "Killin' Time" and "Child for a Day"
- Andy Newmark – drums and percussion on "(Remember the Days of the) Old Schoolyard" and "Kypros" and "Bonfire" and "Sweet Jamaica"
- Bill Berg – drums and percussion on "Life" and "(I Never Wanted) to Be a Star" and "Crazy"
- Barry Morgan – additional drums on "Life"
- Roger Hawkins – drums and percussion on "Killin' Time" and "Child for a Day"
- Elkie Brooks – vocals on "(Remember the Days of the) Old Schoolyard"
- Suzanne Lynch – backing vocals on "(Remember the Days of the) Old Schoolyard" and "Life" and "Sweet Jamaica"
- Carla Benson – backing vocals on "Sweet Jamaica"
- Evette Benton – backing vocals on "Sweet Jamaica"
- Barbara Ingram – backing vocals on "Sweet Jamaica"
- Gene Page – string and brass arrangements

== Production ==
- Producers – Cat Stevens, Dave Kershenbaum
- Engineers – Harvey Goldberg, Mike Stavros, Ian Boughey, Nigel Walker, Flemming Rasmussen, Tom Jung, Paul Martinson, Nick Blagona, Mike Ross, Freddy Hansson, Steve Brandon, Jerry Masters, Gene Eichelberger, Dee Robb, John Kelly, Ken Frieson
- Mastering – Ted Jensen, Bernie Grundman
- Mixing – Claude Dupras
- Design – Mathieu Bitton
- Programming – Cat Stevens, Claude Dupras
- Supervisor – Bill Levenson
- Illustrations – Cat Stevens
- Cover Designs – Cat Stevens, Eckford Stimpson
- Photography – Moshe Brakha
- Coordinator – Beth Stempel

== Charts ==
=== Weekly charts ===
Weekly chart performance for Izitso
Chart (1977)	Peak position
Australian Albums (Kent Music Report)	39
Austrian Albums (Ö3 Austria)	12
Canada Top Albums/CDs (RPM)	2
Dutch Albums (Album Top 100)	13
Finnish Albums (Suomen virallinen lista)	11
German Albums (Offizielle Top 100)	7
Italian Albums (Musica e Dischi)	7
New Zealand Albums (RMNZ)	39
Norwegian Albums (VG-lista)	13
Spanish Albums (AFE)	10
Swedish Albums (Sverigetopplistan)	15
UK Albums (Official Charts)	18
US Billboard 200	7

=== Year-end charts ===
Year-end chart performance for Izitso
Chart (1977)	Position
German Albums (Offizielle Top 100)	26

== Certifications and sales ==
Certifications and sales for Izitso
Region	Certification	Certified units/sales
Canada (Music Canada)	Gold	50,000^{^}
United Kingdom (BPI)	Silver	60,000^{^}
^{^} Shipments figures based on certification alone.
