= Synth-pop =

Music genre in which the synthesizer is the main instrument

- Other names: Techno-pop
- Stylistic origins: Electronic; pop; avant-garde; disco; new wave; progressive rock; krautrock; glam rock; Eurodisco; art pop
- Cultural origins: 1977–1980 in Germany, Japan, and the United Kingdom
- Derivative forms: Electropop; dance-pop; house; Italo disco; electro; techno; Detroit techno; alternative dance; futurepop; hypnagogic pop; chillwave

Fusion genres
- Electroclash

Other topics
- New musick; post-punk; new pop; synthwave; electronic rock

Synth-pop (short for synthesizer pop; also called techno-pop) is a music genre that first became prominent in the late 1970s and features the synthesizer as the dominant musical instrument. It was prefigured in the 1960s and early 1970s by the use of synthesizers in progressive rock, electronic, art rock, disco, and particularly the Krautrock of bands like Kraftwerk. It arose as a distinct genre in Japan and the United Kingdom in the post-punk era as part of the new wave movement of the late 1970s.

Electronic musical synthesizers that could be used practically in a recording studio became available in the mid-1960s, and the mid-1970s saw the rise of electronic art musicians. After the breakthrough of Gary Numan in the UK Singles Chart in 1979, large numbers of artists began to enjoy success with a synthesizer-based sound in the early 1980s. In Japan, Yellow Magic Orchestra introduced the TR-808 rhythm machine to popular music, and the band would be a major influence on early British synth-pop acts. The development of inexpensive polyphonic synthesizers, the definition of MIDI and the use of dance beats, led to a more commercial and accessible sound for synth-pop. Thus, its adoption by the style-conscious acts from the New Romantic movement, together with the rise of MTV, led to success for large numbers of British synth-pop acts in the US during the Second British Invasion.

The term "techno-pop" was coined by Yuzuru Agi in his critique of Kraftwerk's The Man-Machine in 1978 and is considered a case of multiple discovery of naming. Hence, the term can be used interchangeably with "synth-pop", but is more frequently used to describe the scene of Japan. The term "techno-pop" became also popular in Europe, where it started: German band Kraftwerk's 1986 album was titled Techno Pop; English band the Buggles has a song named "Technopop" and Spanish band Mecano described their style as tecno-pop.

"Synth-pop" is sometimes used interchangeably with "electropop", but "electropop" may also denote a variant of synth-pop that places more emphasis on a harder, more electronic sound. In the mid to late 1980s, duos such as Erasure and Pet Shop Boys adopted a style that was highly successful on the US dance charts, but by the end of the decade, the synth-pop of bands such as A-ha and Alphaville was giving way to house music and techno. Interest in synth-pop began to revive in the indietronica and electroclash movements in the late 1990s, and in the 2000s synth-pop enjoyed a widespread revival and commercial success.

The genre has received criticism for alleged lack of emotion and musicianship; prominent artists have spoken out against detractors who believed that synthesizers themselves composed and played the songs. Synth-pop music has established a place for the synthesizer as a major element of pop and rock music, directly influencing subsequent genres (including house music and Detroit techno) and has indirectly influenced many other genres, as well as individual recordings.

== Characteristics ==
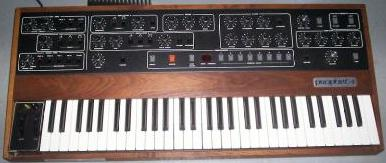
The Prophet-5, one of the first polyphonic synthesizers. It was widely used in 1980s synth-pop, along with the Roland Jupiter and Yamaha DX7.

Synth-pop is defined by its primary use of synthesizers, drum machines and sequencers, sometimes using them to replace all other instruments. Borthwick and Moy have described the genre as diverse but "characterised by a broad set of values that eschewed rock playing styles, rhythms and structures", which were replaced by "synthetic textures" and "robotic rigidity", often defined by the limitations of the new technology, including monophonic synthesizers (only able to play one note at a time).

Many synth-pop musicians had limited musical skills, relying on the technology to produce or reproduce the music. The result was often minimalist, with grooves that were "typically woven together from simple repeated riffs often with no harmonic 'progression' to speak of". Early synth-pop has been described as "eerie, sterile, and vaguely menacing", using droning electronics with little change in inflection. Common lyrical themes of synth-pop songs were isolation, urban anomie, and feelings of being emotionally cold and hollow.

In its second phase in the 1980s, the introduction of dance beats and more conventional rock instrumentation made the music warmer and catchier and contained within the conventions of three-minute pop. Synthesizers were increasingly used to imitate the conventional and clichéd sound of orchestras and horns. Thin, treble-dominant, synthesized melodies and simple drum programmes gave way to thick, and compressed production, and a more conventional drum sound. Lyrics were generally more optimistic, dealing with more traditional subject matter for pop music such as romance, escapism and aspiration. According to music writer Simon Reynolds, the hallmark of 1980s synth-pop was its "emotional, at times operatic singers" such as Marc Almond, Alison Moyet and Annie Lennox. Because synthesizers removed the need for large groups of musicians, these singers were often part of a duo where their partner played all the instrumentation.

Although synth-pop in part arose from punk rock, it abandoned punk's emphasis on authenticity and often pursued a deliberate artificiality, drawing on the critically derided forms such as disco and glam rock. It owed relatively little to the foundations of early popular music in jazz, folk music or the blues, and instead of looking to America, in its early stages, it consciously focused on European and particularly Eastern European influences, which were reflected in band names like Spandau Ballet and songs like Ultravox's "Vienna". Later synth-pop saw a shift to a style more influenced by other genres, such as soul music.

== History ==
=== Precursors ===
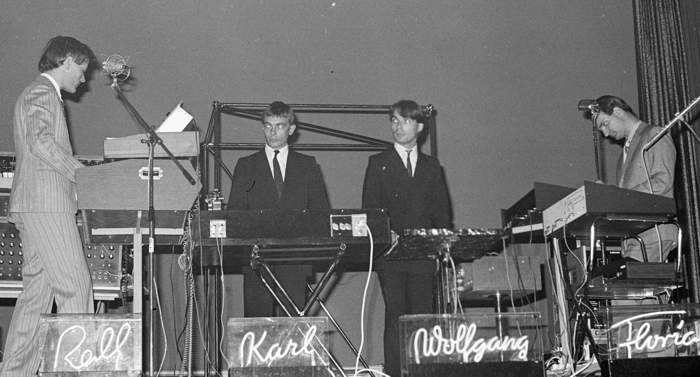
Kraftwerk, one of the major influences on synth-pop, in 1976

Electronic musical synthesizers that could be used practically in a recording studio became available in the mid-1960s, around the same time as rock music began to emerge as a distinct musical genre. The Mellotron, an electro-mechanical, polyphonic sample-playback keyboard was overtaken by the Moog synthesizer, created by Robert Moog in 1964, which produced completely electronically generated sounds. The portable Minimoog, which allowed much easier use, particularly in live performance was widely adopted by progressive rock musicians such as Richard Wright of Pink Floyd and Rick Wakeman of Yes. Instrumental prog rock was particularly significant in continental Europe, allowing bands like Kraftwerk, Tangerine Dream, Can and Faust to circumvent the language barrier. Their synthesizer-heavy "Kraut rock", along with the work of Brian Eno (for a time the keyboard player with Roxy Music), would be a major influence on subsequent synth rock.

In 1971, the British film A Clockwork Orange was released with a synth soundtrack by American Wendy Carlos. It was the first time many in the United Kingdom had heard electronic music. Philip Oakey of the Human League and Richard H. Kirk of Cabaret Voltaire, as well as music journalist Simon Reynolds, have cited the soundtrack as an inspiration. Electronic music made occasional moves into the mainstream, with jazz musician Stan Free, under the pseudonym Hot Butter, having a top 10 hit in the United States and United Kingdom in 1972, with a cover of the 1969 Gershon Kingsley song "Popcorn" using a Moog synthesizer, which is recognised as a forerunner to synth-pop and disco.

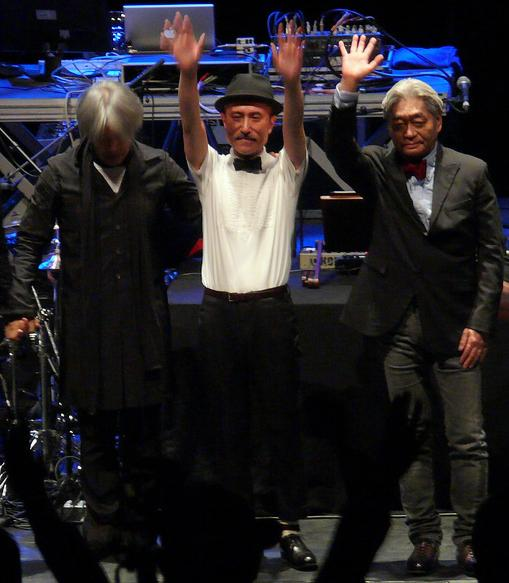
Yellow Magic Orchestra in 2008

The mid-1970s saw the rise of electronic art musicians such as Jean Michel Jarre, Vangelis, and Tomita. Tomita's album Electric Samurai: Switched on Rock (1972) featured electronic renditions of contemporary rock and pop songs, while utilizing speech synthesis and analog music sequencers. In 1975, Kraftwerk played their first British show and inspired concert attendees Andy McCluskey and Paul Humphreys – who would later found Orchestral Manoeuvres in the Dark (OMD) – to 'throw away their guitars' and become a synth act. Kraftwerk had its first hit UK record later in the year with "Autobahn", which reached number 11 in the British Singles Chart and number 12 in Canada. The group was described by the BBC Four program Synth Britannia as the key to synth-pop's future rise there. In 1977, Giorgio Moroder released the electronic Eurodisco song "I Feel Love" that he had produced for Donna Summer, and its programmed beats would be a major influence on the later synth-pop sound. David Bowie's Berlin Trilogy, comprising the albums Low (1977), "Heroes" (1977), and Lodger (1979), all featuring Brian Eno, would also be highly influential.

The Cat Stevens album Izitso, released in April 1977, updated his pop rock style with the extensive use of synthesizers, giving it a more synth-pop style; "Was Dog a Doughnut?" in particular was an early techno-pop fusion track, which made early use of a music sequencer. Izitso reached No. 7 on the Billboard 200 chart, while the song "(Remember the Days of the) Old Schoolyard" was a top 40 hit. That same month, the Beach Boys released their album Love You, performed almost entirely by bandleader Brian Wilson with Moog and ARP synthesizers, and with arrangements somewhat inspired by Wendy Carlos's Switched-On Bach (1968). Although it was highly praised by some critics and musicians (including Patti Smith and Lester Bangs), the album met with poor commercial reception. The album has been considered revolutionary in its use of synthesizers, while others described Wilson's extensive use of the Moog synthesizer as a "loopy funhouse ambience" and an early example of synth-pop.

=== Origins: New wave and post-punk (1977–1980) ===
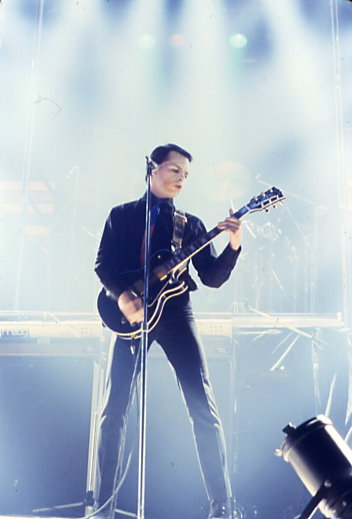
Gary Numan performing in 1980

Early guitar-based punk rock that came to prominence in the period 1976–77 was initially hostile to the "inauthentic" sound of the synthesizer, but many new wave and post-punk bands that emerged from the movement began to adopt it as a major part of their sound. British punk and new wave clubs were open to what was then considered an "alternative" sound. The do it yourself attitude of punk broke down the progressive rock era's norm of needing years of experience before getting up on stage to play synthesizers. The American duo Suicide, who arose from the post-punk scene in New York, utilised drum machines and synthesizers in a hybrid between electronics and post-punk on their eponymous 1977 album. Around this time, Ultravox member Warren Cann purchased a Roland TR-77 drum machine, which was first featured in their October 1977 single release "Hiroshima Mon Amour".

Be-Bop Deluxe released Drastic Plastic in February 1978, leading off with the single "Electrical Language" with Bill Nelson on guitar synthesizer and Andy Clark on synthesizers. Japanese band Yellow Magic Orchestra (YMO) with their self-titled album (1978) and Solid State Survivor (1979), developed a "fun-loving and breezy" sound, with a strong emphasis on melody. They introduced the TR-808 rhythm machine to popular music, and the band would be a major influence on early British synth-pop acts.

1978 also saw the release of UK band the Human League's debut single "Being Boiled" and The Normal's "Warm Leatherette", which both are regarded as seminal works in early synth-pop. Sheffield band Cabaret Voltaire are also regarded as pioneers of the late 1970s that influenced the emerging synth-pop in Britain. In America, post-punk band Devo began moving towards a more electronic sound. At this point synth-pop gained some critical attention, but made little impact on the commercial charts.

"This is a finger, this is another... now write a song"

— This quote is a take on the punk manifesto This is a chord, this is another, this is a third...now start a band celebrating the virtues of amateur musicianship first appeared in a fanzine in December 1976.

British punk-influenced band Tubeway Army, intended their debut album to be guitar driven. In late 1978, Gary Numan, a member of the group, found a minimoog left behind in the studio by another band, and started experimenting with it. This led to a change in the album's sound to electronic new wave. Numan later described his work on this album as a guitarist playing keyboards, who turned "punk songs into electronic songs". A single from the second Tubeway Army album Replicas, "Are Friends Electric?", topped the UK charts in the summer of 1979. The discovery that synthesizers could be employed in a different manner from that used in progressive rock or disco, prompted Numan to go solo. On his futuristic album The Pleasure Principle (1979), he played only synths, but retained a bass guitarist and a drummer for the rhythm section. A single from the album, "Cars" topped the charts.

Numan's main influence at the time was the John Foxx-led new wave band Ultravox who released the album Systems of Romance in 1978. Foxx left Ultravox the following year and scored a synth-pop hit with the single "Underpass" from his first solo album Metamatic in early 1980.

In 1979, OMD released their debut single "Electricity", which has been viewed as integral to the rise of synth-pop. This was followed by a series of key releases within the genre, including the 1980 hit singles "Messages" and "Enola Gay". OMD were Britain's first performing "synth duo", and one of the more influential acts of the period. Vince Clarke, who co-founded the popular synth-pop groups Depeche Mode, Erasure, Yazoo and the Assembly, has cited OMD as his inspiration to become an electronic musician. Bandleaders Andy McCluskey and Paul Humphreys have been described as the "Lennon–McCartney of synth-pop".

Giorgio Moroder collaborated with the band Sparks on their album No. 1 In Heaven (1979). That same year in Japan, the synth-pop band P-Model made its debut with the album In a Model Room. Other Japanese synth-pop groups emerging around the same time included the Plastics and Hikashu. This zeitgeist of revolution in electronic music performance and recording/production was encapsulated by then would-be record producer Trevor Horn of the Buggles in the single "Video Killed the Radio Star"; the song topped the UK charts in October 1979 and it also became an international hit; two years later it was the first song aired on MTV. Geoff Downes, keyboardist for the Buggles, stated, "When we did a rerecorded version for Top of the Pops, the Musicians' Union bloke said, "If I think you're making strings sounds out of a synthesizer, I'm going to have you. 'Video Killed the Radio Star' is putting musicians out of business."

1980 also saw the release of where "Video Killed the Radio Star" came from, the Buggles' debut album The Age of Plastic, which some writers have labeled as the first landmark of another electropop era, as well as what for many is the defining album of Devo's career, the overtly synth-pop Freedom of Choice.

=== Commercial success (1981–1985) ===
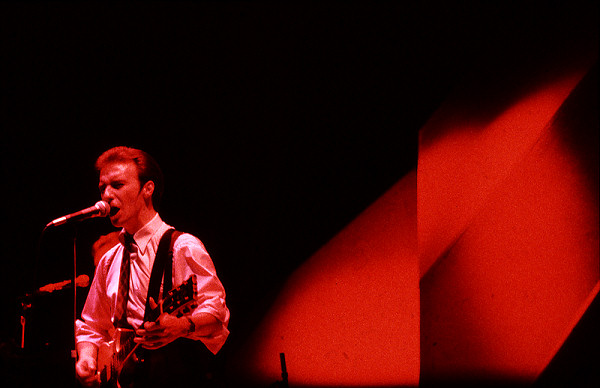
Midge Ure performing with Ultravox in Oslo in 1981

The emergence of synth-pop has been described as "perhaps the single most significant event in melodic music since Mersey-beat". By the 1980s synthesizers had become much cheaper and easier to use. After the definition of MIDI in 1982 and the development of digital audio, the creation of purely electronic sounds and their manipulation became much simpler. Synthesizers came to dominate the pop music of the early 1980s, particularly through their adoption by bands of the New Romantic movement. Despite synth-pop's origins in the late 1970s among new wave bands like Tubeway Army and Devo, British journalists and music critics largely abandoned the term "new wave" in the early 1980s. This was in part due to the rise of new artists unaffiliated with the preceding punk/new wave era, as well as aesthetic changes associated with synth-pop's movement into the pop mainstream. According to authors Stuart Borthwick and Ron Moy, "After the monochrome blacks and greys of punk/new wave, synthpop was promoted by a youth media interested in people who wanted to be pop stars, such as Boy George and Adam Ant".

The New Romantic scene had developed in the London nightclubs Billy's and the Blitz and was associated with bands such as Duran Duran, Visage, and Spandau Ballet. They adopted an elaborate visual style that combined elements of glam rock, science fiction and romanticism. Spandau Ballet were the first band of the movement to have a hit single as the synth-driven "To Cut a Long Story Short" reached number 5 on the UK Singles Chart in December 1980. Visage's "Fade to Grey", characteristic of synth-pop and a major influence on the genre, reached the top ten a few weeks later. Duran Duran have been credited with incorporating dance beats into synth-pop to produce a catchier and warmer sound, which provided them with a series of hit singles, beginning with their debut single "Planet Earth" and the UK top five hit "Girls on Film" in 1981. They would soon be followed into the British charts by a large number of bands utilising synthesizers to create catchy three-minute pop songs. In summer 1981 Depeche Mode had their first chart success with "New Life", followed by the UK top ten hit "Just Can't Get Enough". A new line-up for the Human League along with a new producer and a more commercial sound led to the album Dare (1981), which produced a series of hit singles. These included "Don't You Want Me", which reached number one in the UK at the end of 1981.

Synth-pop reached its commercial peak in the UK in the winter of 1981–2, with bands such as OMD, Japan, Ultravox, Soft Cell, Depeche Mode, Yazoo and even Kraftwerk, enjoying top ten hits. The Human League's and Soft Cell's UK number one singles "Don't You Want Me" and "Tainted Love" became the best selling singles in the UK in 1981. In early 1982 synthesizers were so dominant that the Musicians' Union attempted to limit their use. By the end of 1982, these acts had been joined in the charts by synth-based singles from Thomas Dolby, Blancmange, and Tears for Fears. Bands such as Simple Minds also adopted synth-pop into their music on their 1982 album New Gold Dream (81–82–83–84). ABC and Heaven 17 had commercial success mixing synth-pop with influences from funk and soul music.

Dutch entertainer Taco, who has a background in musical theatre, released his own synth-driven re-imagining of Irving Berlin's "Puttin' On the Ritz"; resulting in a subsequent long-play, After Eight, a concept album that takes music of 1930s sensibilities as informed by the soundscape of 1980s technology. The proliferation of acts led to an anti-synth backlash, with groups including Spandau Ballet, Human League, Soft Cell and ABC incorporating more conventional influences and instruments into their sounds.

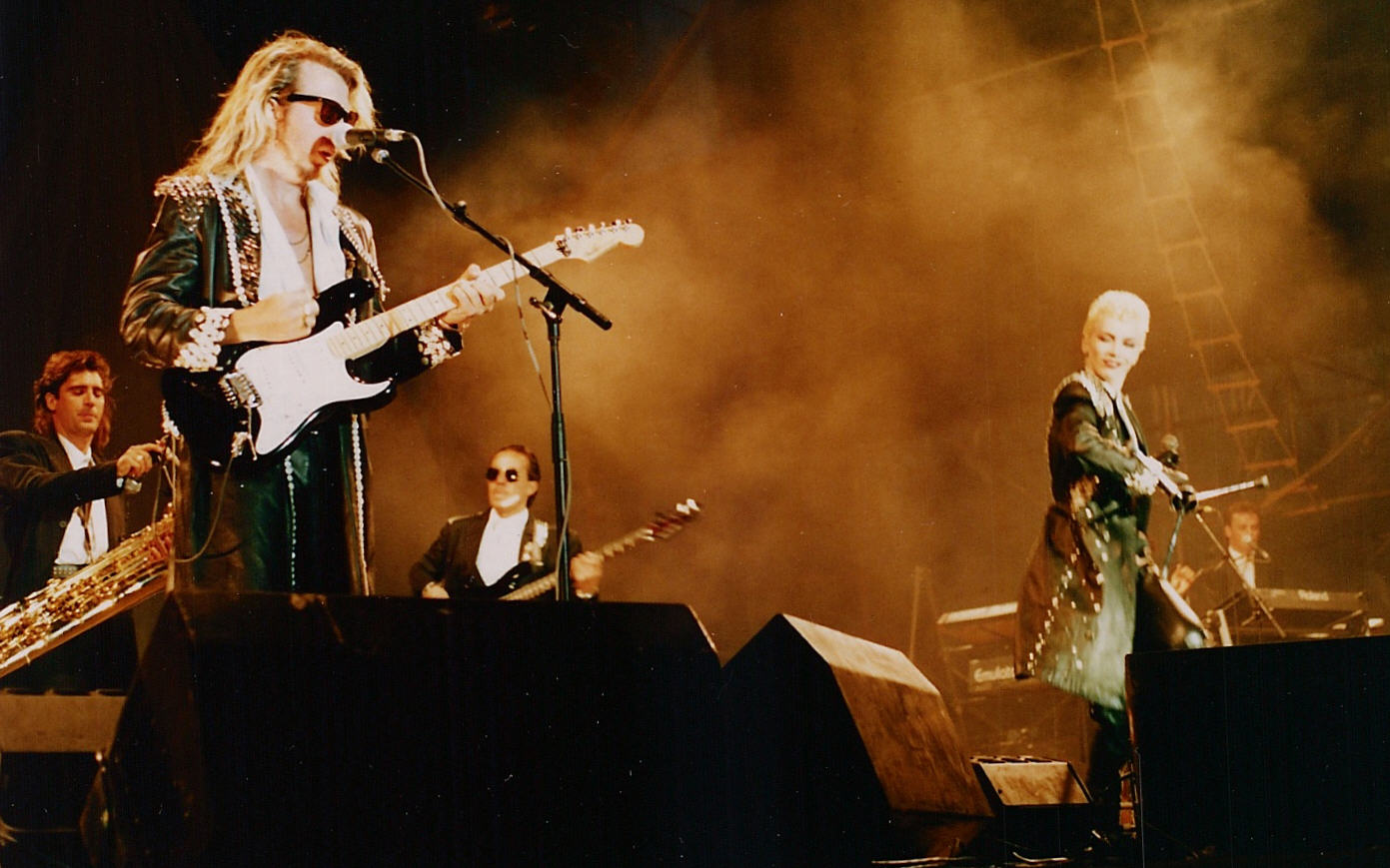
Eurythmics (Dave Stewart and Annie Lennox) on stage in Germany in 1987

In the US (unlike the UK), where synth-pop is sometimes considered a "subgenre" of "new wave" and was described as "technopop" or "electropop" by the press at the time, the genre became popular due to the cable music channel MTV, which reached the media capitals of New York City and Los Angeles in 1982. It made heavy use of style-conscious New Romantic synth-pop acts, with "I Ran (So Far Away)" (1982) by A Flock of Seagulls generally considered the first hit by a British act to enter the Billboard top ten as a result of exposure through video. The switch to a "new music" format in US radio stations was also significant in the success of British bands. Reaching No. 2 in the UK in March 1983 and No. 1 on the US Billboard Hot 100 six months later, Rolling Stone called Eurythmics' single "Sweet Dreams (Are Made of This)" "a synth-pop masterpiece". Bananarama's 1983 synth-pop song "Cruel Summer" became an instant UK hit before having similar success in the US the following year. The success of synth-pop and other British acts would be seen as a Second British Invasion. In his early 1980s columns for The Village Voice, music critic Robert Christgau frequently referred to British synth-pop as "Anglodisco", suggesting a parallel to the contemporary genres of Eurodisco and Italo disco, both highly popular outside the US. Indeed, synth-pop was taken up across the world alongside the continuing presence of disco, with international hits for German synth-pop as well as Eurodisco acts including Peter Schilling, Sandra, Modern Talking, Propaganda, and Alphaville. Other non-British groups scoring synth-pop hits were Men Without Hats and Trans-X from Canada, Telex from Belgium, Yello from Switzerland, and Azul y Negro from Spain. Among a slew of European groups, Berlin were a rare example of a successful American synth-pop band at this time, though their name nodded to their music's European influences: as with other bands in the genre their breakthrough was aided by heavy rotation on MTV and California new wave station KROQ-FM. The synth-pop scene of Yugoslavia spawned a large number of acts, a number of them enjoying huge mainstream popularity in the country, like Beograd, Laki Pingvini, Denis & Denis, and Videosex.

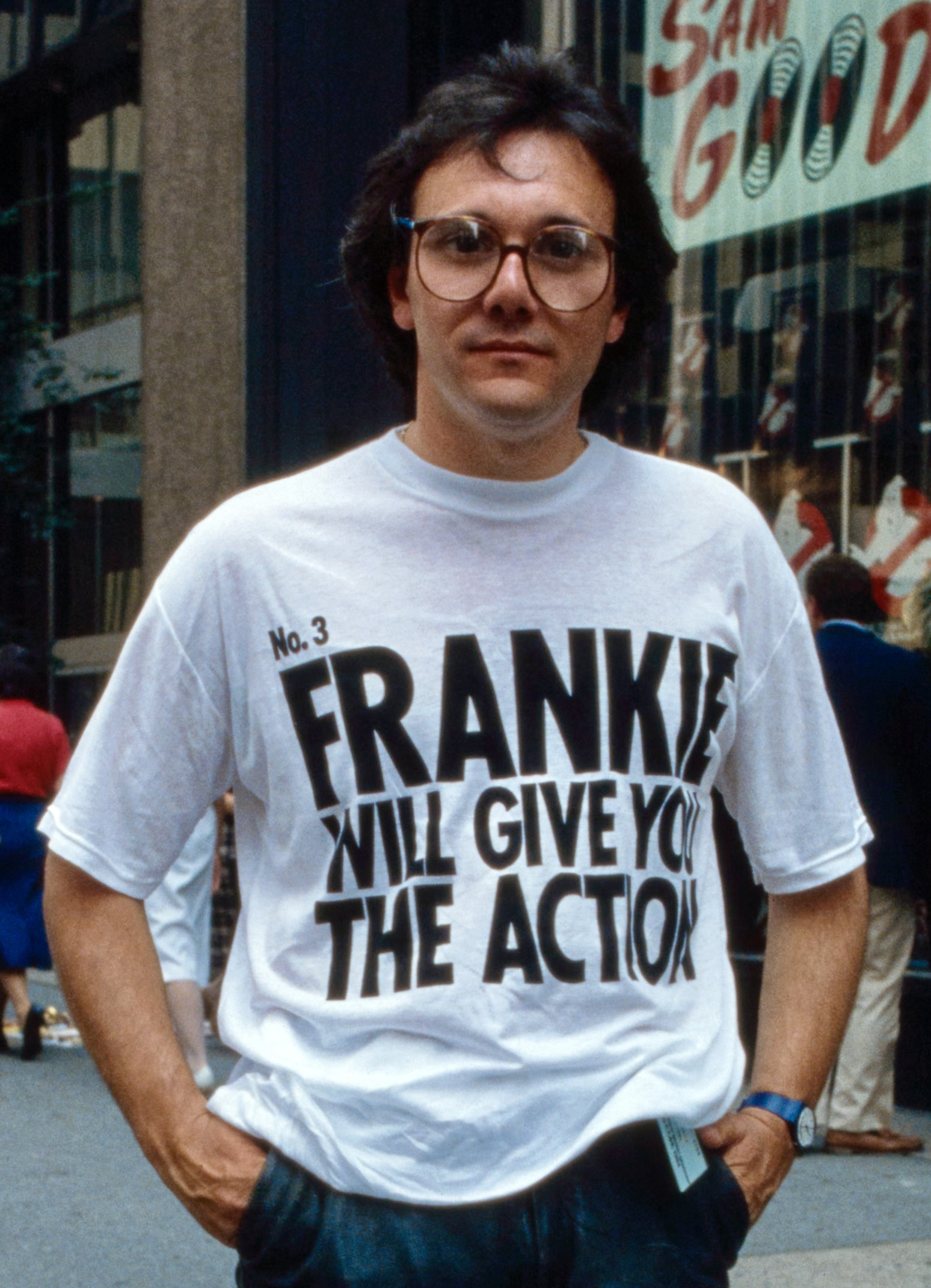
Trevor Horn (pictured in 1984), frontman of British new wave synth-pop group the Buggles, also produced Frankie Goes to Hollywood's 1984 album Welcome to the Pleasuredome.

In the mid-1980s, key artists included solo performer Howard Jones, who S.T. Erlewine has stated to have "merged the technology-intensive sound of new wave with the cheery optimism of hippies and late-'60s pop", (although with notable exceptions including the lyrics of "What Is Love?" – "Does anybody love anybody anyway?") and Nik Kershaw, whose "well-crafted synth-pop" incorporated guitars and other more traditional pop influences that particularly appealed to a teen audience. Pursuing a more dance-orientated sound were Bronski Beat whose album The Age of Consent (1984), dealing with issues of homophobia and alienation, reached the top 20 in the UK and top 40 in the US. and Thompson Twins, whose popularity peaked in 1984 with the album Into the Gap, which reached No.1 in the UK and the US top ten and spawned several top ten singles. In 1984, Frankie Goes to Hollywood released their debut album Welcome to the Pleasuredome (produced by Trevor Horn of the Buggles), with their first three singles, "Relax", "Two Tribes" and "The Power of Love", topping the UK chart. The music journalist Paul Lester reflected, "no band has dominated a 12-month period like Frankie ruled 1984". In January 1985, Tears for Fears' single "Shout", written by Roland Orzabal in his "front room on just a small synthesizer and a drum machine", became their fourth top 5 UK hit; it would later top the charts in multiple countries including the US. Initially dismissed in the music press as a "teeny bop sensation" were Norwegian band a-ha, whose use of guitars and real drums produced an accessible form of synth-pop, which, along with an MTV friendly video, took their 1985 single "Take On Me" to number two in the UK and number one in the US.

=== Declining popularity (1986–2000) ===
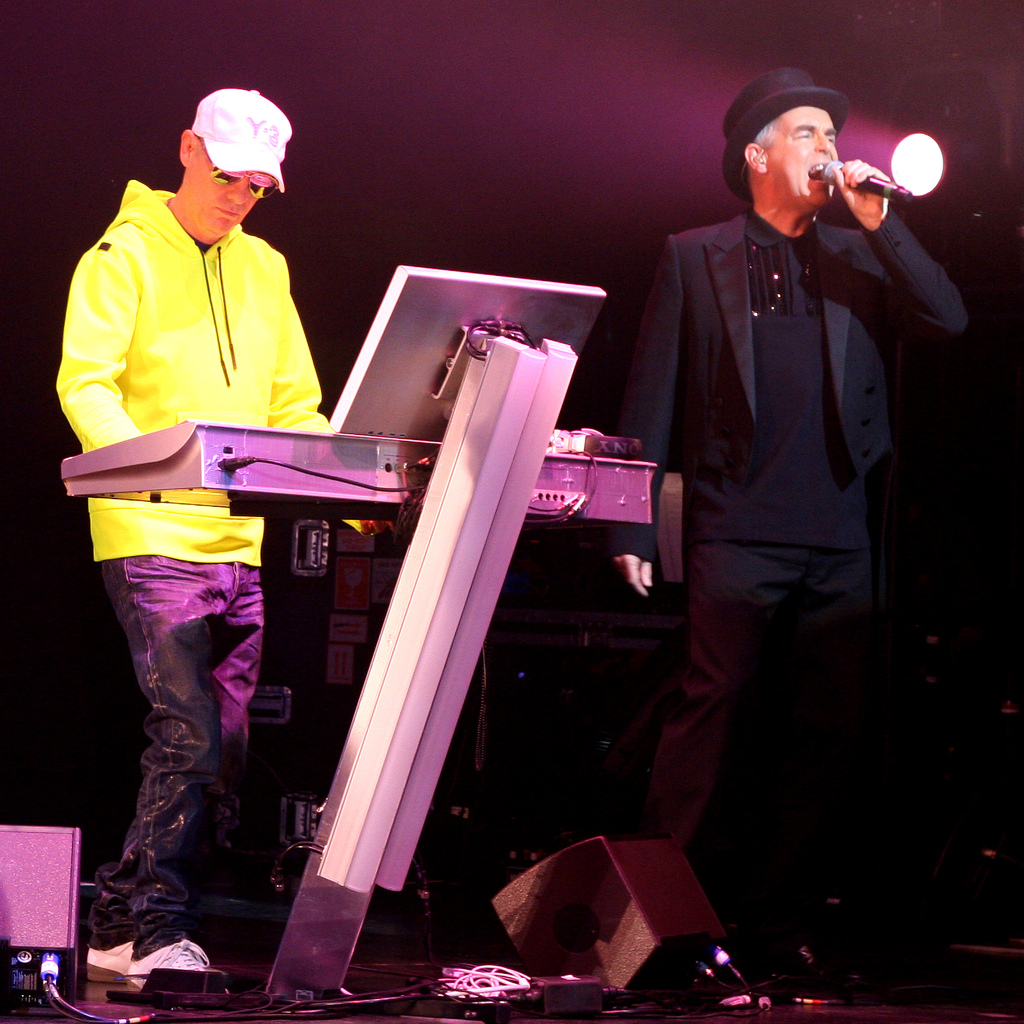
The Pet Shop Boys performing in 2006

Synth-pop continued into the late 1980s, with a format that moved closer to dance music, including the work of acts such as British duos Pet Shop Boys, Erasure and the Communards. The Communards' major hits were covers of disco classics "Don't Leave Me This Way" (1986) and "Never Can Say Goodbye" (1987). After adding other elements to their sound, and with the help of a gay audience, several synth-pop acts had success on the US dance charts. Among these were American acts Information Society (who had two top 10 singles in 1988), Anything Box, and Red Flag. British band When in Rome scored a hit with their debut single "The Promise". Several German synth-pop acts of the late 1980s included Camouflage and Celebrate the Nun. Canadian duo Kon Kan had major success with their debut single, "I Beg Your Pardon" in 1989.

An American backlash against European synth-pop has been seen as beginning in the mid-1980s with the rise of heartland rock and roots rock. Synth-pop was also eclipsed at this time by funk rock and dance-rock, as exemplified by INXS and Prince's Minneapolis sound. Duran Duran moved in this direction with their Nile Rodgers-produced 1986 album Notorious, which followed the 1985 release of the debut album by The Power Station, a funk-rock side project featuring continuing and soon-to-depart Duran Duran members John and Andy Taylor alongside Robert Palmer and Rogers' ex-Chic bandmates Tony Thompson and Bernard Edwards. In the UK the arrival of indie rock bands, particularly the Smiths, has been seen as marking the end of synth-driven pop and the beginning of the guitar-based music that would dominate rock into the 1990s. By 1991, in the United States synth-pop was losing its commercial viability as alternative radio stations were responding to the popularity of grunge. Exceptions that continued to pursue forms of synth-pop or rock in the 1990s were Savage Garden, the Rentals and the Moog Cookbook. Electronic music was also explored from the early 1990s by indietronica bands like Stereolab, EMF, the Utah Saints, and Disco Inferno, who mixed a variety of indie and synthesizer sounds.

=== 21st-century revival (2000s–present) ===
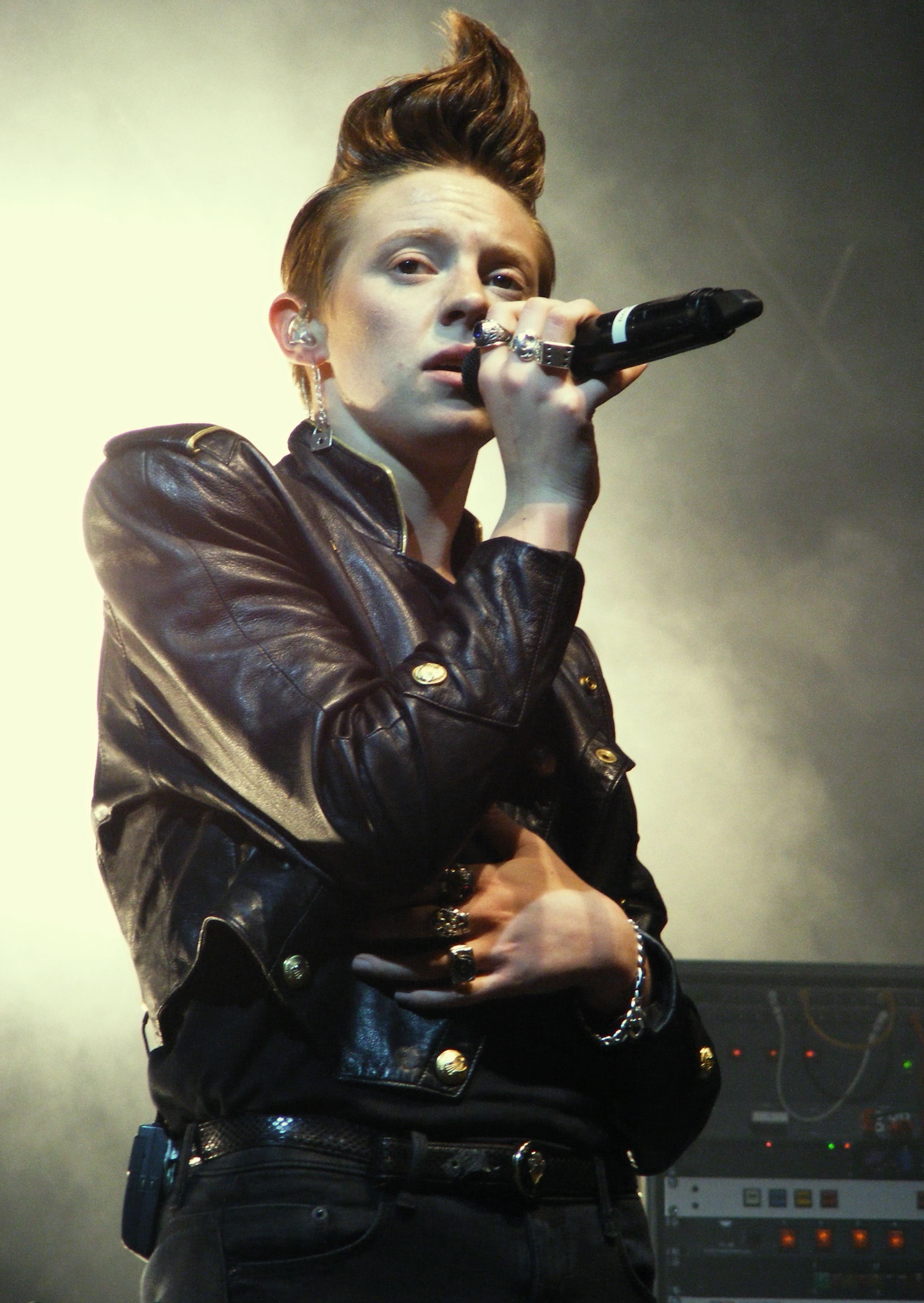
Elly Jackson of La Roux performing in 2010

Indietronica began to take off in the new millennium as the new digital technology developed, with acts such as Broadcast from the UK, Justice from France, Lali Puna from Germany, and Ratatat and the Postal Service from the US, mixing a variety of indie sounds with electronic music, largely produced on small independent labels. Similarly, the electroclash subgenre began in New York at the end of the 1990s, combining synth-pop, techno, punk and performance art. It was pioneered by I-F with their track "Space Invaders Are Smoking Grass" (1998), and pursued by artists including Felix da Housecat, Peaches, Chicks on Speed, and Fischerspooner. It gained international attention at the beginning of the new millennium and spread to scenes in London and Berlin, but rapidly faded as a recognizable genre as acts began to experiment with a variety of forms of music.

In the new millennium, renewed interest in electronic music and nostalgia for the 1980s led to the beginnings of a synth-pop revival, with acts including Adult and Fischerspooner. Between 2003 and 2004, it began to move into the mainstream with Ladytron, the Postal Service, Cut Copy, the Bravery and the Killers all producing records that incorporated vintage synthesizer sounds and styles that contrasted with the dominant genres of post-grunge and nu metal. In particular, the Killers enjoyed considerable airplay and exposure and their debut album Hot Fuss (2004) reached the top ten of the Billboard 200. The Killers, the Bravery and the Stills all left their synth-pop sound behind after their debut albums and began to explore classic 1970s rock, but the style was picked up by a large number of performers, particularly female solo artists. Following the breakthrough success of Lady Gaga with her single "Just Dance" (2008), the British and other media proclaimed a new era of female synth-pop stars, citing artists such as Little Boots, La Roux, and Ladyhawke. Male acts that emerged in the same period include Calvin Harris, Empire of the Sun, Frankmusik, Hurts, Ou Est Le Swimming Pool, Kaskade, LMFAO, and Owl City, whose single "Fireflies" (2009) topped the Billboard Hot 100 chart. In 2009, an underground subgenre with direct stylistic origins to synth-pop became popular, chillwave. Other 2010s synth-pop acts include the Naked and Famous, Chvrches, M83, and Shiny Toy Guns.

American singer Kesha has also been described as an electropop artist, with her electropop debut single "Tik Tok" topping the Billboard Hot 100 for nine weeks in 2010. She also used the genre on her comeback single "Die Young". Mainstream female recording artists who have dabbled in the genre in the 2010s include Madonna, Taylor Swift, Katy Perry, Jessie J, Christina Aguilera, and Beyoncé.

In Japan, girl group Perfume, along with producer Yasutaka Nakata of Capsule, produced technopop music combining 1980s synth-pop with chiptunes and electro house from 2003. Their breakthrough came in 2008 with the album Game, which led to a renewed interest in technopop within mainstream Japanese pop music. Other Japanese female technopop artists soon followed, including Aira Mitsuki, immi, Mizca, SAWA, Saori Rinne and Sweet Vacation. Model-singer Kyary Pamyu Pamyu also shared the same success as Perfume's under Nakata's production with the album Pamyu Pamyu Revolution in 2012, which topped electronic charts on iTunes as well as the Japanese Albums chart. Much like Japan, Korean pop music has also become dominated by synth-pop, particularly with girl groups such as f(x), Girls' Generation and Wonder Girls.

In 2020, the genre experienced a resurgence in popularity as 1980s-style synth-pop and synthwave songs from singers such as the Weeknd who gained success on international music charts. "Blinding Lights", a synthwave song by the Weeknd, peaked at number one in 29 countries, including the United States, in early 2020; and later became the Billboard number-one greatest song of all time in November 2021. This wave of revival not only popularized established acts but also enabled new artists like Dua Lipa, whose retro-influenced album Future Nostalgia won multiple awards and was hailed for its energetic embrace of vintage pop sounds. Meanwhile, indie artists such as M83 continued to explore the boundaries of the genre, blending it with shoegaze and ambient music to create a complex, layered sound in their album Digital Shades Vol. 2. The genre's adaptability and nostalgic appeal have contributed to its enduring presence and continued evolution in the music industry.

== Criticism and controversy ==
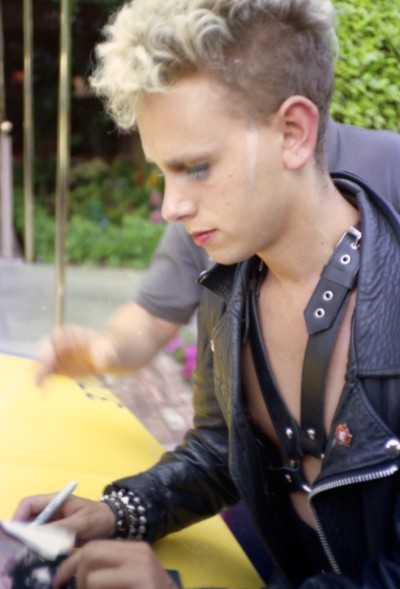
Martin Gore of Depeche Mode in 1986, wearing some of the fashions that were criticised for gender bending

Synth-pop has received considerable criticism and even prompted hostility among musicians and in the press. It has been described as "anaemic" and "soulless". Synth-pop's early steps – Gary Numan in particular – were also disparaged in the British music press of the late 1970s and early 1980s for their German influences, and were characterised by journalist Mick Farren as the "Adolf Hitler Memorial Space Patrol". During the 1980s, objections were raised to the quality of compositions and the supposed limited musicianship of artists. Numan observed "hostility" and "ignorance" toward synth-pop, claiming that "people didn't think it was real music; they thought machines did it".

OMD frontman Andy McCluskey recalled a great many people "who thought that the equipment wrote the song for you", and asserted: "Believe me, if there was a button on a synth or a drum machine that said 'hit single', I would have pressed it as often as anybody else would have – but there isn't. It was all written by real human beings".

According to Simon Reynolds, in some quarters synthesizers were seen as instruments for "effete poseurs", in contrast to the phallic guitar. The association of synth-pop with an alternative sexuality was reinforced by the images projected by synth-pop stars, who were seen as gender bending, including Phil Oakey's asymmetric hair and use of eyeliner, Marc Almond's "pervy" leather jacket, skirt wearing by figures including Martin Gore of Depeche Mode and the early "dominatrix" image of the Eurythmics' Annie Lennox. In the U.S. this led to British synth-pop artists being characterised as "English haircut bands" or "art fag" music, though many British synth-pop artists were highly popular on both American radio and MTV. Although some audiences were overtly hostile to synth-pop, it achieved an appeal among those alienated from the dominant heterosexuality of mainstream rock culture, particularly among gay, female and introverted audiences.

== Influence and legacy ==
By the mid-1980s, synth-pop had helped establish the synthesizer as a primary instrument in mainstream pop music. It also influenced the sound of many mainstream rock acts, such as Bruce Springsteen, ZZ Top and Van Halen. It was a major influence on house music, which grew out of the post-disco dance club culture of the early 1980s as some DJs attempted to make the less pop-oriented music that also incorporated influences from Latin soul, dub, rap music, and jazz.

American musicians such as Juan Atkins, using names including Model 500, Infinity and as part of Cybotron, developed a style of electronic dance music influenced by synth-pop and funk that led to the emergence of Detroit techno in the mid-1980s. The continued influence of 1980s synth-pop could be seen in various incarnations of 1990s dance music, including trance. Hip hop artists such as Mobb Deep have sampled 1980s synth-pop songs. Popular artists such as Rihanna, UK stars Jay Sean and Taio Cruz, as well as British pop star Lily Allen on her second album, have also embraced the genre.

In a retrospective article for The Guardian, music critic Dorian Lynskey identified 1981 as synth-pop's "annus mirabilis", citing six key albums released that year: OMD's Architecture & Morality, Depeche Mode's Speak & Spell, Soft Cell's Non-Stop Erotic Cabaret, Japan's Tin Drum, the Human League's Dare, and Heaven 17's Penthouse and Pavement. Lynskey's position was later mirrored by Matthew Lindsay of Classic Pop.

== See also ==
- New musick
- Dance-pop
- Electropop
- Schaffel beat, triplet feel popularised in electronic music
- Synthwave
- Wonky pop
- Chillwave
- Vaporwave

== Sources ==
- S. Borthwick and R. Moy (2004), Popular Music Genres: an Introduction, Edinburgh: Edinburgh University Press
- P. Bussy (2004), Kraftwerk: Man, Machine and Music (3rd ed.), London: SAF
- T. Cateforis (2011), Are We Not New Wave?: Modern Pop at the Turn of the 1980s, Ann Arbor MI: University of Michigan Press
- Collins, Nick; Schedel, Margaret; Wilson, Scott (2013). Electronic Music. Cambridge University Press. ISBN 978-1-107-24454-2.
- Hoffmann, Frank (2004). Encyclopedia of Recorded Sound. Routledge. ISBN 978-1-135-94950-1.
- Jones, Hollin (2006). Music Projects with Propellerhead Reason: Grooves, Beats and Styles from Trip Hop to Techno. PC Publishing. ISBN 978-1-870775-14-4.
- B. R. Parker (2009), Good Vibrations: the Physics of Music, Boston MD: JHU Press
- Simon Reynolds (2005), Rip It Up and Start Again Postpunk 1978–1984, London: Faber and Faber
- J. Stuessy and S. D. Lipscomb (2008), Rock and Roll: its History and Stylistic Development (6th ed.), London: Pearson Prentice Hall
- Trynka, Paul; Bacon, Tony, eds. (1996). Rock Hardware. Balafon Books. ISBN 978-0-87930-428-7.
