= I'm Gonna Get Me a Gun =

1967 song by Cat Stevens

- Dutch picture sleeve

Single by Cat Stevens
- B-side: "School is Out"
- Released: 23 March 1967
- Recorded: 23 January 1967
- Studio: Decca, London
- Genre: Baroque pop; folk pop; music hall; orchestral pop
- Length: 2:11
- Label: Deram
- Songwriter: Cat Stevens
- Producer: Mike Hurst

Cat Stevens singles chronology
"Matthew and Son" (1966)	"I'm Gonna Get Me a Gun" (1967)	"A Bad Night" (1967)

Audio
- "I'm Gonna Get Me a Gun" on YouTube

"I'm Gonna Get Me A Gun" is a song written and recorded by British singer-songwriter Cat Stevens in 1967. The song was written as a response to the sudden fame he had achieved with the success of his second single "Matthew and Son" (1966), and had its stylistic origins in a West End musical he had written about Billy the Kid. Together with a plethora of other tracks, "I'm Gonna Get Me a Gun" was recorded at Decca Studios in West Hampstead on 23 January 1967 together with producer Mike Hurst and music director Alan Tew.

The structure and elements of "I'm Gonna Get Me a Gun" were inspired by the songs of Leonard Bernstein, one of Stevens' childhood influences. It is a heavily orchestrated track with influences from folk-pop and music hall. The song's controversial lyrics regard a man who's tired of being demoralised and decides to take revenge on all who have wronged him by shooting them with a revolver.

Deram Records released "I'm Gonna Get Me a Gun" as a single on 23 March 1967, with "School is Out" as the B-side. The lyrical content caused controversy when the single was aired on Juke Box Jury, with fear it would incite violence. Nonetheless, "I'm Gonna Get Me a Gun" was a commercial success, reaching number six on the Record Retailer chart in the UK and was a top-ten hit in three other countries. It was featured on the US edition of his debut album Matthew and Son. Upon release, the single received praise, with critics lauding the production, though some found the lyrics to be violent or discerning.

== Background and recording ==
On 30 December 1966, Cat Stevens released his second single "Matthew and Son". (Note: Catalogue Deram DM 110.) It became Stevens' breakthrough hit, reaching number two on the Record Retailer chart. As the song became a hit, Stevens' was booked as an opening act for larger artists, performing across the United Kingdom. This sudden; newfound fame came as a shock to Stevens, who previously had only experienced moderate success with his debut single "I Love My Dog" (1966). According to Albert Watson of The Journal, "I'm Gonna Get Me a Gun" was written as a direct response to the pressures of the pop world, as he was unable to cope with his fame. According to Stevens himself, "I'm Gonna Get Me a Gun" had its origin in one of his "main ambitions"; writing a West End musical about the life of American outlaw Billy the Kid, a concept that also spawned "Northern Wind" which was recorded for his second studio album New Masters later that year. Stevens' sat on the song's intro for six months, before he managed to write the middle eight and outro.

Not intent on wasting time following the success of "Matthew and Son", Decca Records ushered Stevens' back into Decca Studios in West Hampstead, London on 23 January 1967. As part of a marathon recording session, Stevens' taped "I'm Gonna Get Me a Gun", "When I Speak to the Flowers", "The Tramp", "Hummingbird" and "Lady" on this date. As with the rest of the material that would end up on his debut album Matthew and Son, the recordings were produced by Mike Hurst and engineered by Vic Smith. Alan Tew wrote the song's arrangement and acted as the musical director. As with "Matthew and Son", session musicians that appeared on "I'm Gonna Get Me a Gun" included Nicky Hopkins (keyboards), John Paul Jones (bass guitar) and Big Jim Sullivan (guitar).

== Composition and lyrics ==
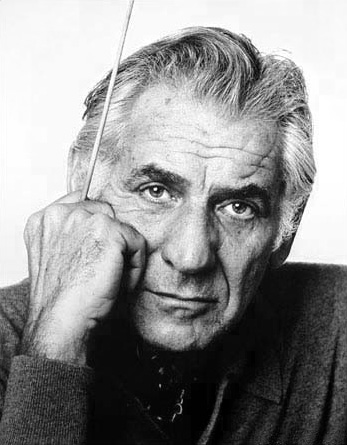
Composer Leonard Bernstein provided Stevens' with the inspiration for "I'm Gonna Get Me a Gun".

As recorded by Stevens, "I'm Gonna Get Me a Gun" has a runtime of 2:11. Musically, the song is a "thumper" which was written in the key of A major. The song's thirty-two bar form with staccato articulations present throughout the track was primarily inspired by the compositions of Leonard Bernstein, one of Stevens' earliest influences in his childhood. In 2025, Stevens admitted in his autobiography that "I'm Gonna Get Me a Gun" was "heavily Bernstein-influenced". The track is heavily orchestrated, featuring both string- and woodwind instruments including a marimba performance in the instrumental breaks following the refrains. Musicologist Andy Neill states that the arrangement is "breathtaking" to the point it "threatens to overwhelm" the song. As such, Stevens biographer Chris Charlesworth refers to the track as an "orchestral pop song with folk-pop undertones". George Brown believes the song adheres to baroque pop, whereas Far Out magazine writer Will Howard opines the song bears influences from music hall, both lyrically and musically.

The song has primarily been noted for its lyrics, which have been perceived as "aggressive". The lyrics regards a perpetrator, who has grown tired of being "demoralised too many times" to the point of a breakdown. According to Howard, the tale then takes a darker turn, with the perpetrator "getting himself a six-shooter and taking violent revenge on all the people who wronged him" without any discernable motifs or specifics. Charlesworth on the contrary believe the lyrics to be tongue-in-cheek and deliberately exaggerated. Neill indicates the lyrics to be "darkly humorous", as does AllMusic critic Bruce Eder who believes they represent" Stevens' early debt to Leonard Bernstein's West Side Story more than any predilection to violence".

== Release and commercial performance ==
"I'm Gonna Get Me a Gun" was initially released as Cat Stevens' third 7-inch single in the United Kingdom on 23 March 1967 through the Decca subsidiary Deram Records, (Note: Though Friday, 24 March 1967 is often cited as the single's release date, the release was moved ahead one day to Thursday, 23 March, as 24 March was Good Friday.) Backed by another one of Stevens' compositions, "School is Out", a similarly Bernstein-influenced song which was a leftover from the recording sessions of the "Matthew and Son" single. (Note: Catalogue number Deram DM 118.) "I'm Gonna Get a Gun" was issued as a non-album companion piece to his debut album Matthew and Son, which had been released two weeks earlier on 10 March. (Note: Catalogue number Deram DML 1004 (mono) SML 1004 (stereo).) Deram promoted the single with the help of a "series of p.r. photos featuring the artist cradling a six-shooter". Further promoting the single's release, Stevens' was booked onto a package tour together with the Walker Brothers, Engelbert Humperdinck and the Jimi Hendrix Experience starting on 31 March.

Well, I liked the controversy in the beginning, but it got to be hectic, and I don't want anybody to feel bad or brought down nor to entice kids to buy guns. In the context of the Western musical, the sound wasn't bad-I liked it, but I see now that it was my fault for not explaining the context before it was released.

— Cat Stevens (1967)

The release of "I'm Gonna Get Me a Gun" was surrounded by controversy, as then-disc jockey Jimmy Savile condemned the single upon hearing it when participating in the BBC programme Juke Box Jury, fearing it would incite violence amongst teenagers. In response to the controversy, Stevens' apologized for not clarifying the song's context prior to release in an interview with the New Musical Express. The controversy did not prevent "I'm Gonna Get Me a Gun" from becoming a hit; it entered the Record Retailer chart on 5 April 1967 at a position of 45 before peaking at number six on 3 May 1967. It remained in the top-ten for three weeks and dropped out on 7 June at a position of 42, having spent ten weeks on the charts. Elsewhere in the world, the single also became a top-ten hit in Ireland, New Zealand, and Rhodesia. It was also Stevens' first top-twenty entry in Sweden, where it peaked at number 11. Despite the apparent success, Charlesworth argued it was a relative "failure", as it failed to match the chart performance of "Matthew and Son".

"I'm Gonna Get Me a Gun" and "School is Out" were deliberately left off Matthew and Son's release in the UK to give the single some exclusivity. In the US, Deram released Matthew and Son in May 1967 with a re-shuffled track-listing. (Note: Catalogue number Deram DE 16005 (mono), DES 18005 (stereo).) On the American version of the album, "I'm Gonna Get Me a Gun" and "School is Out" replaced four album tracks; "Portobello Road", "Granny", "The Tramp" and "Come on and Dance". In the UK, both tracks were additionally passed over for inclusion on Stevens' second studio album New Masters, released in December 1967. Instead, these tracks received their first album release on the compilation album The World of Cat Stevens, which Decca compiled after Stevens' left the label. Both tracks have since been included as bonus tracks of the 1988 CD reissue of Matthew and Son, the In Search of the Centre of the Universe box set in 2001, and in 2003 both the mono- and stereo versions of both songs were included on the remaster of Matthew and Son.

== Critical reception and legacy ==
Upon release, the single received good reviews in the British music press. Although Penny Valentine of Disc and Music Echo wished Stevens' had released "Hummingbird" from the Matthew and Son album as a single, she liked "I'm Gonna Get Me a Gun" and believed it proved Stevens had a "very distinctive style and voice". She found that Hurst's production had given the song a "bouncing, bounding backing" reminiscent of The Magnificent Seven. Though she noted the lyrics as violent, the single was a "not to be faulted record". Derek Johnson of the New Musical Express similarly expressed praise for the song's arrangement, highlighting the "up-tempo pulsating rhythm, cellos, shimmering strings, blaring brass and clanking clavioline", believing they make "the disc vibrate". He also lauds Stevens' performance as being a "knockout" that is original and "totally distinctive". On the contrary, he criticizes the song's lyrics, finding it to be "a pity that someone with so much talent should find it necessary to write such a provocative lyric".

Chris Welch of Melody Maker lauded the single, considering it "undoubtedly Cat's best record to date end should chase the Manfreds [Manfred Mann] right up to the top of the chart". He singled out the arrangement as being busier and "more exciting" than "I Love My Dog", believing it was exhausting to "take it all in". Though he believed Tew's scoring to almost "drown out" Stevens' performance, he compares it to the wall of sound production method that he believes gives the record an "enormous film score" sound. He also singles out the lyrics, writing them to be "good" and "rebellious" that would appeal to "younger generations". Peter Jones of Record Mirror similarly found the single to be "his [Stevens'] best yet, directing specific praise to both Hurst and Tew's involvement and writing that the track contains "instant commercialism" and represented a "real performance job". In a blind date for Melody Maker, singer Vince Hill on the contrary found the song to be inferior to "Matthew and Son", criticizing "I'm Gonna Get Me a Gun" for not lending itself to the same style of arrangement.

According to Will Howard, the song' satire remains on the surface level, and although he felt it was "weird to accuse him [Stevens] of shallow songwriting", he was "more than guilty of it" on the single. On the contrary, Mayer Nissim of Gold Radio rated "I'm Gonna Get Me a Gun" as Stevens' eight greatest song, stating that the "music is a wonderfully punchy, brassy smack to the chops" if you can "put the lyrics to the side". In 2025, Stevens' himself reflected on the single, stating that it expressed an important desire in his life; "the yearning to escape the posse of pop-chart chasers". The song's lyrical content continued to cause controversy years after release; during the first Gulf War in 1990, "I'm Gonna Get Me a Gun" was one of 67 songs that the BBC deemed inappropriate and eventually banned altogether from radio airplay.

== Charts ==
=== Weekly charts ===
Charts (1967)	Peak position
Australia (Kent Music Report)	54
Belgium (Ultratop 50 Flanders)	15
Belgium (Ultratop 50 Wallonia)	49
Ireland (RTÉ)	9
Netherlands (Veronica Top 40)	26
Netherlands (Single Top 100)	18
New Zealand (Listener)	4
Rhodesia (Lyons Maid)	8
Sweden (Tio i Topp)	11
UK (Disc and Music Echo)	7
UK (Melody Maker)	6
UK (New Musical Express)	8
UK (Record Retailer)	6

=== Year-end charts ===
Chart (1967)	Peak position
UK (Record Retailer)	100

== Sources ==
- Brown, George (2006). The Complete Illustrated Biography & Discography. United Kingdom: Brown. OCLC 77117322.
- Charlesworth, Chris (1984). Cat Stevens: The Definitive Career Biography. United Kingdom: Proteus. ISBN 978-086-27-618-13. OCLC 471584405.
- DeYoung, Bill; Stevens, Cat (2001). Cat Stevens (Box Set). US: A&M. 981 082-1 – via MusicBrainz.
- Hallberg, Eric; Henningsson, Ulf (2012). Tio i Topp - med de utslagna "på försök" 1961–74 [Tio I Topp With The Eliminated On Try 1961–1974] (in Swedish) (2nd ed.). Stockholm: Premium. ISBN 978-91-89136-89-2. OCLC 939611828.
- Kent, David (2005). Australian Chart Book 1940–1969. Turramurra, NSW: Australian Chart Book. ISBN 0-646-44439-5. OCLC 62561852.
- Kimberley, C (2000). Zimbabwe: Singles Chart Book. Zimbabwe. OCLC 499262382.
- Kirby, Mark (2000). Sociology in Perspective. United Kingdom: Pearson Education. ISBN 978-0-435-33160-3 – via Google Books.
- Neill, Andy (2003). Matthew and Son (CD). Europe: Deram. 981 082-1.
- Stevens, Cat / Yusuf (2025). Cat On The Road To Findout: The Official Autobiography. United Kingdom: Constable. ISBN 978-1-40872-080-6. OCLC 1541792701.
- Tracy, John (1988). Matthew and Son (CD). United States: Deram. 820 560-2.
