= Matthew and Son =

- Swedish picture sleeve

Single by Cat Stevens

from the album Matthew & Son
- B-side: "Granny"
- Released: 30 December 1966
- Recorded: 1 December 1966
- Studio: Decca, London
- Genre: Baroque pop
- Length: 2:46
- Label: Deram
- Songwriter: Cat Stevens
- Producer: Mike Hurst

Cat Stevens singles chronology
"I Love My Dog" (1966)	"Matthew and Son" (1966)	"I'm Gonna Get Me a Gun" (1967)

Audio
- "Matthew and Son" on YouTube

"Matthew and Son" is a song written and released by singer-songwriter Cat Stevens in 1966. Following his discovery by producer and manager Mike Hurst, Stevens debuted professionally in the music business with the release of his single "I Love My Dog" in September 1966. The song's surprising commercial success established his idiosyncratic songwriting style and extended his contract with Deram Records. "Matthew and Son" was musically inspired by a previous song he had written, while the lyrics were inspired by his girlfriend at the time, who worked a lot. Musically, the song is a baroque pop song with both brass and string arrangements while the lyrics tells the tale of the titular company exploiting their timid workers. "Matthew and Son" was recorded on 1 December 1966 at Decca Studios in London with Hurst producing.

Deram released "Matthew and Son" as Cat Stevens's second single on 30 December 1966, with "Granny" as its B-side. Stevens was called in to perform the song at a variety of light entertainment programs in 1967, including Ready Steady Go! and Top of the Pops. "Matthew and Son" entered the Record Retailer chart in January 1967 before peaking at number two in February, becoming Stevens's highest-charting single in his home country. Elsewhere in the world, the song also charted high in both Africa and Oceania, reaching number one in New Zealand. Owing to its success, the song became the title track of Stevens's debut album in March 1967. Upon initial release the song received critical acclaim, with many critics noting the lyrics. Being one of Stevens's best known songs, it has been included on several of his compilation albums and has inspired other artists.

== Background and writing ==
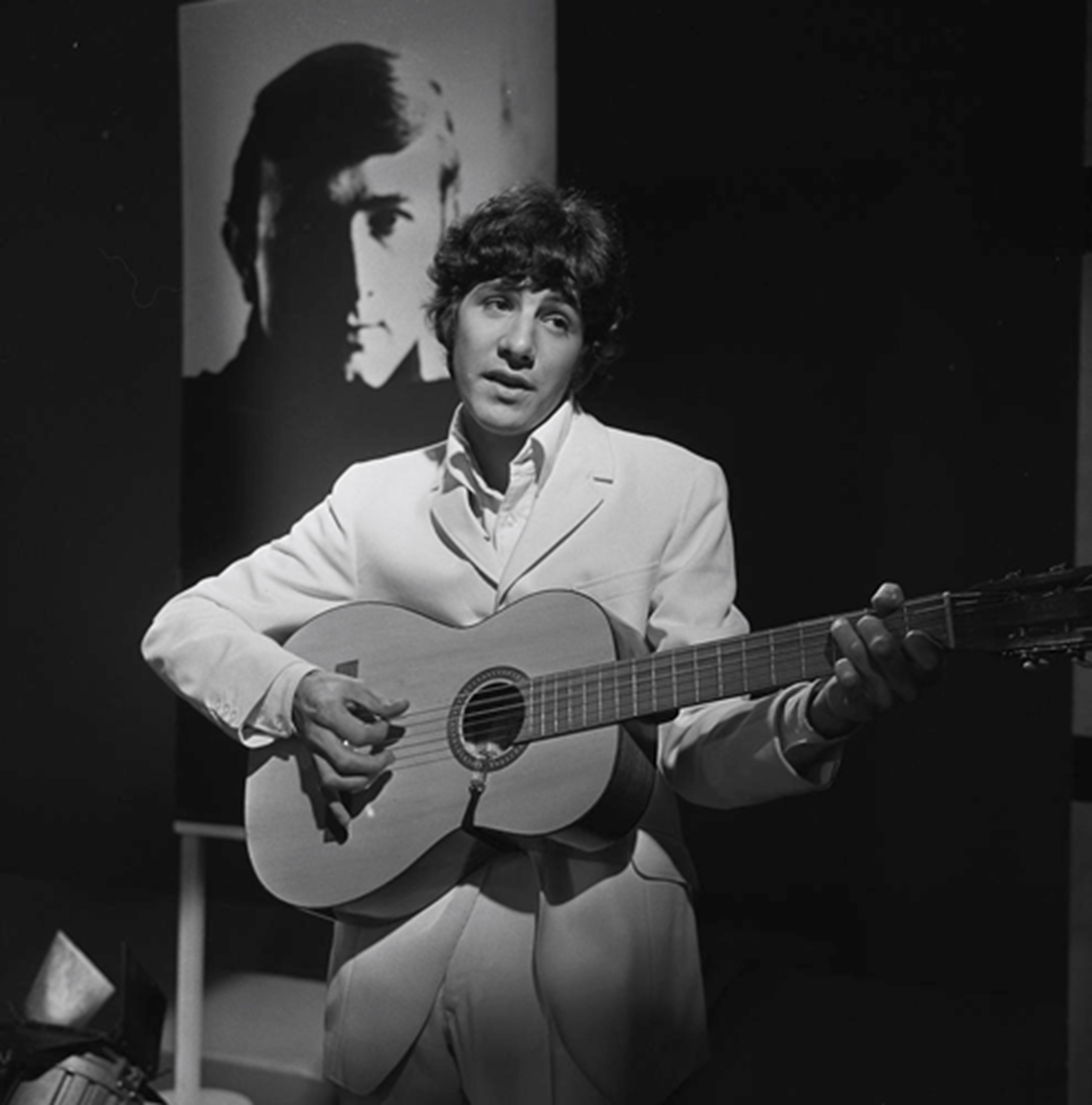
Cat Stevens in 1966, shortly after the success of "I Love My Dog"

In early 1966, a then-17-year-old Cat Stevens performed his song "I Love My Dog" for producer and manager Mike Hurst. Jim Economides, Hurst's boss, was rather dismissive of the composition, considering it "rubbish" and rejecting signing Stevens. Stevens relented, and in June 1966 he appeared at Hurst's doorstep, claiming to have been rejected by every single label in London. Hurst, who believed Stevens to be an extraordinary talent despite his young age, arranged studio time with his own funds in July 1966 in order to record Stevens's two compositions, "I Love My Dog" and "Portobello Road". (Note: "Portobello Road" was co-written by Kim Fowley.) Following this, he passed the recording around various record labels in London, hoping that one would sign Stevens.

Coincidentally, at the same time, Decca Records set up their sub-label Deram. The label was designated towards "avant-garde artists", and once Hurst got in contact with the fledgling label, he quickly managed to strike a deal for Stevens. So on 30 September 1966, Deram released "I Love My Dog" as the inaugural single on the label. (Note: Catalogue number DM 102. DM 101 belonged to a single by singer Beverley Martyn; both were released on the same day.) To the surprise of both Hurst and Stevens, "I Love My Dog" managed to chart on the UK Record Retailer chart, peaking at number 28 in November 1966. Following the single's surprise success, the head of Decca, Sir Edward Lewis, extended the contract with Hurst for Stevens to release three singles within a year on Deram.

Musically, "Matthew and Son" had been composed before Stevens's deal with Deram had taken place. The hook of the song had originally been intended as a part for a separate song that Stevens had written in 1965, "Baby Take Me Back Home". Lyrically, "Matthew and Son" had in turn been inspired by one of Stevens's girlfriends at the time, who according to him was "working for a big firm" and that he didn't like that "she had to spend so much of her time working". In a later interview, Stevens recalled that this was a form of "social commentary" about "people being slaves to other people". In a February 1967 interview with Beat Instrumental, Stevens stated his lyrics were "taken from personal experience".

The song's title has an ambiguous origin, with sources disputing where it came from. Stevens has stated that he took inspiritation from his tailor Henry Matthews, who made suits for him, and thought up the story of the worker who is the main character in the song. Journalist Chris Charlesworth also notes that Stevens may have been inspired by a company named Foster Wheeler Power Products through a sign that Stevens saw during a bus ride in London, noting that he had brainstormed the titular business before even getting off at his stop. Alternatively, Stevens has also claimed that the title was chosen simply because "the riff seemed to fit the words, 'Matthew and Son'".

== Composition and recording ==
As originally recorded by Cat Stevens, "Matthew and Son" is a baroque pop song that was written in a thirty-two-bar form, primarily utilizing the pitches found in the E major key scale. (Note: The song's thirty-two-bar form was clearly inspired by Stevens's appreciation for Tin Pan Alley music; specifically the musical West Side Story.) The song's first two verses alternate between two chords, E minor and C while the choruses revert to the chords of A and B, alternating between them every other measure. The song's middle eight has the chord of B replaced by E minor which similarly alternates with the chord of A every other measure. According to journalist Chris Charlesworth, these vastly different structures keeps a "first-time listener on the edge throughout the entire performance". Each section of the song's structure are clearly separated by various fills that all utilize various instruments; the first three are performed primarily on brass instrument while a fourth one largely revolves around a piano being played. (Note: The piano heard on the song has often been confused with a harpsichord.)

"Matthew And Son" was one of those titles that I had to use. When I thought of it I automatically wrote a tune into It. I wanted listeners to hear the tune when they heard the title.

— Cat Stevens, Melody Maker (1967)

Lyrically, "Matthew and Son" acts as a criticism of employers of the working class. The titular "Matthew and Son" aren't characters but a business that provide their employees with a substandard work environment. The workers receive few breaks in their routine, and their food is generally poor. Workers there, some of whom have fifty years of experience with the business, are wage slaves. Because all of them are too apathetic and timid to do so, none of them dare ask for raises or promotions to higher-paying work, despite a commonality of financial hardship. Journalist Andy Neill compares the lyrical content to that of the Easybeats contemporary hit single "Friday on My Mind" (1966), noting their similar statuses as odes to the working class.

"Matthew and Son" was initially recorded as a barebones demo featuring Stevens only accompanied by his guitar before Hurst brought this acetate recording to Decca's head promoter Tony Hall, who dismissed the song. (Note: Since its recording, the demo has been lost.) Without involvement of Decca executives, Hurst booked studio time at Decca Studios in London on 1 December 1966 with his own funds specifically to record the song. "Matthew and Son" was recorded in roughly six or seven takes, with the session also yielding two other songs; "Granny" and "School is Out", the latter of which would become the B-side of his follow-up single "I'm Gonna Get Me a Gun". Hurst estimated that roughly 25 session musicians were present in the studio for the session, primarily consisting of brass and string performers. A harp player was also hired. Named session musicians include Andy White (drums), Nicky Hopkins (piano), John Paul Jones (bass guitar) and Big Jim Sullivan (guitar). Hurst produced the sessions, with Vic Smith engineering and Alan Tew as the musical director.

== Release and commercial performance ==
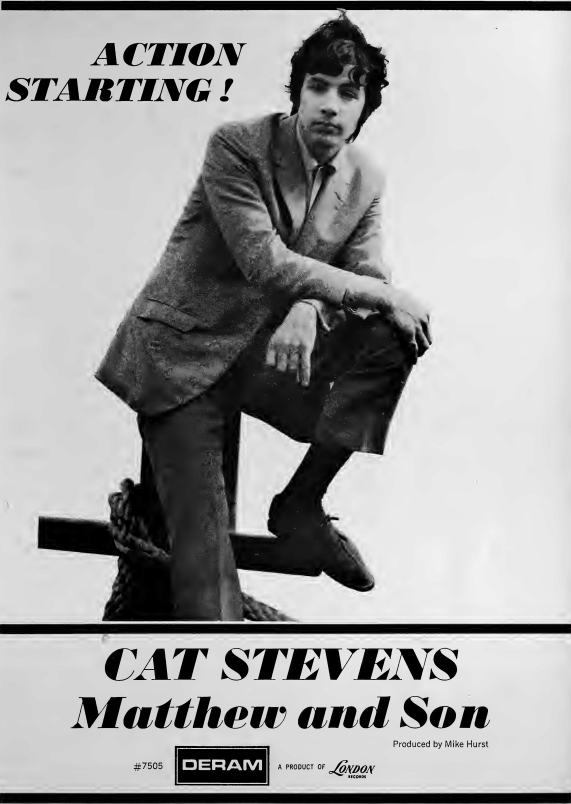
Cash Box trade ad for the single

After recording, Hurst brought the tapes of "Matthew and Son" back to Tony Hall, who still remained dismissive of it. Allan Keen, a disc jockey on pirate radio station Radio London was instrumental in the song's success, with Hurst bringing a copy of the song to him. Though Keen did not like the song either, he agreed to play it on his show to "see if it would catch on". Proving to be a popular song, Deram released "Matthew and Son" as Stevens's second single on 30 December 1966, with another of Stevens's compositions, "Granny", on the B-side. (Note: Catalogue number DM 110.) To promote the single, Stevens was in January 1967 called onto various light entertainment television shows, including Ready Steady Go! and Top of the Pops. According to Hurst, when recording a radio session for the BBC Light Programme, Hall came rushing into the recording studio to "tell them [Hurst and Stevens] that 'Matthew and Son' had sold 30,000 copies in one day".

"Matthew and Son" entered the UK's Record Retailer chart on 18 January 1967 at a position of number 33 before peaking at number two on 8 February, a position it held for two consecutive weeks. It was only held off the top spot by the Monkees' "I'm a Believer" and exited the chart on 22 March 1967, having spent ten weeks in the charts. With the Tremeloes cover of "Here Comes My Baby" at number ten on 22 February 1967, Stevens's had two of his compositions in the Record Retailer top ten at the same time. "Matthew and Son" shared a peak of number two in the UK's other major record charts, while significant pirate radio play helped it reach number-one on Radio London's Fab 40 chart. In Ireland, the song peaked at number three in February 1967. To date, it remains Cat Stevens's highest-charting single in the British Isles.

Elsewhere in Continental Europe, "Matthew and Son" also saw some chart success, which was primarily fueled by Cat Stevens's tour to West Germany in the early months of 1967. There, it peaked at number 25. Charlesworth believes that the song's commercial performance in mainland Europe was generally lackluster compared to the UK; the only country "Matthew and Son" reached the top-ten in Europe outside of the British Isles was Belgium, where it reached number seven in April 1967. Despite not touring in either territory at the time, the single saw its greatest mainstream success in Africa and Oceania; in New Zealand it reached number one on the charts while peaking at number two and three in South Africa and Rhodesia, respectively. Although Deram tried marketing the song for the US market, "Matthew and Son" only managed to reach the Billboard Bubbling Under Hot 100, though it did chart in both the Cash Box and Record World top-100, peaking at number 92 on both charts.

With "Matthew and Son" becoming a success, Deram demanded a studio album from Stevens, which would be released on 10 March 1967 as Matthew & Son with the title track acting as the opening track. (Note: Catalogue number DML 1004 (mono) and SML 1004 (stereo).) The B-side "Granny" was also included on the album, while both sides of Stevens's debut single "I Love My Dog" were also included. According to Charlesworth, the inclusion of both singles "made the album a steady seller", with it peaking at number seven on Record Retailer's album chart. (Note: It was Stevens's highest charting studio album until Teaser and the Firecat in 1971.) Being one of Stevens's highest-charting singles, "Matthew and Son" has also been included on several of his compilation albums, including The Very Best of Cat Stevens (2000), Gold (2005), along with the box set Cat Stevens – In Search of the Centre of the Universe (2001).

== Critical reception and legacy ==
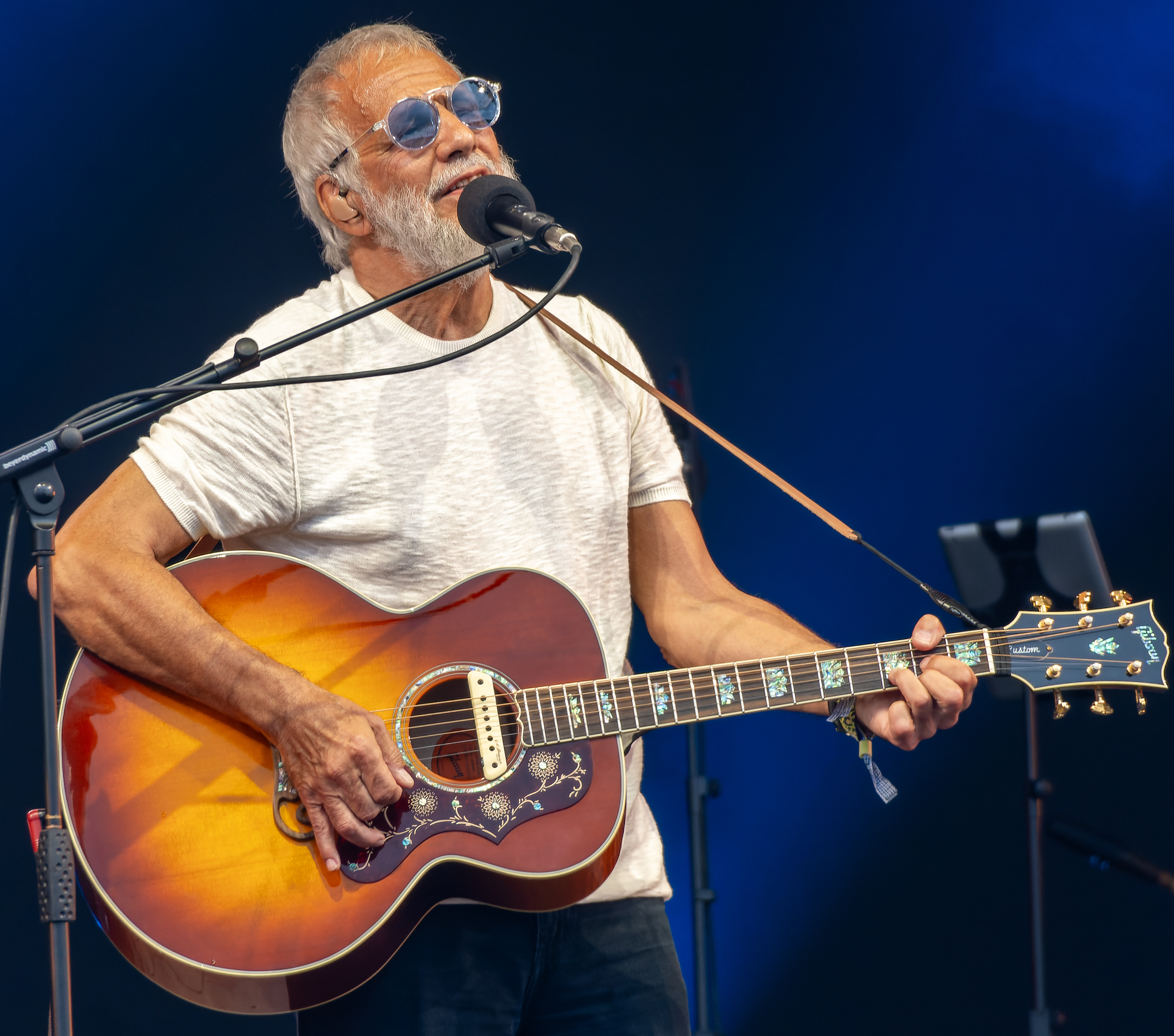
Stevens at the 2023 Glastonbury Festival. He performed "Matthew and Son" in his set there.

Upon release in 1966, "Matthew and Son" received praise from critics, who primarily noted the song's lyrical direction. Writing for Disc and Music Echo, journalist Penny Valentine believed that Cat Stevens would become "Britain's up-and-coming songwriter" because of the release. She noted the song's homage to the working class, comparing it to the lyrics of "Something's Coming", a song from the musical West Side Story from which Stevens took inspiration, and similarly compared the song with the works of Leonard Bernstein which she finds "strong". She concluded by calling it "an excellent record". In a blind date for Melody Maker, Julie Felix and Georgie Fame considered the song "great". Fame stated that the record was a "strong double-sider", noting the B-side "Granny" to be as good, and suggested that Stevens "surprised" and made him "completely knocked out". In Cash Box, the staff reviewer noted the lyrics, considering it to be a "precise, biting social commentary effort", while also praising the B-side.

Retrospectively, "Matthew and Son" has also received praise from critics, with Bruce Eder of AllMusic stating that song's "tinkling harpsichords" was "a beautiful, candid audio "snapshot" of one side of Swinging London's musical ambience in late 1966 and early 1967". Andy Neill similarly believes that the song and its accompanying album were a testament to both Stevens's idiosyncratic songwriting style and Hurst's ability to "conjure suitably imaginative arrangements". He also writes that the song's lyrical topic was ahead of its time, since pop songs of the era had a tendency to ignore hardships of workers. Because of the single's success, Stevens became part of a package tour together with Jimi Hendrix, the Walker Brothers and Engelbert Humperdinck which according to John Tracy cemented the "healthy reputation his platters had already started to create". "Matthew and Son" is among the few songs from early in his career that Stevens still performs; it was notably performed in a surprise performance at the Glastonbury Festival in 2023.

Since its original release, Cat Stevens has also referred to "Matthew and Son" in his other musical work, including a small four-note riff from the song in "(I Never Wanted) To Be a Star" from his album Izitso (1977). "Matthew and Son" has also influenced songs by other artists; British rock band Echo & the Bunnymen would borrow the song's bridge melody for their 1983 single "The Cutter", which reached number eight in the UK. Charlesworth also suggests that the song inspired the melody for British pop group Tears for Fears 1982 single "Mad World", which would become a worldwide hit that year. Stevens himself has acknowledged this influence from the song, and has referenced this during performances, most notably during his 2016 tour and his surprise appearance at the 2023 Glastonbury Festival. The song appears on the soundtrack of Michael Apted's Stardust (1974); its appearance in the movie is an anachronism, since it was set in 1965.

== Personnel ==
- Cat Stevens – guitar, vocals
- Big Jim Sullivan – guitar
- John Paul Jones – bass guitar
- Andy White – drums, percussion
- Nicky Hopkins – keyboards
- Mike Hurst – producer
- Vic Smith – engineer
- Alan Tew – orchestral arrangements

== Charts ==
=== Weekly charts ===
Chart (1967)	Peak position
Australia (Go-Set)	17
Australia (Kent Music Report)	11
Belgium (Ultratop 50 Flanders)	15
Belgium (Ultratop 50 Wallonia)	7
Canada Top 100 (RPM)	84
France (SNEP)	35
Germany (GfK)	25
Ireland (IRMA)	3
Netherlands (Dutch Top 40)	21
New Zealand (Listener)	1
Rhodesia (Lyons Maid)	3
Singapore (Radio Singapore)	5
South Africa (Springbok Radio)	2
Spain (Promusicae)	20
UK (Disc and Music Echo)	2
UK (Melody Maker)	2
UK (New Musical Express)	2
UK (Record Retailer)	2
US Billboard Bubbling Under Hot 100	115
US Cash Box Top 100	92
US Record World 100 Top Pops	92

=== Year-end charts ===
Chart (1967)	Position
UK (Record Retailer)	34
