= Portobello Road =

Street in the Notting Hill district of west London

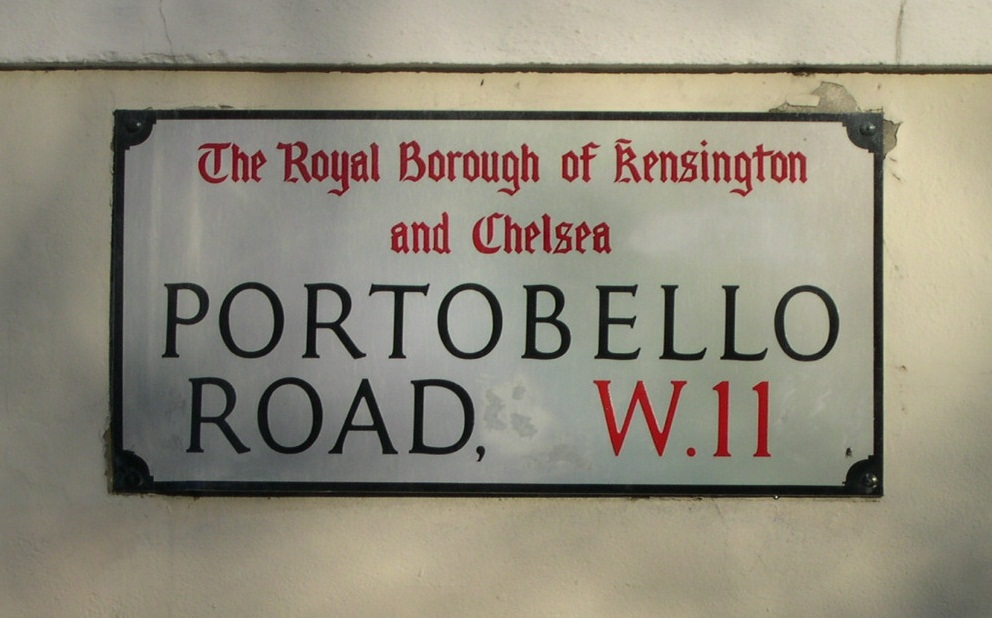
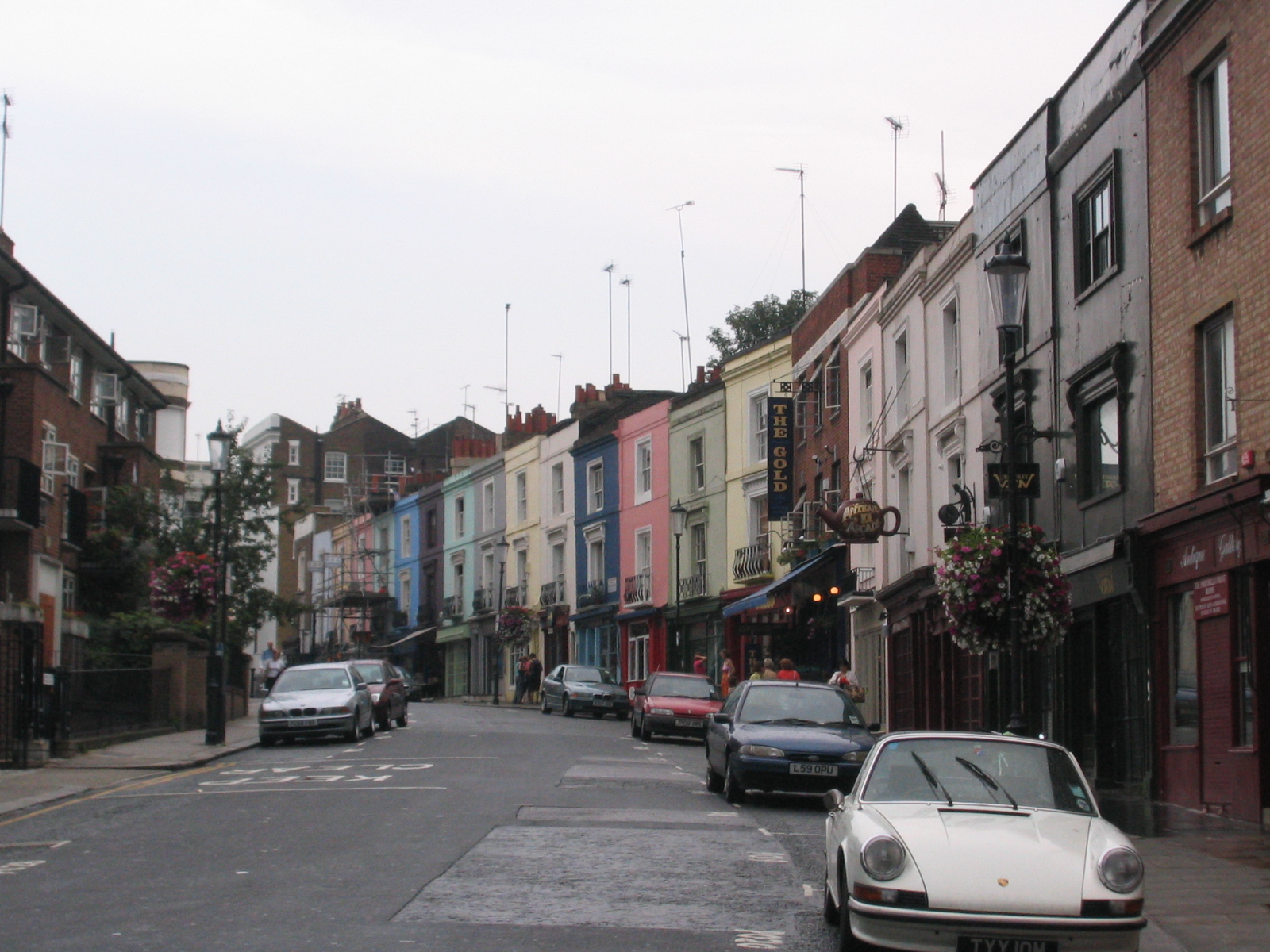
- Portobello Road street sign A view along Portobello Road

- Location within Royal Borough of Kensington and Chelsea
- Owner: Kensington and Chelsea London Borough Council
- Maintained by: Kensington and Chelsea London Borough Council
- Length: 1.72 kilometres (1.07 mi)
- Location: Notting Hill, London W10 United Kingdom
- Postal code: W10
- Coordinates: 51.51618°N 0.20517°W
- North: Murchison Gardens
- South: Pembridge Road

Other
- Known for: Notting Hill Carnival, street market, Portobello Film Festival, antiques

Portobello Road is a street in the Notting Hill district of the Royal Borough of Kensington and Chelsea in West London. It runs almost the length of Notting Hill from South to North, roughly parallel with Ladbroke Grove. On Saturdays it is home to Portobello Road Market, one of London's notable street markets, known for its second-hand clothes, pastries and antiques. Every August since 1996, the Portobello Film Festival has been held in locations around Portobello Road and, in 2015, Portobello Radio was founded as the area's community radio station.

== History ==
=== Origins ===
Portobello Road was known prior to 1740 as Green's Lane – a winding country path leading from Kensington Gravel Pits, in what is now Notting Hill Gate, up to Kensal Green in the north. It descends from 84 feet (25.6 m) above sea level at the northern end, the highest point, to a lowest point of 65 feet (19.8 m) after which the road rises and falls before reaching a high point of 78 feet (23.8 m) at the southern end. The average grade of ascent or descent between the northern end and the lowest point is about 1.77 percent.

=== 18th century ===
In 1740, Portobello Farm was built in the area near what is now Golborne Road. The farm got its name from the 1739 Battle of Porto Bello during the lost War of Jenkins' Ear, when Admiral Edward Vernon captured the Spanish-ruled town of Puerto Bello (now known as Portobelo in modern-day Panama). Vernon Yard, which runs off Portobello Road, still honours the Admiral's name to this day. The Portobello farming area covered the land which is now St Charles' Hospital.

=== Urbanisation ===
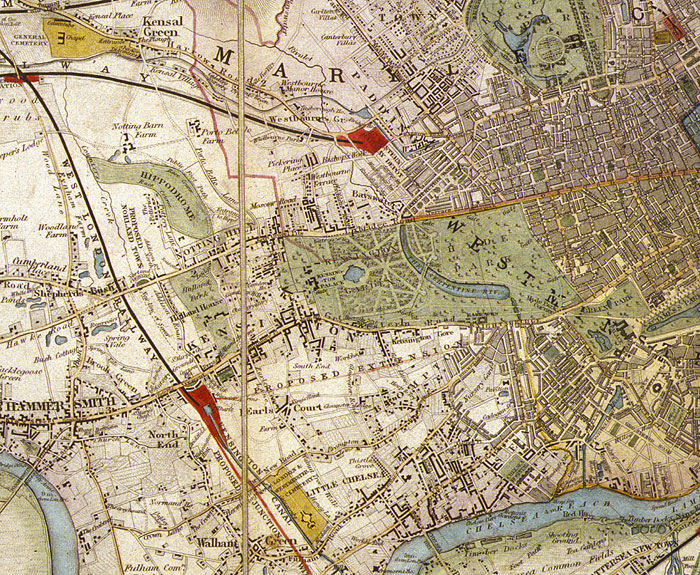
1841 map of the Environs of London, showing the Portobello Farm on the upper left-hand side, and Porto Bello Lane.

Portobello Road became an urban highway in the Victorian era. Before about 1850, it was little more than a country lane connecting Portobello Farm with Kensal Green in the north and what is today Notting Hill in the south. Much of it consisted of hayfields, orchards and other open land. The road ultimately took form piecemeal in the second half of the 19th century, nestling between the large new residential developments of Paddington and Notting Hill. Its shops and markets thrived on serving the wealthy inhabitants of the elegant crescents and terraces that sprang up around it, and its working-class residents found employment in the immediate vicinity as construction workers, domestic servants, coachmen, messengers, tradesmen and costermongers. After the Hammersmith and City Railway line was completed in 1864, and Ladbroke Grove station opened, the northern end of Portobello Road was also developed, and the last of the open fields disappeared under brick and concrete.

Portobello Farm was sold to an order of nuns after the railways came in 1864. They built St Joseph's Convent for the Dominican Order - or the "Black Friars" as they were known in England.

A range of communities inhabit Portobello. Its architecture is characterised by meandering roads and curving streets, in contrast to the more formally planned layout of most of the nearby area. Mid- to late-Victorian terrace houses and shops predominate, squeezed tightly into the available space. The Friends of Portobello campaign seeks to preserve the street's unique dynamic, and campaigns against branded chain stores. Portobello Road is also home to the Grade II* Electric Cinema, one of Britain's oldest cinemas.

Portobello Road is often cited in urban studies as an example of "commercial gentrification", where rising property values and tourism pressure have gradually displaced traditional local vendors in favour of more profitable businesses and chain retail.

== Portobello Road Market ==
Portobello Road Market
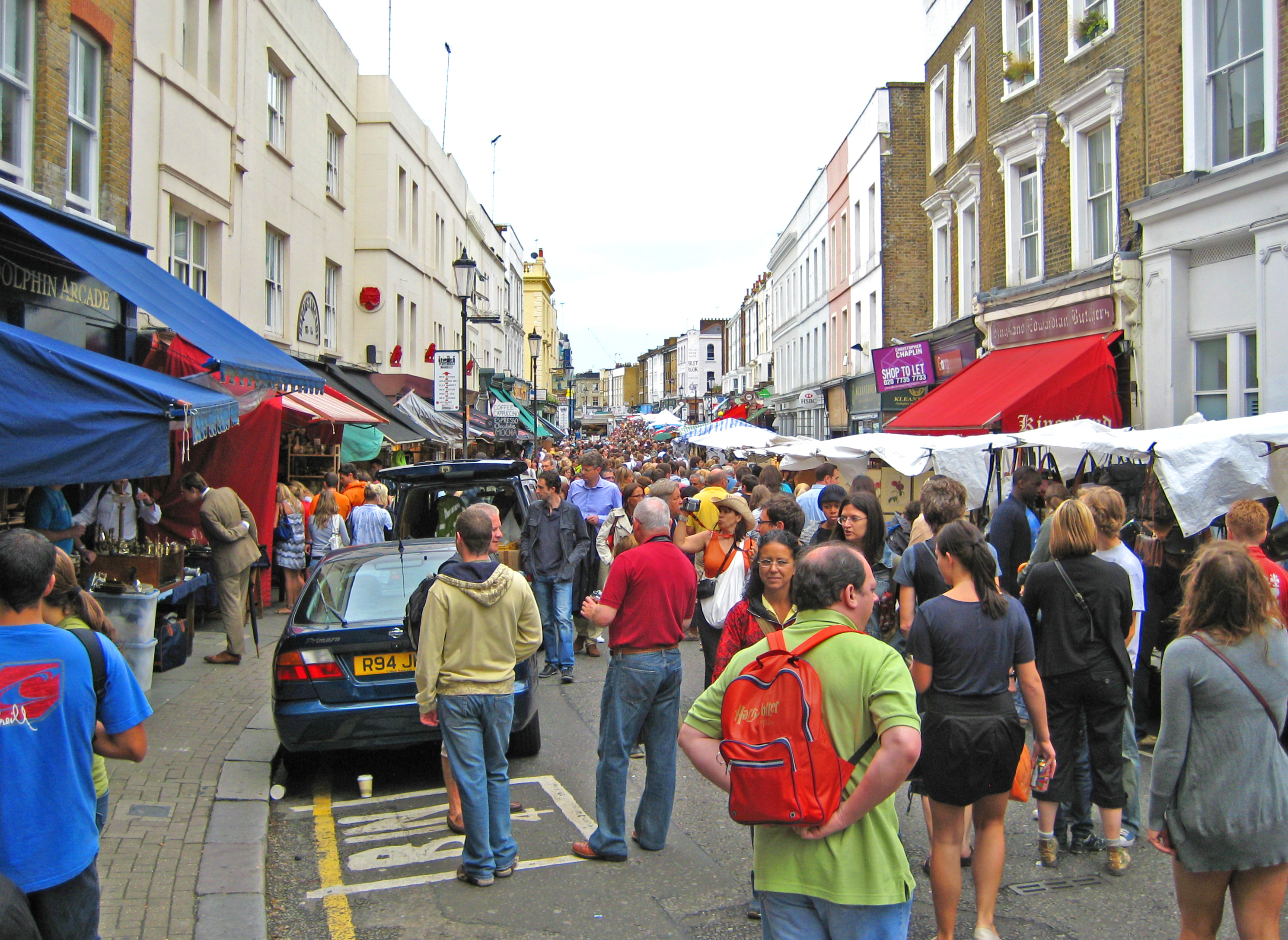
- A view north along Portobello Road from the junction with Lonsdale Road
- Opening date: c. 1863
- Management: Kensington and Chelsea London Borough Council
- Owner: Kensington and Chelsea London Borough Council
- Environment: Outdoor
- Goods sold: street food, produce, fashion, antiques
- Days normally open: Sunday, Saturday
- Parking: 240 (pitches)
- Website: Kensington and Chelsea London Borough Council's market pages
- Interactive map of Portobello Road Market

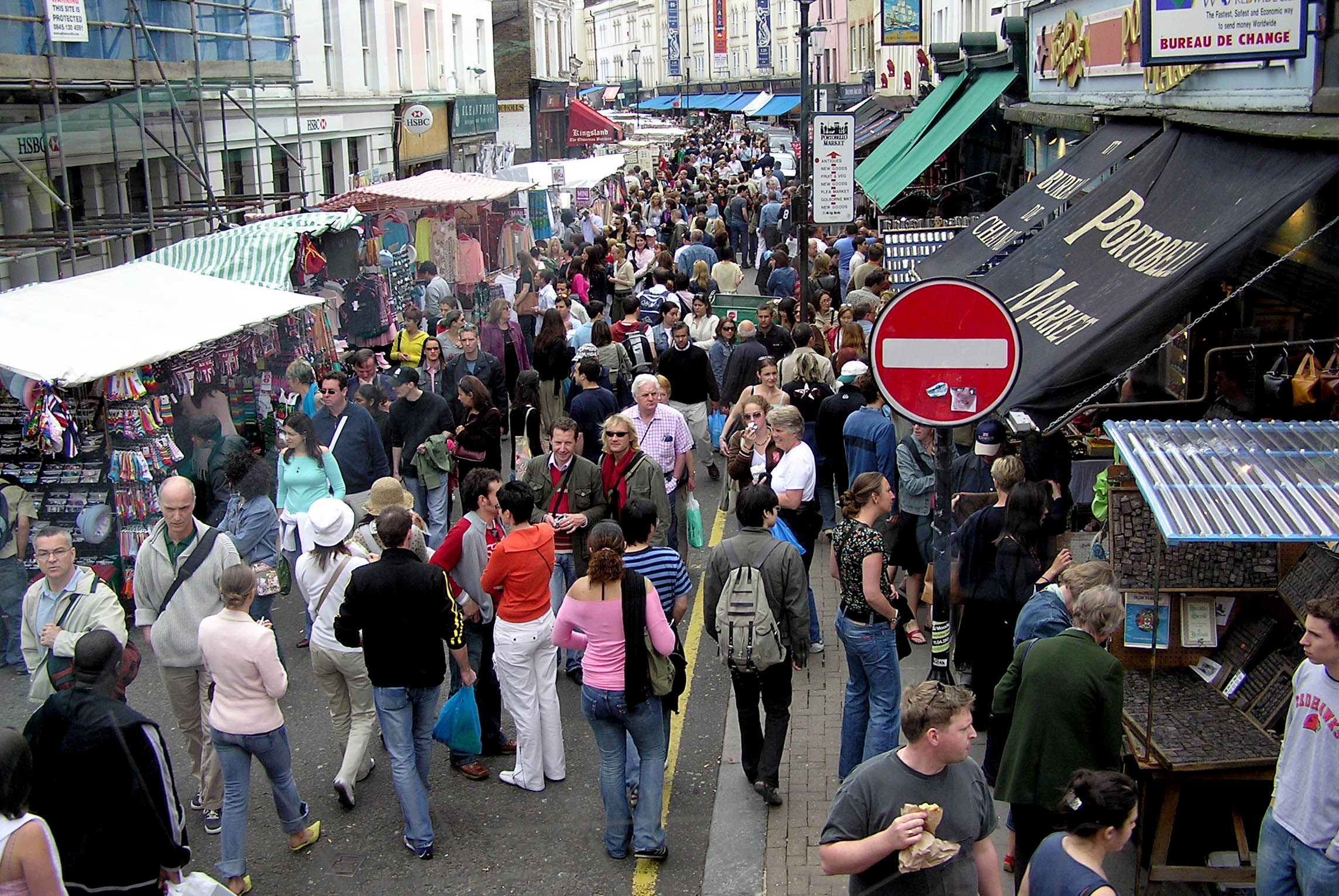
Portobello Road Market, June 2005.

Portobello Road Market draws thousands of tourists each year. The main market day for antiques is Saturday, the only day when all five sections are opened: second-hand goods, clothing and fashion, household essentials, fruit, vegetables and other food, and antiques. However, there are also clothing, antique, bric-a-brac, fruit and vegetable stalls throughout the week and are located further north than the antiques, near the Westway Flyover. Shops and cafes are opened daily.

The market began as many other London markets and mainly sold fresh-food in the 19th century; antiques and wares dealers arrived in the late 1940s and '50s, and gradually antiques have become the main attraction of this market, having a substantial number of them trading mainly on Saturday mornings. It is the largest antiques market in the UK.

The market section of Portobello Road runs in a direction generally between the north-northwest and the south-south-east. The northern terminus is at Golborne Road; the southern end is at Westbourne Grove, to the east. The market area is about 1,028 yards (940 m) long.

About one third of the way from its north end, the market runs beneath adjacent bridges of the A40 road and the Hammersmith & City line of the London Underground. Here the market focuses on second hand clothes as well as couture.

== In media ==
=== Films ===
The market was the setting for the 1999 film Notting Hill, with much of the filming taking place on the street. The blue door from the film Notting Hill sold at auction, at Christie's in 1999 for £5,750; the proceeds went to charity. A replica door was then installed and continues to be a tourist attraction.

The 1950 Ealing Studios police thriller The Blue Lamp, starring Dirk Bogarde and Jack Warner, as P.C. George Dixon, a character later revived in the long-running TV drama, Dixon of Dock Green, featured location filming in the Paddington/Notting Hill/Portobello area. It features good shots of these locations in pre-Westway days, and it includes a thrilling car chase along largely traffic-free roads, including Portobello Road.

The market was featured in the 1971 musical film Bedknobs and Broomsticks in a scene involving a song ("Portobello Road") and dance in and around the market staged on sets built at Disney's Burbank Studios. The lyrics refer to the market and the people who live and work there.

In 2006, the 20-minute documentary Portobello: Attack of the Clones won London awards and was screened a number of times at the infamous Electric Cinema. The film showed how Portobello Road is threatened by high-street stores changing the street's independent spirit. It featured a large number of local stallholders and influencers, and it was made by local filmmakers Paul McCrudden and Alex Thomas for TAG Films.

Alice's Antiques shop at the southern end of Portobello Road is also famous as being the location of Gruber's Antiques in the Paddington films.

=== Theatre ===
The 1959 British musical Make Me an Offer, with book by Wolf Mankowitz based on his novel of the same title, and music and lyrics by David Heneker and Monty Norman, takes place on Portobello Road, and includes the song "Portobello Road", sung by the ensemble. Another song, "I Want a Lock-up", also refers to Portobello Road. The musical is available for licensing through Samuel French, Inc.

=== Literature ===
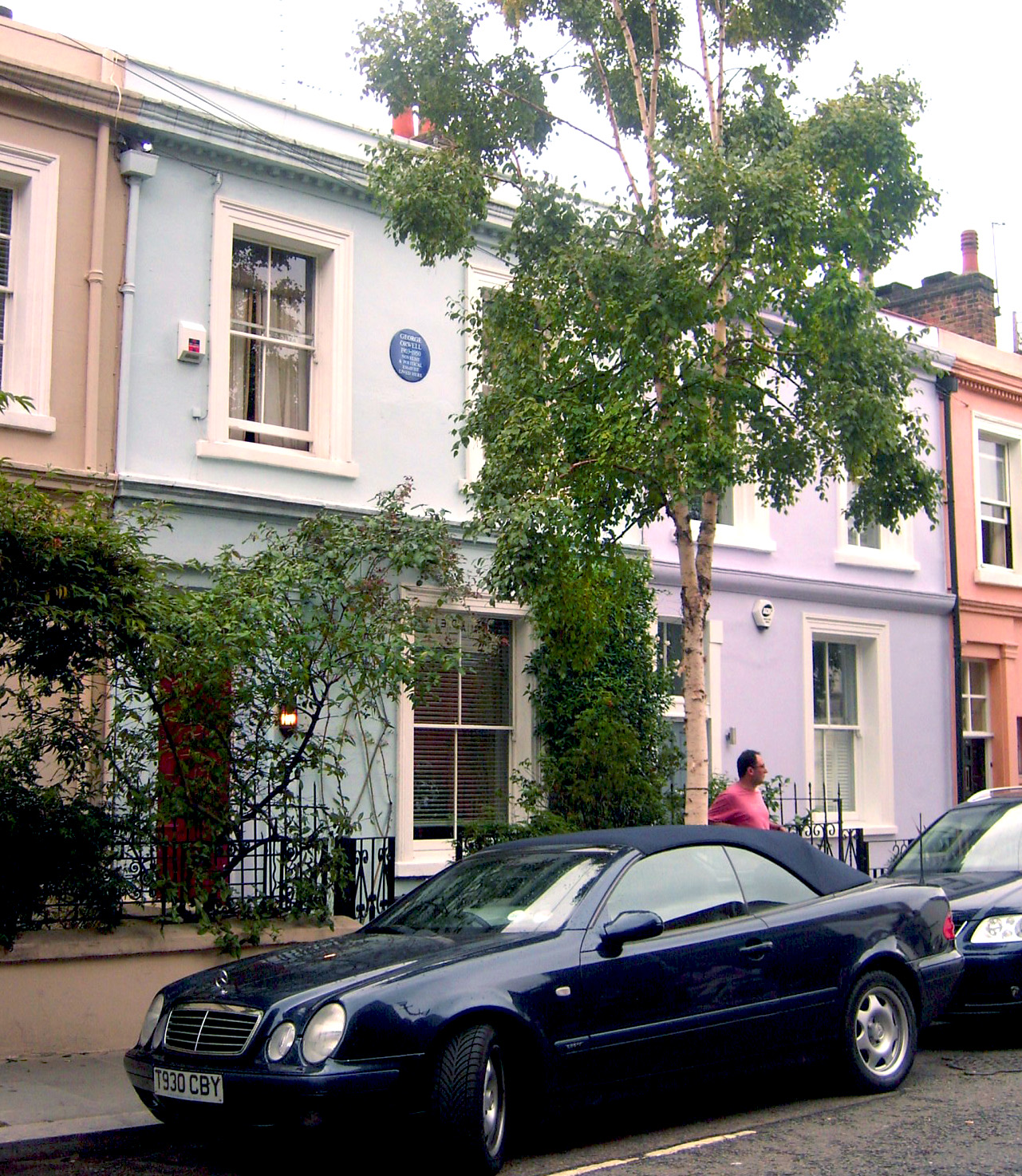
George Orwell's 1927 lodgings in Portobello Road

The Portobello Road features prominently in Martin Amis's 1989 satirical novel London Fields.

In the short story "The Portobello Road", Muriel Spark narrates the story of a murderer who, visited by the ghost of his victim, Macbeth-style, tends to constantly go to the Portobello Road market to meet her. "The Portobello Road" was included in the 1958 collection The Go-away Bird and Other Stories.

The cult British children's book character Paddington Bear, featured in the books written by Michael Bond, enjoys visiting Portobello Market on a daily basis. His friend Mr. Gruber, with whom Paddington has his elevenses every day, owns an antique shop on the Portobello Road.

In Cathy Hopkins' Mates, Dates and Portobello Princess, the fourth book of her young adult Mates, Dates series, Nesta Williams who is from a middle-class North London family struggles to fit in as she starts dating rich Simon Peddington-Lee.

In 2008, Ruth Rendell published a novel set in the area, entitled Portobello.

It is the setting for Paulo Coelho's 2007 novel, The Witch of Portobello.

In the 1970 novel The Chinese Agent by Michael Moorcock, a world-renowned jewel-thief more than meets his match when he attempts to swipe a brooch from a Portobello Road market stall, and is hunted down through the streets like a dog by the sharp-eyed market traders.

Portobello Road is also mentioned in Indian Urdu writer Shamsur Rahman Faruqi's 2006 novel The Mirror of Beauty.

In the short story "Different Skies" by China Miéville, the protagonist buys an eerie coloured window pane in Portobello Road Market. This story is included in the 2005 collection Looking for Jake.

=== Music ===
In 1979, the rock band Dire Straits sang about the road in the song "Portobello Belle" on their second album Communiqué.

In the narrative introduction to their song Have Some Madeira M'Dear, Michael Flanders of Flanders & Swann mentions a decanter he owns – "cut glass, from the Portobello Road" – in which he keeps Madeira. That decanter plus his Edwardian hat, are credited as the inspirations for the song (album: At the Drop of a Hat).

Donovan's song "Sunny South Kensington" containing the lyrics: "...in the Portobella I met a fella with a cane umbrella."

The B-side of Cat Stevens' 1966 single "I Love My Dog" is titled "Portobello Road" and discusses a walk through the famous street and market. The track also appears on Cat Stevens' 1967 debut album Matthew and Son.

It is also referenced in the song "Blue Jeans" by alternative rock band Blur, from the 1993 album Modern Life Is Rubbish, in which the opening lyrics are: "Air cushioned soles, I bought them on the Portobello Road on a Saturday."

In Caetano Veloso's "Nine Out Of Ten" song from the 1972 album Transa, he sings "walk down Portobello Road to the sound of reggae". The Brazilian artist lived in London in the late 1960s and early 1970s during his exile.

David Gilmour's song "Sing" on his 2024 Luck & Strange album contains the lyric: "Found a lifetime ago, Down the Portobello Road, Lovers' snapshots of delight, Those rosy days of black and white.".

=== TV ===
Steptoe and Son, a UK TV sitcom about Rag and Bone men, frequently refers to the road.

In the Only Fools and Horses episode "Cash and Curry", conmen use a statue of Kubera they bought from Portobello Road to deceive Del Boy and Rodney Trotter. The episode's writer, John Sullivan, had the idea after visiting the street.

The street and its name also appeared regularly on the hit TV series Minder.

BBC One's daytime antiques-based gameshow Bargain Hunt regularly features contestants buying items at the market to sell later at auction.

The 1977 to 1983 Italian television broadcast RAI was named Portobello after Portobello Road.

== See also ==
- Camden Market
- History of marketing
- Markets in London
- Market (place)
- Market town
- Museum of Brands, Packaging and Advertising
