= Jeanne Baird =

American actress (1927–2020)

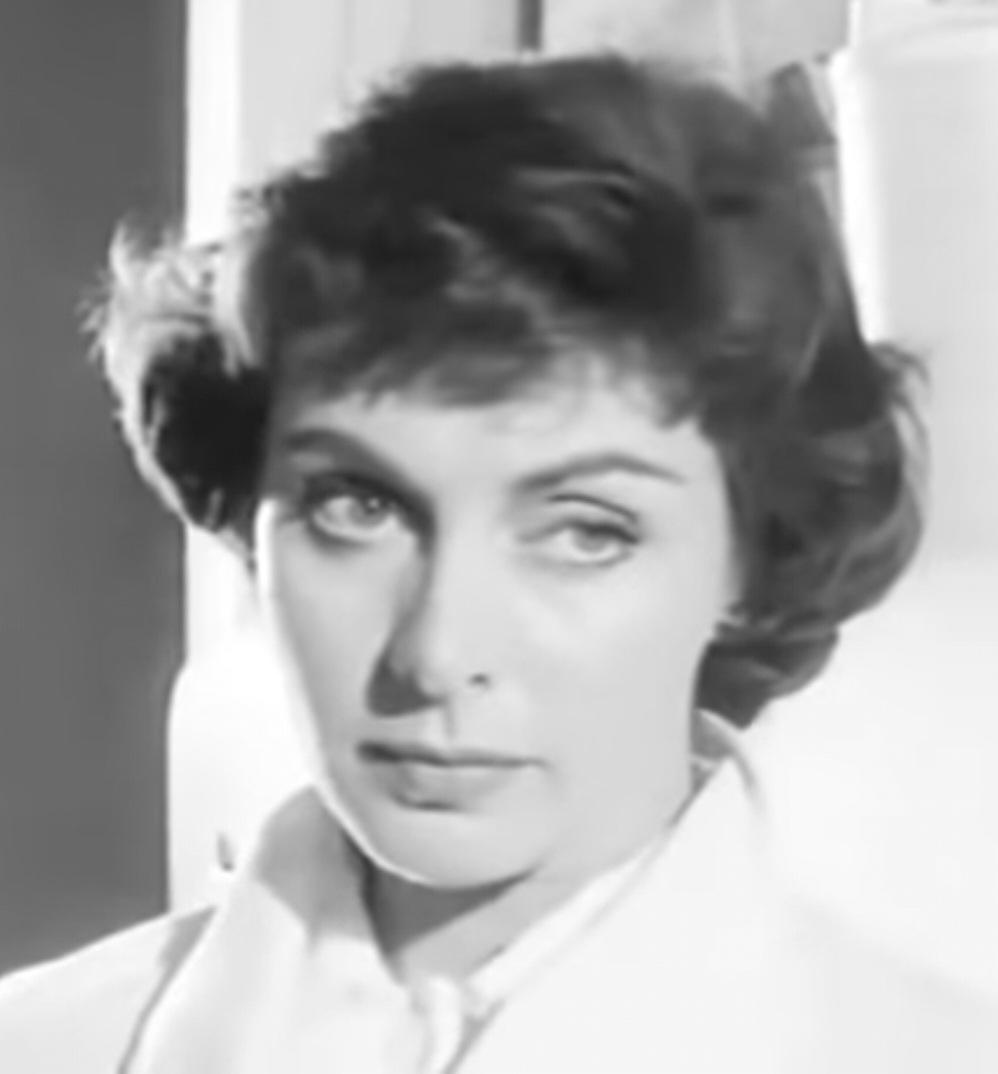
- Baird in Get Outta Town (1960)
- Born: March 28, 1927; Meadville, Pennsylvania, U.S.
- Died: August 31, 2020 (aged 93); Los Angeles, California, U.S.
- Occupation: Actress
- Years active: 1951–1995
- Spouse: William J. Meyerink (m. 1957; div. 1962)
- Children: Victoria Paige Meyerink

Jeanne Doris Baird (March 28, 1927 – August 31, 2020) was an American actress. During her career, her name was often confused with that of singer Eugenie Baird.

== Early years ==
Jeanne Doris Baird was born in Meadville, Pennsylvania on March 28, 1927, and raised and educated in Santa Barbara, California. She attended the University of California, Los Angeles (UCLA). As a teenager, Baird won the Miss Junior America beauty contest, after which she worked briefly as a model. She also painted scenery at the Lobero Theatre in Santa Barbara before she became an actress.

== Career ==
Baird gained early television experience as the "bat girl" on Batter Up! on KTTV in Los Angeles. The program was a quiz show that used a baseball format with scores based on correct answers to questions by members of two teams. She also worked at KEYT-TV in Santa Barbara in the early 1950s. Her activities there included hosting Jeanne Baird Presents, a daily afternoon program. In 1955 she went to Hollywood with plans to become an actress. She considered changing her name but decided not do so after she consulted numerologists and nomenclaturologists.

Initially Baird found herself in "character ingenue" roles, but she wondered, "How many parts are there for a character ingenue?" Eventually she moved into tragic roles, which did not suit her happier personality. Moving to New York and work on television provided opportunities for her to do "light, fun roles" and to appear on panel shows, giving people the chance to know her apart from characters that she portrayed.

While Baird was living in California, a 3000-mile trip to New York for a planned one-day filming of a commercial led to more work than she anticipated. When she finished making the commercial, she was hired to be the "Girl of the Week" for the Today show, a stint that was intended to be for one week but lasted four months. Her role on Today, in turn, led to her being selected for the cast of the NBC soap opera Ben Jerrod, playing Agnes Abbott. Other TV shows on which she appeared included Ironside, Rescue 8, Pantomime Quiz, Ben Casey, Bonanza, Four Star Playhouse, and Perry Mason.

Films in which Baird appeared included Get Outta Town, The Gay Deceivers, Black Spurs, and Andy Hardy Comes Home. She also acted in TV commercials for "everything from dog food to lavender hair rinse", and for two years she was a commentator on the NBC-TV broadcast of the Tournament of Roses Parade.

== Personal life ==
After Baird moved to Hollywood, she lived on $127.50 per month, saving the other half of each paycheck. Her apartment (a converted porch) was "the size of a streetcar".

In October 1957, Baird married lemon rancher and restaurant builder William Meyerink. They separated in 1962. Their daughter is Victoria Meyerink, who was a child actress. Mother and daughter appeared together in 1964 in "The Good Provider", an episode of The Littlest Hobo on Canada's CTV Television Network.

Jeanne Baird died in Los Angeles on August 31, 2020, at the age of 93. She was predeceased by her former husband, William, and survived by her daughter, Victoria.

== Enternal links ==
- Jeanne Baird at IMDb
