= Get Outta Town (film) =

- Written by: Charles Davis
- Screenplay by: Bob Wehling
- Starring: Doug Wilson; Jeanne Baird; Marilyn O'Connor
- Release date: 1960
- Running time: 62 min
- Language: English

Get Outta Town is a 1960 American film directed by Charles Davis, written by Bob Wehling, and starring Doug Wilson, Jeanne Baird, and Marilyn O'Connor.

== Cast ==
- Doug Wilson as Kelly Olesen
- Jeanne Baird as Jill
- Marilyn O'Connor as Claire
- Tony Louis as Rico
- Frank Harding as Sgt. Wills
- Steve Bradley as Officer Kemper
- Beppie De Vries as Mrs. Olesen
- Tommy Holden as Squirrel
- Lee Kross as Tony
- Pete Lopez as Cisco
- Gene Terry as Alex
- Sam Chiodo as Rocky

== Production ==
The film was made entirely on location around Los Angeles.

== Reception ==
Geoffrey Warren wrote in the Los Angeles Times that the film was modest but rather interesting, that the story and dialogue were thin and the cast was very weak, but was directed and photographed with care and talent.

Boxoffice wrote that the film was strictly program-filler in the pattern of innumerable current and past TV thrillers, and a dull cops-and-robbers routine. They wrote "This is for the situation where the first consideration of the customers is action and plenty of intrigue with cops and robbers and low-down characters."

The Hollywood Reporter wrote that the fact that the film was shot on local locations made it gain authenticity and that it was the film's greatest asset.

In a 2012 retrospective review, Jim Dawson wrote that it was a "better-than-average low-budget black and white film", and that "more than most Hollywood noirs of the forties and fifties [it had] the gritty feel of a pulp magazine short story, with hard characters and workingclass dialogue." He appreciated that a large portion was filmed inside the Dome Hotel Apartments at Second and Grand.

In a 2013 retrospective review, John Grant wrote that it was an indie movie from before the term was invented, and that it was a fine example of what could be done on a low budget.
