= Victoria Paige Meyerink =

American actress

- Occupations: Actress, producer
- Years active: 1963–1985 (actress); 1983–2003 (producer)
- Known for: The Danny Kaye Show
- Spouse: Lawrence David Foldes
- Mother: Jeanne Baird
- Awards: Young Artist Former Child Star "Lifetime Achievement" Award; Montreal World Film Festival Excellence in Producing Award

Victoria Paige Meyerink is a producer and former child actress. At the age of four, Meyerink became Danny Kaye's co-star on the CBS variety series The Danny Kaye Show and, in 2006, was honored by the Young Artist Foundation with its Former Child Star "Lifetime Achievement" Award for her role on the series.

== Biography ==
The daughter of actress Jeanne Baird, Meyerink became a model when she was two and a half years old. Although she received a season-long contract to perform on The Danny Kaye Show, she left the program after the laughter of the audience began to upset her. She was the subject of a feature article in the March 19, 1965, issue of LIFE.

She went on to co-star with Anne Francis in Brainstorm, with Clint Walker in The Night of the Grizzly and with Elvis Presley in Speedway, in which her character longs to marry Elvis’ character, prompting Elvis to sing “Your Time Hasn’t Come Yet, Baby.” On television she guest-starred on such notable shows as Green Acres, My Three Sons and Family Affair.

== Filmography ==
Actress – Film
Year	Title	Role	Notes
1965	Brainstorm	Julie	
1966	The Night of the Grizzly	Gypsy Cole	
1968	Speedway	Ellie Esterlake	
1970	Breakout	Marian	TV movie
1971	The Andromeda Strain	Unknown	Uncredited
1972	Gidget Gets Married	Janie	TV movie
1976	Time Travelers	Betty	TV movie
1976	Joy Ride: An Auto Theft	Vicky	Educational Short
1977	Don't Push, I'll Charge When I'm Ready	Lauren	TV movie
Actress – Television
Year	Title	Role	Notes
1963	The Littlest Hobo	Unknown	(unknown episodes)
1964–1967	The Danny Kaye Show	Herself	(unknown episodes)
1967	Tarzan	Mandy	Episode: "Jungle Dragnet"
1968	The Name of the Game	Nancy Farrell	Episode: "Nightmare"
1970	Green Acres	Lori Baker	5 episodes
1971	My Three Sons	Margaret Spencer	Episode: "The Love God"
1970–1971	Family Affair	Cindy, Girl, Angela Clayton	3 episodes
1971	Adam-12	Denise	Episode: "Log 125: A Safe Job"
1978	ABC Afterschool Special	Melissa Harrington	Episode: "It Isn't Easy Being a Teenage Millionaire"
1985	Our Time	Herself	Episode: "Episode No. 1.7"
Producer
Year	Title	Role	Notes
1983	The Graduates of Malibu High	Producer	Also known as Young Warriors
1987	Nightforce	Producer	
1991	Primadonnas: Rebels Without a Clue	Producer	Also known as Social Suicide
2003	Finding Home	Producer	

== Enternal links ==
- Victoria Paige Meyerink at IMDb
- Official "Finding Home" site
- Victoria Paige Meyerink on TV.com
- Victoria Paige Meyerink Interview with Joe Krein at Elvis2001.net
