= Malibu High =

- Theatrical release poster
- Directed by: Irvin Berwick
- Written by: John Buckley; Tom Singer
- Produced by: Lawrence D. Foldes; Tom Singer
- Starring: Jill Lansing; Stuart Taylor; Katie Johnson; Phyllis Benson
- Cinematography: William DeDiego
- Edited by: Dan Perry
- Music by: Alan Tew
- Distributed by: Crown International Pictures
- Release date: May 1979
- Running time: 92 minutes
- Country: United States
- Language: English
- Budget: $100,000
- Box office: $8 million

Malibu High is a 1979 American exploitation film directed by Irvin Berwick and starring Jill Lansing. The film led to a quasi-sequel, The Graduates of Malibu High.

One song by Alan Tew, "The Big One", played during the film, was later the theme song to The People's Court.

== Synopsis ==
High school student Kim Bentley is having a tough time of things at the moment. She has been dumped by her boyfriend Kevin for rich girl Annette. Her grades are slipping, she has no money, and all her mother seems to care about is cleaning. Kim tells her best friend Lucy that the nonsense ends today. Kim's been feeling sorry for herself ever since her father hanged himself.

She begins working for Tony the pimp and things start to look good for her, new clothes, new car and good grades. Annette begins to hate Kim even more and Kevin becomes jealous. Kim then meets Lance who frees her from turning tricks in a beat up old van which leads her to better clothes and nicer cars. Prostitution isn't the worst of it as Kim is forced to kill a man in self-defense when he tries to have his way with her being tied up. Kim becomes a hit woman and after murdering several people, including Annette and her father, she herself is killed on a deserted beach.

== Cast ==
- Jill Lansing as Kim Bentley
- Stuart Taylor as Kevin
- Katie Johnson as Lucy
- Phyllis Benson as Mrs. Bentley
- Alex Mann as Tony (credited as Al Mannino)
- Tammy Taylor as Annette Ingersoll
- Garth Howard as Lance
- John Harmon as Mr. Elmhurst

== Home media ==
The film was released on DVD on September 11, 2007, by BCI/Eclipse as part of a "Welcome to the Grindhouse Double Feature" along with Trip with the Teacher. It was later released on Blu-ray by Vinegar Syndrome on May 30, 2017.
