= The Graduates of Malibu High =

Young Warriors
- Directed by: Lawrence D. Foldes
- Written by: Russell W. Colgin; Lawrence D. Foldes
- Produced by: Victoria Paige Meyerink
- Starring: James Van Patten; Anne Lockhart; Tom Reilly; Ernest Borgnine; Richard Roundtree; Lynda Day George; Dick Shawn; Mike Norris
- Cinematography: Mac Ahlberg
- Edited by: Ted Nicolaou
- Music by: Rob Walsh
- Production companies: Star Cinema Productions; Cannon Films
- Distributed by: Cannon Releasing
- Release date: August 26, 1983
- Running time: 105 minutes
- Country: United States
- Language: English
- Box office: $238,534 (US)

The Graduates of Malibu High is an American crime drama film starring James Van Patten, Anne Lockhart, Ernest Borgnine, Richard Roundtree, and Lynda Day George. It is known as Young Warriors in the United Kingdom. It was the last film George appeared in before she retired from acting. The Graduates of Malibu High was released theatrically by Cannon Films on August 26, 1983. It has only been released on VHS and on Laserdisc in the United Kingdom.

== Plot ==
Malibu High graduate and college student Kevin Carrigan enjoys a typical student life, with his fraternity friends including Fred and Scott. When his sister Tiffany is gang raped and murdered by a gang of vicious bikers, he becomes withdrawn and violent, despite the help of his girlfriend Lucy and police lieutenant father. Kevin, with the aid of his college friends, sets out to avenge his sister's death, and they become a vigilante group, obsessed with violence and confronting all crime in the city.

== Cast ==
- James Van Patten as Kevin Carrigan
- Anne Lockhart as Lucy
- Tom Reilly as Scott
- Ernest Borgnine as Lieutenant Bob Carrigan
- Richard Roundtree as Sergeant John Austin
- Lynda Day George as Beverly Carrigan
- Ed De Stefane as Stan
- Dick Shawn as Professor Hoover
- Mike Norris as Fred
- Linnea Quigley as Ginger
- John Alden as Jorge
- April Dawn as Tiffany Carrigan

== Production ==
The Graduates of Malibu High was intended as a sequel to Malibu High. It was produced on a budget of just $1 million, most of which was spent on effects shots and employing big-name actors Ernest Borgnine, Richard Roundtree, Linda Day George, and Dick Shawn in small roles. To accommodate the small budget, many of the cast and crew were given limited partnerships in the movie in lieu of salaries, meaning their only payment would be a share of the movie's profits, if there were any.

Participants in The Graduates of Malibu High publicly spoke of chronic disorganization and poor working conditions during filming, which was scheduled to take six weeks but instead took three months. In particular, the film's assistant director Michael Sourapas said that the director/co-writer Lawrence D. Foldes neglected to do storyboarding, conduct rehearsals, or visit filming locations before a scheduled shoot, and consequently would have to spend hours just setting up cameras on the day of filming; lead actress Anne Lockhart likewise said that Foldes exhibited an appalling lack of experience with both cameras and actors, and once took 13 1/2 hours just to film a shot of a car passing in front of a house. Deran Sarafian claimed he took over direction after just two weeks due to the troubles. Foldes denied all of this, saying that the production went only two or three weeks past schedule, that Sarafin's contribution was limited to ten days serving as second assistant director, and that stories of serious difficulties during the making of the film were fabricated by disgruntled and underperforming cast and crew. The film was produced by Victoria Paige Meyerink.
