= The Night of the Grizzly =

1966 film

- Theatrical release poster
- Directed by: Joseph Pevney
- Screenplay by: Warren Douglas
- Produced by: Burt Dunne
- Starring: Clint Walker; Martha Hyer
- Cinematography: Loyal Griggs; Harold Lipstein
- Music by: Leith Stevens
- Production company: Paramount Pictures
- Distributed by: Paramount Pictures
- Release date: April 20, 1966
- Running time: 102 minutes
- Country: United States
- Language: English
- Box office: $1 million (est. US/ Canada rentals)

The Night of the Grizzly is a 1966 Western film starring Clint Walker, Martha Hyer, Keenan Wynn, Jack Elam and Nancy Kulp. Directed by Joseph Pevney and written by Warren Douglas, the film was released by Paramount Pictures on April 20, 1966. It was Pevney's final feature film.

The film's plot centers around Marshall "Big Jim" Cole (Clint Walker), who inherits land in Wyoming and trades his dangerous lawman's life for the life of a rancher. But he barely gets his family settled when new dangers plague them – a treacherous grizzly bear is on a murderous rampage; angry neighbors covet Cole's property, and an outlaw he once sent to prison seeks revenge.

The film contains scenery from Holcomb Valley, Big Bear Lake, California, United States and Big Bear Valley, San Bernardino National Forest, California, United States.

== Plot ==
Jim Cole, his wife Angela, their children Charlie and Gypsy, niece Meg, and friend Sam Potts arrive in a small Wyoming town. Jim inherited a ranch and quit his job as a lawman to become a rancher. In town, banker Mr. Benson mentions a $675 mortgage on the property. Jim hesitates to take the land title, since it would take nearly all their savings, but eventually relents. Rancher Jed Curry initially owned the property but lost it to Jim's late uncle in a card game and wants it back.

In the countryside, the Coles arrive at the ranch's cottage, which is a tumbled-down shack. The next morning, Jim builds a fence. Jed tries to persuade Jim to sell the land, to no avail.

Jim returns to town the next day and asks Wilhelmina Peterson, who owns the general store, if she knows where he can buy cattle to breed with his prize bull Duncan. She asks her sidekick Hank to bring Jim to Hazel Squires' place. There, Hazel says that she can sell cattle for a buck each. When she goes to a pen to check on the pigs, she finds them all missing or dead; it is the work of Satan, a grizzly bear who invades ranches and kills livestock. Many tried to kill Satan, to no avail.

During the night, Satan reaches the Cole place, killing Duncan, causing Sam's mule to flee, and badly injuring the family's dog. The next morning, while the doctor stitches up the dog, Jim and Meg go to the store for coffee. However, the Curry boys are there with cohorts and start harassing Jim. A fight starts, with the Curry sons driven out. Jed later chastises his sons, telling them not to antagonize Jim if they are to get his ranch.

Needing a replacement bull but with no money to buy one, Jim gets a loan from the bank, giving Benson various possessions as collateral. He goes to the Squires ranch to purchase the bull and cattle for breeding. After learning of the loan, Jed warns Benson not to do it again and reminds him that he, as the bank's major stockholder, has the authority to do this.

While working on the farm, the Coles and Sam see the mule appear. However, it is badly-injured, dying minutes later. Distraught, Sam and Jim vow to kill Satan.

While tracking Satan through the woods, Jim and Sam are attacked, but escape by jumping off a cliff into a lake. While returning home from a dance social, the Coles find that Satan has killed most of their cattle. Again, Jim goes to Benson for a loan to buy replacement animals. However, this time, Benson refuses his request. Satan's depredations reach a crisis point, and Jed posts a $750 reward for anyone who can kill the bear. Because of this, bounty hunter Cass Dowdy appears in town with hunting dogs. Jim sent Cass to jail for two years for murder. Cass plans to hunt the bear just so Jim does not get the reward money and thus ruin him financially.

Jim and Sam set a trap for Satan and doze off while waiting. Satan attacks again, driving off one of the horses and killing Sam. Dowdy's dogs are also killed by Satan. More traps are set up for Satan, to no avail. One night, Dowdy visits one of Jim's traps to sabotage it but is accidentally injured instead. The next morning, the two meet again and fight, with Jim winning and leaving Cass there.

At home, Jim calms down a distraught Angela. The next morning, he finds that Charlie has gone after Satan alone. Jim follows Charlie into the woods.

In the woods, Jim again runs into Dowdy, who almost kills him. However, Jim fights back and drives him away. At night, Satan attacks Charlie and chases him up a tree. Charlie jumps out of the tree and distracts Satan, while Dowdy fires at the bear to save the boy, but is fatally mauled. Jim then injures Satan and shoots him dead. After comforting a dying Dowdy, who sacrificed himself to save Charlie, Jim and Charlie return home.

== Cast ==
- Clint Walker as Jim Cole
- Martha Hyer as Angela Cole
- Keenan Wynn as Jed Curry
- Nancy Kulp as Wilhelmina Peterson
- Candy Moore as Meg
- Kevin Brodie as Charlie Cole
- Ellen Corby as Hazel Squires
- Jack Elam as Hank
- Leo Gordon as Cass Dowdy
- Ron Ely as Tad Curry
- Sammy Jackson as Cal Curry
- Med Flory as Duke Squires
- Don Haggerty as Sam Potts
- Regis Toomey as Cotton Benson
- Victoria Paige Meyerink as Gypsy Cole
- Warren Douglas as the Minister

== Comic book adaption ==
- Dell Movie Classic: The Night of the Grizzly (December 1966)

== See also ==
- Holcomb Valley
