= Matthew and Son (album) =

Studio album by Cat Stevens
- Released: 10 March 1967
- Recorded: 14 July 1966 – 1 February 1967
- Studios: Decca Studios, West Hampstead, London
- Genres: Folk rock; baroque pop
- Length: 35:21
- Label: Deram
- Producers: Mike Hurst, Vic Smith (engineer)

Cat Stevens chronology
Matthew and Son (1967)	New Masters (1967)

Singles from Matthew and Son
- 1. "I Love My Dog" Released: 30 September 1966; 2. "Matthew and Son" Released: 30 December 1966

Matthew and Son is the debut studio album by British singer-songwriter Cat Stevens, released in March 1967. It reached the top ten on several UK charts, and at the time established Stevens as a successful teenage pop star.

== Overview ==
Stevens began writing songs during his early teenage years. His earliest influences included the sound of early British bands, such as the Beatles and the Rolling Stones, influenced by popular American rhythm and blues. At the same time, folk influences from artists such as Bob Dylan and Simon & Garfunkel left a strong mark on him, along with some of the musicals being performed so close to his childhood home in Soho that he could often hear them drifting through his room. Stevens's older brother, David Gordon, attracted the attention of music producer Mike Hurst, formerly of the Springfields, in the hope of finding a producer interested in his younger brother's music. After a demo was recorded, a deal was struck between the two. The album was not released until 1967; however, recording began on 10 July 1966, with a few advance singles appearing around that time.

== Advance singles ==
Although the album was not released until 1967, the first advance single, "I Love My Dog", was released in 1966. It was initially recorded only by Stevens' guitars, piano and vocals. Hurst, however, encouraged Stevens to add a staccato and tympani–and–viola arrangement. Session bassist John Paul Jones played on the first singles two years before becoming a member of Led Zeppelin. The lyrics for the B-side of the first single, "Portobello Road", were written by Kim Fowley, who encouraged Stevens to compose a melody for the song. The single initially reached No. 28 on the UK charts, followed by "Matthew and Son", the next single and title track, which went to No. 2 on the UK charts, making Stevens into a popular and clean-cut teenage crooner.

== Release and reception ==
Matthew and Son was released in 1967, eventually reaching number seven on the Record Retailer albums chart in May of that year. The album track "Here Comes My Baby" was initially recorded and released by the Tremeloes, and was a hit, reaching No. 4 in the UK. "I've Found a Love" was covered by British singer David Garrick but failed to chart, while Stevens's own "I'm Gonna Get Me a Gun" reached No. 6.

"Here Comes My Baby" was used in the Wes Anderson film Rushmore.

Music critic Robert Christgau of The Village Voice later called Matthew and Son "a rarity: a forgotten record that shouldn't be", and said that both its title track and "I Love My Dog" were "two rock songs we should have heard more of in 1967". AllMusic's Bruce Eder gave it three-and-a-half out of five stars and said that "it's very distant from the sound that Stevens was ultimately known for, and in many ways, it's more dated than what he did for Island/A&M, but it's much more self-consciously accessible, arranged in different styles".

== Track listing ==
=== UK edition ===
All tracks are written by Cat Stevens, except "Portobello Road" co-written by Kim Fowley and "I Love My Dog", which Stevens retrospectively gave Yusef Lateef co-writing credit for. Track lengths adapted from the 1988 re-issue of Matthew and Son.

Side one

1. "Matthew and Son" – 2:42
2. "I Love My Dog" – 2:21
3. "Here Comes My Baby" – 2:55
4. "Bring Another Bottle Baby" – 2:42
5. "Portobello Road" – 2:25
6. "I've Found a Love" – 2:29
7. "I See a Road" – 2:08

Side two

1. "Baby Get Your Head Screwed on" – 2:20
2. "Granny" – 3:10
3. "When I Speak to the Flowers" – 2:22
4. "The Tramp" – 2:06
5. "Come on and Dance" – 2:07
6. "Hummingbird" – 2:34
7. "Lady" – 3:00

=== US edition ===
All tracks are written by Cat Stevens, except "I Love My Dog", which Stevens retrospectively gave Yusef Lateef co-writing credit for. Track lengths adapted from the 1988 re-issue of Matthew & Son.

Side one

1. "Matthew and Son" – 2:42
2. "I Love My Dog" – 2:21
3. "Here Comes My Baby" – 2:55
4. "Bring Another Bottle Baby" – 2:42
5. "I've Found a Love" – 2:25
6. "I See a Road" – 2:08

Side two

1. "I'm Gonna Get Me a Gun" – 2:11
2. "School is Out" – 2:55
3. "Baby Get Your Head Screwed on" – 2:20
4. "When I Speak to the Flowers" – 2:22
5. "Hummingbird" – 2:34
6. "Lady" – 3:00

== Personnel ==
- Cat Stevens - vocals, guitar, keyboards
- John Paul Jones - bass guitar on "Matthew and Son"
- Nicky Hopkins - keyboards on "Matthew and Son"
- Alan Tew and Mike Hurst - arrangements

Technical

- Mike Hurst - producer, engineer, liner notes
- Vic Smith - engineer

== Charts ==
Weekly chart performance for Matthew and Son
Chart (1967–1971)	Peak position
UK Disc and Music Echo Top Ten LPs	9
UK Melody Maker Top Ten LPs	8
UK New Musical Express Top 15 LPs	8
UK Record Retailer LPs Chart	7
US Billboard 200	173
