= I Love My Dog =

- Italian single issue cover

Single by Cat Stevens
- B-side: "Portobello Road"
- Released: 30 September 1966
- Recorded: 10 July 1966
- Studio: Decca, London
- Genre: Folk rock; soft rock
- Length: 2:26
- Label: Deram
- Songwriters: Cat Stevens; Yusef Lateef
- Producer: Mike Hurst

Cat Stevens singles chronology
"I Love My Dog" (1966)	"Matthew and Son" (1966)

Audio
- "I Love My Dog" on YouTube

"I Love My Dog" is a song written by Cat Stevens, and was his first single (b/w "Portobello Road"), appearing the following year on his debut album Matthew and Son. Stevens later acknowledged that he had essentially written the lyrics to the music of American jazz multi-instrumentalist Yusef Lateef's "The Plum Blossom", from his 1961 Eastern Sounds. Stevens indicated that he "told Yusef Lateef about it, gave him a big cheque, and in fact, started paying him royalties." The song is now released with credits that include Yusef Lateef.

The B-side, "Portobello Road", is about the famous street of the same name and market in London, England. The song lyric was written by American Kim Fowley, and Stevens was asked to collaborate by composing music for it. It was later covered by Stevens' first guitarist, Alun Davies, after signing with Island Records in 1970. Davies' version appeared on his first solo album, Daydo, in 1972.

"I Love My Dog" peaked at No. 28 in the UK Singles Chart in November 1966, spending seven weeks on that chart. In Canada it reached No. 45.

The song has also been covered by Carolyn Hester, Theo Bikel, Linda Tillery, and Mike Batt.

== Composition ==
Lyrically, Stevens was inspired by his family's dachshund Pepe.

== Personnel ==
- Cat Stevens – vocals, guitar
- Alan Tew – orchestral arrangements

== Charts ==
Chart (1966–1967)	Peak position
Canada (RPM)	45
Netherlands (Veronica Top 40)	21
Netherlands (Single Top 100)	16
UK (Disc and Music Echo Top 50)	31
UK (Melody Maker Pop 50)	29
UK (New Musical Express Top 30)	28
UK (Record Retailer Top 50)	28
US (Billboard Bubbling Under Hot 100)	118
US (Cash Box Looking Ahead)	106
US (Record World Singles Coming Up)	112
