= Alan Tew =

British composer and arranger

- Born: Alan Stanley Tew; 7 July 1930; Leytonstone, London, England
- Origin: United Kingdom
- Died: 10 January 1997 (aged 66) Winterton-on-Sea, Norfolk, England
- Genres: Music
- Occupations: Composer, arranger
- Instrument: Piano
- Label: Pye

Alan Stanley Tew was a British composer and arranger.

== Career ==
Tew got his start in the 1950s as the pianist and arranger for the Len Turner Band.

Tew composed the song "Zoo Be Zoo Be Zoo" with Bill Shepherd, originally performed by Sophia Loren in 1960. The song enjoyed a resurgence of popularity in 2012 after appearing in the TV show Mad Men.

During his career, Tew released a number of orchestral albums, including This Is My Scene (1967), recorded in Phase 4 Stereo, and The Magnificent Westerns (1969), on CBS Records. Tew also led his own orchestra, the Alan Tew Orchestra, in the 1970s. He also collaborated with Cat Stevens.

Tew was a composer of library music in the United Kingdom, and many of his cues subsequently became themes for television programmes in that region. These include Doctor in the House (titled "Bond Street Parade") and ...And Mother Makes Three. Some of his library music was used as the score for the 1970s series The Hanged Man and was released as the LPs Drama Suite Part I and Drama Suite Part II. Some of these cues also later appeared as incidental music in The Two Ronnies, The Sweeney and SpongeBob SquarePants.

One of Tew's library themes from the 1970s, "The Big One", would eventually be used as the theme for the American television series The People's Court. "The Big One" would also be used in the "Gold Plated Delinquents" episode of the British detective show Van der Valk (1977), as well as the erotic films Barbara Broadcast (1977), The Satisfiers of Alpha Blue (1980), and Malibu High (1979).

Some of Tew's funk-influenced work was included in the score for the 2009 film Black Dynamite and was subsequently sampled by various hip-hop artists, including Jay-Z, Snoop Dogg and Ice Cube.
