= Majikat =

Live album by Cat Stevens
- Released: 21 September 2004
- Recorded: 22 February 1976
- Venues: William & Mary College, Williamsburg, Virginia
- Genre: Folk rock
- Length: 78:09
- Label: Eagle
- Producer: Rocky Oldham

Cat Stevens chronology
Night of Remembrance (as Yusuf Islam) (2004)	Majikat (2004)	An Other Cup (as Yusuf) (2006)

Majikat is a CD and DVD live album by British singer-songwriter Cat Stevens. It was recorded during the US leg of Stevens' Earth Tour 1976, but was not released until 2004, by which time the artist was known as Yusuf Islam.

Professional ratings
Review scores
Source	Rating
Allmusic	link

== Track listing ==
All songs written by Cat Stevens, except where noted.

DVD

1. "The Doves" (Majikat Tour Theme)" (DVD Only)
2. "The Wind"
3. "Moonshadow"
4. "Where Do the Children Play?"
5. "Another Saturday Night" (Sam Cooke) – 2:35
6. "Hard Headed Woman"
7. "Miles From Nowhere" (DVD Only)
8. "King of Trees"
9. "C79"
10. "Lady D'Arbanville"
11. "Banapple Gas"
12. "Majik of Majiks"
13. "Tuesday's Dead"
14. "Oh Very Young"
15. "The Hurt"
16. "Sad Lisa"
17. "Two Fine People"
18. "Fill My Eyes"
19. "Father and Son"
20. "Ruins" (DVD Only)
21. "Peace Train"

The concert first encore, "Wild World", appears on the DVD as a bonus feature along with other archive material i.e. the three live tracks:

- "If I Laugh" from BBC 'Old Grey Whistle Test' 1971;
- "Maybe You're Right" from BBC 'In Concert' 1971;
- "Tuesday's Dead" from Granada 'Out Front' 1971.

CD

1. "Wild World" – 3:03
2. "The Wind" – 1:38
3. "Moonshadow" – 2:43
4. "Where Do the Children Play?" – 3:20
5. "Another Saturday Night" (Sam Cooke) – 2:35
6. "Hard Headed Woman" – 3:54
7. "King of Trees" – 3:28
8. "C79" – 3:08
9. "Lady D'Arbanville" – 3:47
10. "Banapple Gas" – 3:08
11. "Majik of Majiks" – 4:27
12. "Tuesday's Dead" – 4:06
13. "Oh Very Young" – 2:24
14. "How Can I Tell You" – 4:10 (CD Only)
15. "The Hurt" – 4:54
16. "Sad Lisa" – 3:26
17. "Two Fine People" – 3:47
18. "Fill My Eyes" – 3:01
19. "Father and Son" – 4:10
20. "Peace Train" – 3:58

== Concert setlist ==
Set 1

1. "The Doves (Instrumental Intro)"
2. "The Wind"
3. "Moonshadow"
4. "Where Do the Children Play?"
5. "Another Saturday Night" (Sam Cooke)
6. "Hard Headed Woman"
7. "Sitting"
8. "Whistlestar"
9. "King of Trees"
10. "Sun/C79"
11. "Lady D'Arbanville"
12. "Banapple Gas"

Set 2

1. "Majik of Majiks"
2. "Tuesday's Dead"
3. "Oh Very Young"
4. "How Can I Tell You"
5. "The Hurt"
6. "Miles From Nowhere"
7. "Sad Lisa"
8. "Two Fine People"
9. "Fill My Eyes"
10. "Father and Son"
11. "Ruins"
12. "Peace Train"

Encore

1. "Wild World"
2. "Jzero"

== Personnel ==
- Cat Stevens – guitars, piano, vocals
- Alun Davies – guitars, vocals
- Mark Warner – guitars, bouzouki
- Bruce Lynch – bass guitar
- Jean Roussel – Hammond organ, clavinet, electric piano, synthesizer
- Gerry Conway – drums, percussion
- Chico Batera – percussion
- Larry Steele – percussion, flute, acoustic guitar, bass guitar
- Kimberley Carlson – backing vocals
- Angela Howell – backing vocals
- Suzanne Lynch – backing vocals

== Certifications and sales ==
Region	Certification	Certified units/sales
Australia (ARIA) dvd	3× Platinum	45,000^{^}
Canada (Music Canada) dvd	2× Platinum	20,000^{^}
^{^} Shipments figures based on certification alone.
