= Saturnight =

Live album by Cat Stevens
- Released: 8 November 1974 (Japan); 29 November 2024 (Worldwide)
- Recorded: 22 June 1974
- Venues: Sunplaza Hall, Nakano, Tokyo, Japan
- Genres: Soft rock, folk rock
- Length: 41:01
- Label: A&M
- Producer: Cat Stevens

Cat Stevens chronology
Buddha and the Chocolate Box (1974)	Saturnight (1974)	Greatest Hits (1975)

Saturnight (subtitled Live in Tokyo) is the first live album by Cat Stevens. Proceeds from the album went to support UNICEF. Originally released in Japan, it was later released worldwide on Black Friday 2024. It had not received a global release prior to 2024 due to contractual obligations between A&M and Island Records. The album was recorded on 22 June 1974, during the Japanese leg of Stevens's "Bamboozle World Tour".

Professional ratings
Review scores
Source	Rating
AllMusic	2.5/5 stars

== Track listing ==
=== Side one ===
1. "Wild World" – 3:28
2. "Oh Very Young" – 2:27
3. "Sitting" – 3:14
4. "Where Do the Children Play?" – 3:38
5. "Lady D'Arbanville" – 4:01
6. "Another Saturday Night" – 2:37

=== Side two ===
1. "Hard Headed Woman" – 3:42
2. "Peace Train" – 3:27
3. "Father and Son" – 3:37
4. "King of Trees" – 3:49
5. "A Bad Penny" – 3:43
6. "Bitterblue" – 3:18
- All songs written by Cat Stevens, except "Another Saturday Night" (Sam Cooke).

== Personnel ==
- Cat Stevens – vocals, acoustic guitar, piano
- Alun Davies – guitar, backing vocals
- Larry Steele – guitars, percussion, backing vocals
- Jim Cregan – guitar
- Jean Roussel – keyboards
- Bruce Lynch – bass guitar
- Gerry Conway – drums, percussion
- Anna Peacock – backing vocals
- Suzanne Lynch – backing vocals

== Charts ==
Chart performance for Saturnight
Chart (2026)	Peak position
French Rock & Metal Albums (SNEP)	87
