= Foreigner (Cat Stevens album) =

Studio album by Cat Stevens
- Released: July 1973
- Recorded: March 1973
- Studios: Dynamic Studios, Kingston, Jamaica; Atlantic Studios, New York
- Genres: R&B, soul
- Length: 36:09
- Labels: Island (UK/Europe); A&M (US/Canada)
- Producer: Cat Stevens

Cat Stevens chronology
Catch Bull at Four (1972)	Foreigner (1973)	Buddha and the Chocolate Box (1974)

Singles from Foreigner
- 1. "The Hurt" Released: 1973

Professional ratings
Review scores
Source	Rating
AllMusic	3/5 stars

Foreigner is the seventh studio album released by British singer-songwriter Cat Stevens in July 1973. In addition to the minor hit "The Hurt", which received a moderate amount of airplay, Foreigner also included such songs as "100 I Dream" and the 18-minute-long "Foreigner Suite", which took up the entirety of side one. It is the first album written and produced solely by Stevens. It was mostly recorded in Jamaica using a brand new musical group, except for Jean Roussel on keys. The title comes from the feeling of being "a bit of an outsider" to R&B and soul music, Foreigner's genres, as well as Stevens's experience living in Brazil as a tax exile.

Although Foreigner sold well, with the album reaching No. 3 on both sides of the Atlantic, it was not favorably reviewed, and its release was not followed by a tour. In Canada, the album was ranked at number 100 for its first three weeks before jumping to number 48. It reached its peak of number 5 in the ninth week.

== Background ==
At the pinnacle of Stevens' success with four consecutive Platinum and Gold albums: Mona Bone Jakon, Tea for the Tillerman, Teaser and the Firecat, and Catch Bull at Four, Stevens had a dedicated audience and fan base who wanted more. However, he himself thought his music too predictable, leaving him in a creative rut. He decided to write and produce his next album himself, surprising many others, given that Alun Davies, his close friend and first guitar in his backing band, and his producer, Paul Samwell-Smith (formerly of the Yardbirds) in particular, were instrumental in assisting Stevens to form the definitive signature sound that had brought Stevens to the height of his stardom. Seeking an alternative, he focused on the kinds of music that had begun to inspire him, which he heard on the radio: R&B music.

Bands that moved him included the Blue Notes and Stevie Wonder. Stevens came to realise that the music that he had always loved originated not as rock and roll, but what he had been introduced to as "black music". Lead Belly instantly came to mind, who had been one of his favourites. In his mind, he'd learned about "black music" almost through the back door, while also being moved toward both musicals and acoustic folk music. In deciding to drop all the musical influences in his band, he hoped to foster those early soulful sounds himself. In an interview with Circus Magazine, Stevens said: "If black music was happening, I decided to just get down to it. And because I was a stranger in the world of black sounds, I called the album Foreigner." An additional reason for Foreigner's title is because of Stevens's short-time residency in Brazil as a tax exile.

On 9 November 1973, Stevens performed the song on ABC's In Concert, a 90-minute program they named the Moon & Star, including the full 18-minute "Foreigner Suite" without commercial interruption.

In 2009, Stevens (now known as Yusuf Islam) entered into legal proceedings alongside Joe Satriani in a lawsuit against the band Coldplay, alleging that they had (at least unintentionally) plagiarised respective works by both artists ("If I Could Fly" by Satriani and Stevens' "Foreigner Suite") for the melody to Coldplay's "Viva la Vida" from their Grammy Award winning album, Viva la Vida or Death and All His Friends.

== Critical reception ==
Stephen Holden of Rolling Stone called Foreigner "difficult to listen to" and "painful to review", beginning by criticizing Stevens's singing as becoming "increasingly ragged" since Tea for the Tillerman, adding that the album is mostly "[Stevens] choking on his own words." He heavily criticized the 18-minute "Foreigner Suite", stating "it abounds in trite, undeveloped little melodies and tedious passages of instrumental filler" and the lyrics "among the most disconnected that Cat has ever written" as well as "simplistic claptrap". He characterized "How Many Times" as "a decaffeinated R&B-flavored ballad", "barely passable", and "100 I Dream" he labeled a "shallow, preachy succession of cliches". He concluded his review by stating "Cat is apparently the least intelligent" out of other popular singer/songwriters.

In a review for AllMusic, William Ruhlmann was gentler towards the "Suite", complimenting the "compelling melodic sections and typically emotive singing", but felt the "Suite" would have been better divided into several smaller tracks. The full 18 minutes, however, he expressed as a series of "tantalizing fragments". He described the songwriting and arrangement of "The Hurt" as "overly busy", noting that the album was "a slight fall-off in quality from Catch Bull at Four.

== Track listing ==
All tracks written by Cat Stevens.

Side one

1. "Foreigner Suite" – 18:19

Side two

1. "The Hurt" – 4:18
2. "How Many Times" – 4:26
3. "Later" – 4:44
4. "100 I Dream" – 4:09

== Personnel ==
- Cat Stevens – vocals, piano, keyboards, acoustic guitar, synthesizer, guitar synthesizer, clavinet, RMI electric piano, string/brass/wood arrangements
- Jean Roussel – keyboards, string/brass/wood arrangements
- Phil Upchurch – electric guitar
- Paul Martinez – bass guitar
- Herbie Flowers – bass guitar on "How Many Times"
- Bernard Purdie – drums, percussion
- Gerry Conway – drums, percussion on "Foreigner Suite"
- Patti Austin – vocals
- Barbara Massey – vocals
- Tasha Thomas – vocals
- Tower of Power – horns

== Charts ==
Chart (1973)	Peak position
Australian Albums (Kent Music Report)	4
Canada Top Albums/CDs (RPM)	5
Finnish Albums (Suomen virallinen lista)	9
German Albums (Offizielle Top 100)	18
Italian Albums (Musica e Dischi)	5
Norwegian Albums (VG-lista)	1
UK Albums (Official Charts)	3
US Billboard Top LPs & Tape	3
