= Greatest Hits (Cat Stevens album) =

Greatest hits album by Cat Stevens
- Released: 20 June 1975
- Genres: Folk rock; soft rock
- Length: 39:16
- Labels: A&M (US, Canada, Japan); Island (UK, Europe, Australia)
- Producers: Cat Stevens, Paul Samwell-Smith

Cat Stevens chronology
Saturnight (1974)	Greatest Hits (1975)	Numbers (1975)

Singles from Greatest Hits
- 1. "Two Fine People" Released: June 1975

Professional ratings
Review scores
Source	Rating
AllMusic	4.5/5 stars
Christgau's Record Guide	B−

Greatest Hits is a 1975 compilation album by British singer-songwriter Cat Stevens. It reached No. 2 in the UK Albums Chart and peaked at No. 6 on the Billboard 200. Though made up mostly of tracks from his five previous studio albums, Cat Stevens' Greatest Hits did contain one new song, "Two Fine People", which was also released as a single in 1975, and the previous non-album single, "Another Saturday Night". Those singles charted at No. 33 and No. 6, respectively, on the Billboard Hot 100 singles chart.

== Critical reception ==
In a review for AllMusic, Stephen Thomas Erlewine called the album "everything that casual fans need", adding that it was a "solid introduction and a great listen."

== Track listing ==
All tracks by Cat Stevens, unless otherwise noted.

=== Side one ===
1. "Wild World" – 3:22
2. "Oh Very Young" – 2:34
3. "Can't Keep It In" – 2:59
4. "Hard Headed Woman" – 3:49
5. "Moonshadow" – 2:49
6. "Two Fine People" – 3:33

=== Side two ===
1. "Peace Train" – 4:13
2. "Ready" – 3:16
3. "Father and Son" – 3:41
4. "Sitting" – 3:13
5. "Morning Has Broken" (Eleanor Farjeon) – 3:18
6. "Another Saturday Night" (Sam Cooke) – 2:29

== Charts ==
=== Weekly charts ===
Chart (1975–77)	Peak position
Australian Albums (Kent Music Report)	41
Canada Top Albums/CDs (RPM)	1
Finnish Albums (Suomen virallinen lista)	11
German Albums (Offizielle Top 100)	6
Italian Albums (Musica e Dischi)	15
New Zealand Albums (RMNZ)	10
Norwegian Albums (VG-lista)	14
Swedish Albums (Sverigetopplistan)	5
UK Albums (Official Charts)	2
US Billboard 200	6

=== Year-end charts ===
Chart (1975)	Position
UK Albums (OCC)	21
Chart (1976)	Position
German Albums (Offizielle Top 100)	7
Chart (1977)	Position
German Albums (Offizielle Top 100)	17

== Certifications and sales ==
Region	Certification	Certified units/sales
Germany (BVMI)	2× Platinum	1,000,000^{^}
Sweden	—	150,000
United Kingdom (BPI)	Gold	100,000^{^}
United States (RIAA)	4× Platinum	4,000,000^{^}
^{^} Shipments figures based on certification alone.
