= Anymore for Anymore =

Studio album by Ronnie Lane
- Released: July 1974
- Recorded: 1973–74
- Studio: Fishpool, Hyssington with Ronnie Lane's Mobile Studio; mixed at IBC Studios, London
- Genre: Folk rock
- Length: 40:37
- Label: GM Records
- Producer: Ronnie Lane (with Bruce Rowland and Glyn Johns)

Ronnie Lane chronology
Anymore for Anymore (1974)	Ronnie Lane's Slim Chance (1975)

Anymore for Anymore is the debut solo album by Ronnie Lane, one of the founding members of Small Faces and Faces. The recording sessions, using Ronnie Lane's Mobile Studio, started in 1973 at his 100-acre (40 ha) farm in Wales with his new band Slim Chance.

Lane had originally wanted to rechristen the Small Faces with the name Slim Chance in 1969 after Steve Marriott left the group, but when Ron Wood and then Rod Stewart joined them soon after, the other band members vetoed the idea and instead opted to slightly amend their existing name to Faces.

The Anymore for Anymore album showcases a more rootsy, folk, and country music-influenced sound than any albums he recorded with Faces, although Lane had already experimented heavily with these musical styles on his own compositions for that group as early as 1970.

The carefree nature of the album's recording is illustrated by the fact that the title track was spontaneously recorded on the hillside overlooking Lane's farm, where the sound of nearby cattle and a light wind picked up by the recording microphones added further rural ambience to the track.

The track "Tell Everyone" was a re-recording of a Lane song from the Faces' Long Player album.

== Critical reception ==
Professional ratings
Review scores
Source	Rating
AllMusic	4.5/5 stars
MusicHound Rock: The Essential Album Guide	2/5 stars
Q	4/5 stars
The Rolling Stone Album Guide	4/5 stars

Reviewing the song "The Poacher" for The Guardian in 2012, George Chesterton, wrote: "Pop lyrics can aspire only to be poetic – they are not poetry in themselves – but the lines 'Bring me fish with eyes of jewels and mirrors on their bodies / Bring them strong and bring them bigger than a newborn child' come pretty close. Thanks to the strings and oboe of the refrain and Lane's warm strumming, the music is as simple and as transcendent as the message."

== Reissues ==
The album has been rereleased four times to date on compact disc. It was first released on CD by Marquee Classic in 1990, and then by See For Miles in 1992, adding the B-side Done This One Before as a bonus track. A third release by NMC Music in 1997 added a number of alternate versions as bonus tracks. A fourth release by Alchemy Entertainment in 2003 also included the bonus tracks from the 1997 reissue, and added a second CD duplicating the tracks from the Tin and Tambourine compilation, which largely consists of alternate versions from the subsequent albums Ronnie Lane's Slim Chance, One for the Road and See Me. Currently, the album is not available on CD as a standalone release, but the version available on streaming services includes the bonus tracks from 2019's Just For a Moment box set.

== Track listing ==
Side one

No.	Title	Writer(s)	Length
1.	"Careless Love"	Traditional; arranged by Ronnie Lane	4:09
2.	"Don't You Cry for Me"	Ronnie Lane	4:26
3.	"Bye and Bye (Gonna See the King)"	Ronnie Lane	5:06
4.	"Silk Stockings"	Ronnie Lane, Kevin Westlake	1:48
5.	"The Poacher"	Ronnie Lane	3:45

Side two

No.	Title	Writer(s)	Length
1.	"Roll on Babe"	Derroll Adams	3:20
2.	"Tell Everyone"	Ronnie Lane	3:00
3.	"Amelia Earhart's Last Flight"	Dave McEnery, Lindsay McPhail	5:49
4.	"Anymore for Anymore"	Ronnie Lane, Kate Lambert	3:43
5.	"Only a Bird in a Gilded Cage"	Harry Von Tilzer	1:06
6.	"Chicken Wired"	Ronnie Lane	4:25

Bonus tracks (1997 NMC Music reissue)

No.	Title	Writer(s)	Length
1.	"How Come (acoustic version)"	Ronnie Lane / Kevin Westlake
2.	"The Poacher (different vocal mix)"	Ronnie Lane
3.	"Roll On Babe (remix)"	Derroll Adams
4.	"Anymore for Anymore (alternate version)"	Ronnie Lane, Kate Lambert
5.	"Bye and Bye (Gonna See the King) (remix)"	Ronnie Lane
6.	"Amelia Earhart's Last Flight (alternate version)"	Dave McEnery, Lindsay McPhail
7.	"Anymore for Anymore (alternate version, 'Ibiza 1972' - Faces rehearsal)"	Ronnie Lane

Bonus tracks (2003 Alchemy Entertainment reissue, CD2)

No.	Title	Writer(s)	Length
1.	"Give Me a Penny (alternate version)"	Ronnie Lane
2.	"Tin & Tambourine (alternate version)"	Ronnie Lane, Kate Lambert
3.	"You Never Can Tell (alternate version)"	Chuck Berry
4.	"Little Piece of Nothing (alternate version)"	Ronnie Lane
5.	"Winning with Women (unmastered version)"	Ronnie Lane, Kate Lambert
6.	"Rat's Tails (Catmelody) (Fishpool sessions)"	Ronnie Lane, Kate Lambert
7.	"Only You (from 'See Me')"	Ronnie Lane
8.	"Three Cool Cats (demo - alternate mix)"	Lieber/Stoller
9.	"Richmond (Faces alternate version)"	Ronnie Lane
10.	"You're So Rude (live Victoria Palace, 1975)"	Ronnie Lane, Ian McLagan
11.	"From the Late to the Early (live Victoria Palace, 1975)"	Ronnie Lane, Ron Wood
12.	"How Come (live Victoria Palace, 1975)"	Ronnie Lane, Kevin Westlake
13.	"Joyride (Steppin' and Reelin' alternate version)"	Ronnie Lane
14.	"Nobody's Listenin' (alternate version)"	Ronnie Lane
15.	"One for the Road (alternate version)"	Ronnie Lane
16.	"Innocence Lost (Last Orders / Well, Well Hello instrumental version)"	Ronnie Lane

== Personnel ==
- Ronnie Lane – guitar, bass, vocals
- Graham Lyle – banjo, mandolin, guitar
- Benny Gallagher – bass, guitar, accordion/squeeze box
- Kevin Westlake – guitar
- Billy Livsey - keyboards
- Ken Slaven – violin
- Steve Bingham – bass
- Jimmy Jewell – saxophone
- Bruce Rowland – drums
- The Tanners of Montgomery – backing vocals
- Jimmy Horowitz - string arrangement on "The Poacher"

== Production ==
- Producer: Ronnie Lane, Bruce Rowland on "Bye and Bye (Gonna See the King)" and "The Poacher", Glyn Johns on "Tell Everyone"
- Recording engineers: Hugh Jones, Andy Knight
- Artwork/sleeve Art: Paul Bevoir
- Liner notes: Alberto Mitchell, Wayne Pernu
