= Daydo =

Studio album by Alun Davies
- Released: August 1972
- Genres: Pop, rock, folk
- Label: Columbia
- Producers: Cat Stevens, Paul Samwell-Smith

Singles from Daydo
- 1. "Waste of Time" Released: 11 August 1972; 2. "I'm Late" Released: 1972; 3. "I'm Gonna Love You Too" Released: 1972; 4. "Market Place" Released: 1973 (Portugal)

Daydo is the debut solo studio album by Welsh guitarist Alun Davies, released in August 1972. Most of the album's songs are written by Davies, and supported by Cat Stevens on piano with other members of Stevens's band, including drummer Gerry Conway. Stevens also produced the album, along with Stevens's own producer Paul Samwell-Smith. Daydo received mixed reviews upon release, but peaked at number 43 in Australia.

== Overview ==
The album title, "Daydo", was the nickname Davies's friends gave him until age 17.

Daydo was described as having been "a long time in the planning"; some of its material was written up to two years prior to release. By the time the album was released, Davies had gained some fame playing as a guitarist for British singer-songwriter Cat Stevens, whom Davies had developed a close friendship with. Stevens and Paul Samwell-Smith produced Daydo for Davies. When asked why he didn't do it himself, he admitted that he felt incapable of both producing and keeping a clear mind over his concept for the finished product.

The third track on the album is a cover of Cat Stevens's song "Portobello Road", co-written by Kim Fowley.

The album was expected to be "the first of many", however no follow-up ever materialized.

== Reception ==
Richie Unterberger of AllMusic felt that the album sounded like "Stevens compositions being sung by a less talented singer". He added that at its best, it had some "pleasant if not terribly memorable" folk-rock tunes.

Melody Maker's Mark Plummer enjoyed Daydo, stating there were "plenty of good, interesting songs".

In a review for Rolling Stone, Stephen Holden complimented the three covers Davies recorded ("I'm Gonna Love You Too", "Portobello Road", and "I'm Late"); additionally describing Davies's debut as at times reminiscent of Stevens's 1971 album Teaser and the Firecat.

== Track listing ==
All songs written by Alun Davies except as noted.

=== Side one ===
1. "Market Place" - 3:49
2. "Old Bourbon" - 4:55
3. "Portobello Road" (Cat Stevens, Kim Fowley) - 2:24
4. "Poor Street" - 4:30
5. "Abram Brown Continued" (Davies, Jeremy Taylor) - 3:54

=== Side two ===
1. "Waste of Time" - 4:10
2. "I'm Gonna Love You Too" (Joe B. Mauldin, Niki Sullivan, Norman Petty) - 2:42
3. "Vale of Tears" - 5:07
4. "I'm Late" (Hilliard Goldsmith, Samuel Feinberg) - 2:32
5. "Young Warrior" - 2:57

== Charts ==
=== Weekly charts ===
Charts (1972–1973)	Peak position
Australia (Kent Music Report)	43
