= Buddha and the Chocolate Box =

Studio album by Cat Stevens
- Released: 21 March 1974
- Recorded: February 1974
- Studios: Sound Techniques Studios, London, England. Mixed at Sound Techniques, AIR Studios, and Morgan Studios, London.
- Genres: Soft rock; folk rock
- Length: 32:16
- Labels: Island (UK/Europe); A&M (US/Canada)
- Producers: Cat Stevens; Paul Samwell-Smith

Cat Stevens chronology
Foreigner (1973)	Buddha and the Chocolate Box (1974)	Saturnight (1974)

Singles from Buddha and the Chocolate Box
- 1. "Oh Very Young" Released: March 1974; 2. "Ready" Released: November 1974

Professional ratings
Review scores
Source	Rating
Allmusic	3/5 stars
Christgau's Record Guide	C−
Rolling Stone	(mixed)

Buddha and the Chocolate Box is the eighth studio album by Cat Stevens, released in March 1974. Its two singles, "Oh Very Young" and "Ready", reached no. 10 and no. 26 on the Billboard Hot 100, respectively. "Ready" also peaked at number 20 in Canada.

== Overview ==
Stevens's previous album, Foreigner, was a deviation from his signature sound, and it did not receive favourable reviews. Feeling Foreigner "detached" him from his casual fans, for Buddha, Stevens brought back his old producer Paul Samwell-Smith and returned to his classic acoustic-folk style. In an interview, Stevens said he "figured I'd better come back and show that I can still write the stuff they want."

The album's title comes from an experience Stevens had during a flight, when he found himself carrying a statue of Buddha in one hand and a box of chocolates in the other. Later, he reflected that if the plane had crashed, he would be caught between two objects: one that represented the spiritual and one the material. He said: "I suddenly realized that was all I had. Whether I died or not, it would just be the 'Buddha and the chocolate box'. I was trying to find the significance in that when I realized that was the significance. That's all that had to be known."

The song "Ghost Town" references several historical and political figures, including George Washington, Walt Disney, and King Tut, all together in a surreal afterlife setting. The track was influenced by Elton John and Neil Young. (Note: Cat Stevens had previously collaborated with Elton John on a 1970 demo titled "Honey Man" and would later share the stage with Neil Young during a 2025 Hyde Park show.)

The lyrics in "Home in the Sky" were inspired partially by the story of Benten, the Japanese goddess of art and music. In a 1974 interview, Stevens explained:

"I've realized that I can't have a dual relationship between my music and a lady that I love. I can't split myself like that, I brought them together in that song. There's a Japanese goddess called Benten and she's the goddess of music and art, and the idea is that if, in Japan, you have a good relationship with somebody she might get jealous and take away your artistic talent. That's a very simplified version of what happens with me. Art comes from yearning and if you're not yearning you're not creating."

A 50th-anniversary remaster and reissue was released on 4 September 2026.

== Track listing ==
All tracks composed by Cat Stevens

Side one

1. "Music" – 4:21
2. "Oh Very Young" – 2:36
3. "Sun / C79" – 4:35
4. "Ghost Town" – 3:10
5. "Jesus" – 2:14

Side two

1. "Ready" – 3:18
2. "King of Trees" – 5:07
3. "A Bad Penny" – 3:21
4. "Home in the Sky" – 3:38

== Personnel ==
- Cat Stevens – vocals, synthesizer, guitar, keyboards, production, design, concept, illustrations
- Alun Davies – acoustic guitar, vocals
- Bruce Lynch – bass guitar
- Jean Roussel – keyboards and string arrangements
- Gerry Conway – drums, vocals, percussion

=== Additional personnel ===
- Jimmy Ryan – guitar
- Mark Warner – guitar
- Roland Harker – banjo
- Joanne – vocals, choir
- Judy – vocals, choir
- Sunny – vocals, choir
- Ruby – vocals
- Barry – vocals
- Joy – vocals
- Brigette – vocals, choir
- Suzanne – vocals, solo
- Jacqui – vocals, choir
- Clifford – vocals, choir
- Danny – vocals
- Rick McCollum – vocals
- Jimmy – vocals, choir, chorus
- Larry – vocals
- Del Newman – string arrangements
- Suzanne Cox – vocals

=== Production ===
- Paul Samwell-Smith – producer
- John Wood – engineer
- Victor Gamm – engineer, mixing
- Alan Harris – mixing
- Ted Jensen – mastering
- Robin Black – mixing
- Roger Quested – mixing
- Beth Stempel – reissue co-ordination
- Bill Levenson – reissue supervisor
- Vartan – art direction
- Roland Young – design, concept
- Mathieu Bitton – package design, reissue package design

== Charts ==
=== Weekly charts ===
Weekly chart performance for Buddha and the Chocolate Box
Chart (1974)	Peak position
Australian Albums (Kent Music Report)	5
Austrian Albums (Ö3 Austria)	3
Canada Top Albums/CDs (RPM)	3
Finnish Albums (Suomen virallinen lista)	6
French Albums (SNEP)	9
German Albums (Offizielle Top 100)	34
Italian Albums (Musica e Dischi)	6
Norwegian Albums (VG-lista)	5
UK Albums (Official Charts)	3
US Billboard 200	2

=== Year-end charts ===
Year-end chart performance for Buddha and the Chocolate Box
Chart (1974)	Position
Australian Albums (Kent Music Report)	22
Canadian Albums (RPM)	32
French Albums (SNEP)	46
US Albums (Billboard)	32

== Certifications ==
Certifications for Buddha and the Chocolate Box
Region	Certification	Certified units/sales
United Kingdom (BPI)	Gold	100,000^{^}
United States (RIAA)	Platinum	1,000,000^{^}
^{^} Shipments figures based on certification alone.
