= Relax Your Mind =

Relax Your Mind may refer to:

- Relax Your Mind (album), an album by Jon Mark & Alun Davies (1963)
- Relax Your Mind, an album by Jim Kweskin (1966)
- Relax Your Mind, an album by Happy Traum (1975)
- "Relax Your Mind" (song), a song by Boyz II Men (2002)
