= Catch Bull at Four =

Studio album by Cat Stevens
- Released: 27 September 1972
- Recorded: May 1972
- Studios: The Manor Studio, Oxfordshire; Château d'Hérouville, Hérouville, France; Morgan Studios, London
- Genres: Folk rock, soft rock
- Length: 39:40
- Labels: Island (UK/Europe); A&M (US/Canada)
- Producer: Paul Samwell-Smith

Cat Stevens chronology
Very Young and Early Songs (1971)	Catch Bull at Four (1972)	Foreigner (1973)

Singles from Catch Bull at Four
- 1. "Sitting" Released: September 1972; 2. "Can't Keep It In" Released: September 1972

Professional ratings
Review scores
Source	Rating
Allmusic	3.5/5 stars
Christgau's Record Guide	C
Rolling Stone	(Favorable)

Catch Bull at Four is the sixth studio album by Cat Stevens. The title is taken from one of the Ten Bulls of Zen. In the United States the album spent three weeks at number one on the Billboard 200, the highest an album by Stevens has reached. It also reached number one in Australia and Canada and became Stevens's second consecutive album to reach number two on the UK Albums Chart. The song "Sitting" was released as a single in July 1972, reaching 16 on the Billboard Hot 100.

== Critical reception ==
Catch Bull at Four was well received both commercially and critically. Rolling Stone was satisfied with the "gorgeous melody and orchestration", while simultaneously disappointed by the lack of a single track comparable to "Morning Has Broken" from Teaser and the Firecat.

Record World described "Sitting" as a "magnificently produced up-tempo tune" that is "one of [Stevens'] best."

== Track listing ==
All songs written by Cat Stevens except as noted.

=== Side one ===
1. "Sitting" – 3:14
2. "Boy with a Moon & Star on His Head" – 5:57
3. "Angelsea" – 4:30
4. "Silent Sunlight" – 3:00
5. "Can't Keep It In" – 2:59

=== Side two ===
1. "18th Avenue (Kansas City Nightmare)" – 4:21
2. "Freezing Steel" – 3:40
3. "O Caritas" (Andreas Toumazis, Jeremy Taylor, Stevens) – 3:41
4. "Sweet Scarlet" – 3:49
5. "Ruins" – 4:24

== Personnel ==
- Cat Stevens – lead and backing vocals, Grand piano, Fender Rhodes electric piano, Wurlitzer electric piano, RMI Electra piano, Böhm Diamond organ, synthesizer, Spanish guitar, acoustic guitar, electric guitar, electric mandolin, pennywhistle, drums, percussion
- Alun Davies – acoustic guitar, Spanish guitar, backing vocals
- Jeremy Taylor – Spanish guitar, (assisted in translating "O' Caritas" into the Latin language used in the song).
- Andreas Toumazis – bouzouki on "O Caritas"
- Alan James – bass, backing vocals
- Jean Roussel – piano, Hammond organ, Electric piano
- Gerry Conway – drums, percussion, backing vocals
- C.S. Choir – backing vocals on "Freezing Steel" and "O Caritas"
- Linda Lewis – backing vocals on "Angelsea"
- Lauren Cooper – backing vocals on "Angelsea"
- Del Newman – string arrangements

Production

- Paul Samwell-Smith - producer

== Chart positions ==
=== Weekly charts ===
Weekly chart performance for Catch Bull at Four
Chart (1972)	Peak position
Australian Albums (Kent Music Report)	1
Canada Top Albums/CDs (RPM)	1
Dutch Albums (Album Top 100)	2
Finnish Albums (Suomen virallinen lista)	10
French Albums (SNEP)	4
Italian Albums (Musica e Dischi)	8
Norwegian Albums (VG-lista)	3
UK Albums (OCC)	2
US Billboard Top LPs	1
West German Media Control Albums Chart	17

=== Year-end charts ===
Year-end chart performance for Catch Bull at Four
Chart (1972)	Position
Australian Albums (ARIA, 1972)	12
French Albums (SNEP, 1972)	21
US Albums (Billboard, 1973)	14
West German Albums (Offizielle Top 100, 1973)	37

== Certifications ==
Certifications for Catch Bull at Four
Region	Certification
United States (RIAA)	Platinum
