= Banapple gas =

Banapple gas may refer to:

- an alternative name for amyl nitrite
- "Banapple Gas", a song on the 1975 Cat Stevens' album Numbers
