= Bruce Lynch =

New Zealand musician

- Born: 1 June 1948 (age 78)
- Origin: New Zealand
- Genres: Pop, rock
- Occupations: Musician producer arranger
- Instruments: Bass guitar Double bass Bass synthesizer
- Years active: 1970s–present

Bruce Lynch (born 1 June 1948, in New Zealand) is an electric and acoustic bassist, producer and arranger.

== Music career ==
Arriving in the UK in the mid-1970s, Lynch became a commercially successful session musician, touring extensively with Cat Stevens, including Stevens's 1976 Earth Tour as a sideman that was recorded as the album/DVD, Majikat, released in 2004; he appeared on six of Steven's albums. His wife Suzanne Lynch sang backing vocals for much of this time. He also recorded on two albums for Richard Thompson, and an album with Rick Wakeman as well as on Chris Rea's 1980 album Tennis and on Kate Bush's debut album. While in the UK, he was also an early member of British jazz fusion band Morrissey–Mullen, together with fellow New Zealand session musician Frank Gibson, Jr. on drums.

Returning to New Zealand in 1981, he started arranging and orchestrating for New Zealand television and jazz ensembles. He later became a record producer, producing, amongst others, Kiri te Kanawa's Maori Songs album, "(Glad I'm) Not a Kennedy" by Shona Laing, and receiving two New Zealand Music Awards: in 1981 as Producer of the Year for Dave McArtney and the Pink Flamingos, and in 1986 as Best Producer, for Peking Man.

On 18 September 2020 Yusuf/Cat Stevens released Tea for the Tillerman 2, a reimagining and re-recording of his 1970 album Tea for the Tillerman. Lynch played bass on the new recording,and discussed the background and details of how this happened with Jesse Mulligan on RNZ.

Bruce's son, Andy Lynch, is also a well known guitarist. He has played with Sting and was formerly the lead guitarist for the band, Zed. He currently plays with the New Zealand band, Atlas. He scored several Power Rangers series after the show's production moved to Auckland.

== Discography ==
=== With Cat Stevens ===
(All albums with Cat Stevens were released by Island/A&M unless otherwise noted

- Buddha and the Chocolate Box (1974)
- Saturnight (Live in Tokyo) (1974) Released only in Japan)
- Numbers (1975)
- Majikat – Earth Tour (1976) Eagle
- Izitso (1977)
- Back to Earth (1978)
- Tea for the Tillerman 2 (2020)
- King of a Land (2023)

== With others ==
- The Kick Inside (1978) – Kate Bush, EMI
- Rhapsodies (1979) – Rick Wakeman, A&M
- Tennis (1980) – Chris Rea, Magnet Records
- Across a Crowded Room (1985) – Richard Thompson, Polydor
- Watching the Dark – The History of Richard Thompson (1993) – Richard Thompson
- One Fine Day (2019) – Chris Rea
