= Rough Mix =

Studio album by Pete Townshend and Ronnie Lane
- Released: 16 September 1977
- Recorded: Winter 1976 and Spring 1977
- Studio: Olympic Studios (London)
- Genres: Rock; folk rock
- Length: 41:34
- Labels: MCA (US); Polydor (UK)
- Producer: Glyn Johns

Pete Townshend chronology
With Love (1976)	Rough Mix (1977)	Empty Glass (1980)

Ronnie Lane chronology
Mahoney's Last Stand (with Ron Wood) (1976)	Rough Mix (1977)	See Me (1979)

Rough Mix is a studio album by Pete Townshend, guitarist with the Who, and Ronnie Lane, former bassist with Small Faces and Faces. The album was released in September 1977 as Polydor 2442 in the UK and MCA 2295 in the US. It peaked at number 44 on the UK Albums Chart, and at number 45 on the US Billboard 200.

== Content ==
On 21 October 1976, the Who closed a brief North American tour in Toronto at Maple Leaf Gardens, a show that would be the last with Keith Moon before a paying audience. The Who then took a hiatus as band members pursued various individual interests.

Pete Townshend had been initially contacted by Ronnie Lane to produce his next album. The project instead turned into a full-blown collaboration between the pair. Lane expressed an interest in a songwriting collaboration but Townshend, who has very rarely co-written songs, was unwilling. The instrumental title track is credited to both musicians, however.

During the recording of Rough Mix, Lane's multiple sclerosis was diagnosed but still not revealed generally. In one instance, Lane had an emotional issue related to his MS that caused an argument between him and an unknowing Townshend. Nonetheless, Lane toured, wrote and recorded (with Eric Clapton among others) and in 1979 released another album, See Me, which features several songs written by Lane and Clapton. Around this time Lane travelled the highways and byways of England and lived a 'passing show' modern nomadic life in full Gypsy traveller costume and accommodation.

The album featured songs written by both principals in a vein less like that of the Who or Faces but instead close to the British folk rock vogue of the early 1970s among various English bands. The band on the track "Annie" comprised members of Lane's Slim Chance group, which played in that very style. A number of more famous colleagues also appeared on the recording, among them Who bassist John Entwistle, Ian Stewart and Charlie Watts from the Rolling Stones, and Eric Clapton. Orchestral arrangements for the track "Street in the City" were provided by Townshend's father-in-law, noted British film and television theme composer Edwin Astley.

Rough Mix was remastered in 2006 and released by Hip-O Records, the reissue label for the Universal Music Group, in both 5.1 surround sound format on Dualdisc and standard stereo compact disc. The reissue featured three outtakes as bonus tracks.

The cover art for the gatefold sleeve, by designer Peter Joyce, features "all sorts of British pop culture images from cricket to cars to show biz" in the form of a collage of trading cards. The font for the title references that used for Rizla cigarette papers.

== Critical reception ==
Professional ratings
Review scores
Source	Rating
AllMusic	4/5 stars
Christgau's Record Guide	A−
The Encyclopedia of Popular Music	4/5 stars
MusicHound Rock	3.5/5
The Rolling Stone Record Guide	5/5 stars
The Village Voice	B+

The Village Voice critic Robert Christgau wrote in his review of the album: "Meher Baba inspired psalmody so plain and sharply observed, maybe he was all reet after all. Three of Townshend's contributions—'Keep Me Turning,' 'Misunderstood,' and an unlikely song of adoration called 'My Baby Gives It Away'—are his keenest in years, and while Lane's evocations of the passing scene are more poignant on his Island import, One for the Road, 'Annie' is a suitably modest folk classic. Together, the two disciples prove that charity needn't be sentimental, detachment cold, nor peace boring. Selah."

== Track listing ==
Side one
No.	Title	Writer(s)	Length
1.	"My Baby Gives It Away"	Pete Townshend	4:02
2.	"Nowhere to Run"	Ronnie Lane	3:17
3.	"Rough Mix"	Townshend; Lane	3:12
4.	"Annie"	Lane; Kate Lambert; Eric Clapton	2:56
5.	"Keep Me Turning"	Townshend	3:46
6.	"Catmelody"	Lane; Lambert	3:12

Side two
No.	Title	Writer(s)	Length
1.	"Misunderstood"	Townshend	3:01
2.	"April Fool"	Lane	3:34
3.	"Street in the City"	Townshend	6:07
4.	"Heart to Hang Onto"	Townshend	4:29
5.	"'Til the Rivers All Run Dry"	Don Williams; Wayland Holyfield	3:54

2006 CD bonus tracks
No.	Title	Writer(s)	Length
12.	"Only You"	Lane	4:29
13.	"Good Question"	Townshend	3:34
14.	"Silly Little Man"	Lane	3:44

== Personnel ==
- Ronnie Lane and Pete Townshend – vocals, guitars, mandolins, bass guitars, banjos, ukuleles
- Charlie Hart – violin on "Annie"
- John Entwistle – horns on "Heart to Hang Onto"; vocal help on "Till the Rivers All Run Dry"
- Mel Collins – saxophones on "Catmelody"
- Peter Hope Evans – harmonica on "Nowhere to Run" and "Misunderstood"
- Benny Gallagher – accordion on "Annie"
- John "Rabbit" Bundrick – organ, Fender Rhodes on "Nowhere to Run", "Rough Mix", "Keep Me Turning" and "Heart to Hang Onto"
- Ian Stewart – piano on "Catmelody"
- Eric Clapton – electric guitar on "Rough Mix"; acoustic guitar on "Annie"; Dobro on "April Fool" and "Till the Rivers All Run Dry"
- Graham Lyle – twelve-string guitar on "Annie"
- Dave Markee – double bass on "Annie" and "April Fool"
- Boz Burrell – bass guitar on "Heart to Hang Onto" and "Till the Rivers All Run Dry"
- Henry Spinetti – drums on "Nowhere to Run", "Rough Mix", "Keep Me Turning", "Heart to Hang Onto" and "Till the Rivers All Run Dry"
- Charlie Watts – drums on "My Baby Gives It Away" and "Catmelody"
- Julian Diggle – percussion on "Misunderstood"
- Billy Nicholls – vocal help on "Till the Rivers All Run Dry"
- Edwin Astley – orchestrations on "Street in the City"
- Tony Gilbert – orchestral leader on "Street in the City"
- Charles Vorsanger – principal second violin on "Street in the City"
- Steve Shingles – principal viola on "Street in the City"
- Chris Green – principal cello on "Street in the City"
- Chris Laurence – principal bass on "Street in the City"

== Charts ==
Chart (1977)	Peak position
Canada Top Albums/CDs (RPM)	70
UK Albums (Official Charts)	44
US Billboard 200	45
