= I'm My Own Grandpa =

Song by Lonzo and Oscar
- Language: English
- Released: 1947
- Genre: Novelty
- Songwriters: Dwight Latham and Moe Jaffe

"I'm My Own Grandpa" (sometimes rendered as "I'm My Own Grandpaw") is a novelty song written by Dwight Latham and Moe Jaffe, performed by Lonzo and Oscar in 1947, about a man who, through an unlikely (but legal and non-incestuous) combination of marriages, becomes stepfather to his own stepmother. By dropping the "step-" modifiers, he becomes his own grandfather.

In the 1930s, Latham had a group, the Jesters, on network radio; their specialties were bits of spoken humor and novelty songs. While reading a book of Mark Twain anecdotes, he once found a paragraph in which Twain proved it would be possible for a man to become his own grandfather. ("Very Closely Related" appears on page 87 of Wit and Humor of the Age, which was co-authored by Mark Twain in 1883.) In 1947, Latham and Jaffe expanded the idea into a song, which became a hit for Lonzo and Oscar.

== Genealogy ==
Visualisation of the family tree in '"I'm My Own Grandpa", with 1 and 2 denoting the marriages and subsequent progeny

In the song, the narrator marries a widow with an adult daughter. Subsequently, his father marries the widow's daughter. This creates a comical tangle of relationships by a mixture of blood and marriage; for example, the narrator's father is now also his stepson-in-law.

The song then mentions that the narrator's wife and stepdaughter have children by the narrator and his father, respectively, which produces further amusing relationships. However, those children are irrelevant to the core concept of the narrator becoming "his own grandpa", since that occurs the moment the narrator and his father marry the mother-daughter pair:

- The narrator marries the older woman.
  - This results in the woman's daughter becoming his stepdaughter.
- Subsequently, the narrator's father marries the older woman's daughter.
  - The woman's daughter, being the new wife of the narrator's father, is now both the narrator's stepdaughter and his stepmother.
    - The narrator's wife, being the mother of his stepmother, is both the narrator's spouse and his step-grandmother.
      - The narrator, being the husband of his own step-grandmother (and stepfather of his own stepmother), has thus managed to become his own (step-step)grandfather.

The song continues with

- The narrator and his wife having a son.
  - The narrator's son is the half-brother of his stepdaughter, as the narrator's wife is the mother of both.
    - Since his stepdaughter is also his stepmother, then the narrator's son is also his own (step-half-)uncle because he is the (half-)brother of his (step-)mother.
      - The narrator's son is therefore a (half-)brother-in-law to the narrator's father, because the son is the (half-)brother of the father's wife.
- The narrator's father and his wife (the narrator's stepdaughter) then had a son of their own.
  - The child is the narrator's (step-) grandson because he is the son of his (step-)daughter.
    - The son is the (half-)brother of the narrator because they share a father.

== Real-life incidents ==
According to a 2007 article, the song was inspired by an anecdote that has been published periodically by newspapers for well over 150 years. The earliest citation was from the Republican Chronicle of Ithaca, New York on April 24, 1822, and that was copied from the London Literary Gazette:

A proof that a man may be his own Grandfather.—There was a widow and her daughter-in-law, and a man and his son. The widow married the son, and the daughter the old man; the widow was, therefore, mother to her husband's father, consequently grandmother to her own husband. They had a son, to whom she was great-grandmother; now, as the son of a great-grandmother must be either a grandfather or great-uncle, this boy was therefore his own grandfather. N. B. This was actually the case with a boy at a school in Norwich.

An 1884 book, The World of Wonders, attributed the original "remarkable genealogical curiosity" to Hood's Magazine.

In 1989, The Rolling Stones bassist Bill Wyman married Mandy Smith; she was 18 and he 52. In 1993, Wyman's 30-year-old son from his first marriage, Stephen, married Smith's mother, Patsy, who was then aged 46. However this was after Wyman and Smith had divorced. Wyman is therefore, arguably, the father-in-law of his ex-mother-in-law as well as the step-grandfather of his ex-wife.

== Cover versions ==
The cover version by Lonzo and Oscar was recorded in 1947, the same year that Latham and Jaffe released The Jesters original. A version by Guy Lombardo and The Guy Lombardo Trio became a hit in 1948. The song was also recorded by Phil Harris (as "He's His Own Grandpa"), Jo Stafford (as "I'm My Own Grandmaw"), singer/bandleader Tony Pastor, Kimball Coburn, Homer and Jethro, and "Jon & Alun" (Jon Mark and Alun Davies) on their record Relax Your Mind (1963).

“Uncle” Floyd Vivino recorded a cover in the mid-seventies on bioya records.

A 1976 episode of The Muppet Show includes a skit in which the song is performed by the all-Muppet Gogolala Jubilee Jugband. Ray Stevens recorded a version for his 1987 album Crackin' Up. In the movie The Stupids, Stanley Stupid, portrayed by Tom Arnold, sings "I'm My Own Grandpa" while on a talk show about strange families. Willie Nelson performed the song on his 2001 album The Rainbow Connection. This song was also performed by Grandpa Jones, who sang it both at the Grand Ole Opry and on the TV show Hee Haw. It was also later recorded on the album Home is Where the Heart Is by David Grisman and on Michael Cooney's album of songs for children. Folk singer Steve Goodman included it in his live shows, and recorded it on his album Somebody Else's Troubles.

Australian country musician Chad Morgan recorded a cover version in July 1981, which was released on Astor Records. Morgan also frequently performed the song live in concerts. In 1982, German country band Truck Stop published a German-language version titled "Mein Opa, das bin ich". In 1984, Norwegian folk singer Øystein Sunde published a Norwegian-language version titled "Jeg er min egen bestefar". Northern Irish comedic folk singer Anthony John Clarke frequently covers the song in his gigs and recorded it on his 2004 album Just Bring Yourself.

== In popular fiction ==
Robert Heinlein's time travel short story '—All You Zombies—' (1958) was inspired by the song.

== Logic and reasoning ==
Professor Philip Johnson-Laird used the song to illustrate issues in formal logic as contrasted with psychology of reasoning, noting that the transitive property of identity relationships expressed in natural language was highly sensitive to variations in grammar, while reasoning by models, such as the one constructed in the song, avoided this sensitivity.

The situation is included in a set of problems attributed to Alcuin of York, and also in the final story in Baital Pachisi; the question asks to describe the relationship of the children to each other. Alcuin's solution is that the children are simultaneously uncle and nephew to each other; he does not draw attention to the relationships of the other characters.
