= Ronnie Lane's Mobile Studio =

Mobile recording service started by British rock musician Ronnie Lane

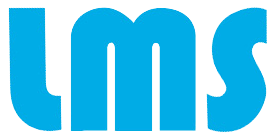
- Founder: Ronnie Lane
- Headquarters: London, England
- Website: www.lmsmobilestudio.com

Ronnie Lane's Mobile Studio, also known as LMS (Lane Mobile Studio), is a mobile recording studio originally owned by Ronnie Lane.

== History ==
Lane acquired the studio in 1972. It was one of the first ever mobile recording studios, and consisted of a 16-track studio housed in a 26' Airstream trailer, with a Helios mixing console, Studer and Revox multitrack tape recorders, and Tannoy monitor speakers. The studio was built by audio engineer Ron Nevison.

After he left The Faces in 1973, Lane based the studio on his farm, Fishpool, in the hamlet of Hyssington, near Churchstoke, in Powys, Wales. There he used the studio to record his first solo album Anymore for Anymore (1974). He also used the studio to record One for the Road (1976), and an image of the mobile recording studio is featured on the album cover.

Sold in 1982, it has been used exclusively with private clients since then. The studio underwent a major overhaul in 2009, with the owners launching a vinyl label called LMS Vinyl.

== Albums recorded with LMS ==
In addition to using the studio himself, Lane leased it to numerous other artists for their own recordings, including:

- Eric Clapton: Rainbow Concert (1973)
- Reading Festival (Various - Staus Quo, Faces, Rory Gallagher): Reading Festival '73
- Rory Gallagher: Irish Tour '74 (1974)
- The Who: Quadrophenia (1973) and The Who By Numbers (1975)
- Rick Wakeman: Journey to the Centre of the Earth (live) (1974) and Lisztomania (1975)
- Bad Company: Bad Company (1974) and Straight Shooter (1975)
- Peter Frampton: Frampton (1974)
- Billy Nicholls: Love Songs (1974)
- Chilli Willi and the Red Hot Peppers: Bongos Over Balham (1974)
- Monty Python – Monty Python Live At Drury Lane (1974)
- Mott: Drive On (1975)
- Andy Fraser Band: In Your Eyes (1975)
- Led Zeppelin: Physical Graffiti (1975)
- Ronnie Lane – Ronnie Lane's Slim Chance (1975)
- Barry Humphries: Dame Edna Everage: Housewife Superstar (1976)
- Paul Kossoff – Koss (1977)
- Buckacre – Morning Comes (1976)
- Hawklords: 25 Years On (1978)
- Dogwatch – Penfriend (1979)
- Eric Burdon: Darkness Darkness (1980)
- The Jackie Lynton Band: The Jackie Lynton Band (1980)
- Peyote: Quite Like It (2012)

It was also used to record a new one-ton bell in a bell foundry for AC/DC's song "Hells Bells" (1980).

It was also used by Sandy Denny in 1973 at a club called The Howff, in London’s Primrose Hill although the tapes have been lost.
