= Ruby Love =

- French single

Single by Cat Stevens

from the album Teaser and the Firecat
- B-side: "Miles from Nowhere" (France/Greece); "Longer Boats" (Germany, Spain, Benelux)
- Released: 1971
- Genre: Soft rock, folk
- Length: 2:35
- Label: Island (UK/Europe); A&M (US/Canada)
- Songwriter: Cat Stevens
- Producer: Paul Samwell-Smith

Cat Stevens singles chronology
"Peace Train" (1971)	"Ruby Love" (1971)	"Morning Has Broken" (1972)

"Ruby Love", titled "Rubylove" on album pressings, is a song written and recorded by English singer-songwriter Cat Stevens. It was released as a 1971 single for his 1971 album Teaser and the Firecat.

Initially, Stevens had titled the song "Who'll Be My Love", later renaming it to "Ruby Love" after the daughter of Stevens's guitarist mispronounced it.

The song incorporates a verse sung solely in Greek and utilizes bouzoukis in the instrumentation to give the song a Mediterranean feel. Stevens himself enjoyed the song, citing Greek music as his "most important influence", and commenting that the song "really turns me on".

In a review for Rolling Stone, Tim Crouse labeled the song's tune as "pleasant enough", but added that "it’s the novelty of those two Zorbas on the bouzoukis that makes the song."

The single did not chart upon release.
