= Tea for the Tillerman 2 =

2020 studio album by Yusuf / Cat Stevens

Studio album by Yusuf / Cat Stevens
- Released: 18 September 2020
- Recorded: July 2019
- Studios: Les Studios de la Fabrique, France
- Genre: Folk rock
- Length: 39:20
- Labels: Cat-O-Log; Island
- Producers: Yusuf / Cat Stevens & Paul Samwell-Smith

Yusuf / Cat Stevens chronology
The Laughing Apple (2017)	Tea for the Tillerman 2 (2020)	King of a Land (2023)

Singles from Tea for the Tillerman
- 1. "Where Do the Children Play?" Released: 28 May 2020; 2. "On the Road to Find Out" Released: 13 August 2020; 3. "Father and Son" Released: 10 September 2020

Professional ratings
Review scores
Source	Rating
AllMusic	3/5 stars
Rolling Stone	4/5 stars
The Times	4/5 stars

Tea for the Tillerman 2 (stylised as Tea for the Tillerman²) is the sixteenth studio album by singer-songwriter Yusuf / Cat Stevens, released on 18 September 2020 by Cat-O-Log Records through Island. It is a re-imagining of his hit 1970 album Tea for the Tillerman.

== Track listing ==
All tracks are written by Yusuf / Cat Stevens.

Side one
No.	Title	Length
1.	"Where Do the Children Play?"	4:09
2.	"Hard Headed Woman"	3:32
3.	"Wild World"	3:47
4.	"Sad Lisa"	3:58
5.	"Miles from Nowhere"	4:02

Side two
No.	Title	Length
1.	"But I Might Die Tonight"	3:13
2.	"Longer Boats"	2:30
3.	"Into White"	3:43
4.	"On the Road to Find Out"	5:48
5.	"Father and Son"	3:50
6.	"Tea for the Tillerman"	1:00

== Personnel ==
- Yusuf / Cat Stevens – Spanish guitar, acoustic guitar, electric guitar, 12-string guitar, grand piano, keyboards, harpsichord, lead vocals
- Alun Davies – acoustic guitar, backing vocals, vocals on "Father and Son"
- Jim Cregan – acoustic guitar, electric guitar, backing vocals
- Eric Appapoulay – acoustic guitar, electric guitar, Spanish guitar, backing vocals
- Bruce Lynch – double bass, electric bass
- Martin Allcock - bass on (3), piano (3)
- Peter-John Vettese – keyboards, organ, synth horns, backing vocals, string arrangements
- Andreas Andersson - clarinet on "Wild World"
- Kwame Yeboah– drums, percussion, keyboards, backing vocals
- John Ashton Thomas – string arrangements on (1, 2, 4, 6, 10)
- Christopher Nightingale – arrangements
- Brother Ali – rap on "Longer Boats"
- Voxaphonic - backing vocals on (1, 3, 10)

== Charts ==
Chart performance for Tea for the Tillerman 2
Chart (2020)	Peak position
Australian Albums (ARIA)	50
Belgian Albums (Ultratop Flanders)	183
Belgian Albums (Ultratop Wallonia)	96
French Albums (SNEP)	161
Irish Albums (Official Charts)	45
Italian Albums (FIMI)	78
Portuguese Albums (AFP)	19
UK Albums (Official Charts)	4
