= Majik Mijits =

The Legendary Majik Mijits

Studio album by Majik Mijits
- Released: 2000
- Recorded: 1981
- Genres: Rock, rhythm and blues, mod
- Length: 33:34
- Label: NMC
- Producers: Steve Marriott, Ronnie Lane

Steve Marriott chronology
Go for the Throat (1981)	The Legendary Majik Mijits (1981)	Packet of Three (1984)

Ronnie Lane chronology
See Me (1979)	Majik Mijits (1981)

Professional ratings
Review scores
Source	Rating
AllMusic	3/5 stars

The Legendary Majik Mijits is an album by former Small Faces members Steve Marriott and Ronnie Lane. It was recorded when they reformed under the name of Majik Mijits in 1981 and gave a one-off concert at the Bridgehouse pub in East London. The lineup included Jim Leverton, Mick Green, Mick Weaver, Dave Hynes and Sam Brown.

== Track listing ==
No.	Title	Writer(s)	Length
1.	"Lonely No More"	Steve Marriott	2:18
2.	"Chicken (If the Cap Fits)"	Ronnie Lane	3:51
3.	"Toe Rag"	Steve Marriott	1:09
4.	"Bombers Moon"	Ronnie Lane	3:07
5.	"Birthday Girl"	Steve Marriott	2:52
6.	"Last Tango in Nato"	Ronnie Lane	3:16
7.	"How Does It Feel"	Steve Marriott	2:43
8.	"That's the Way It Goes"	Ronnie Lane	2:45
9.	"You Spent It"	Steve Marriott, Jim Leverton	3:34
10.	"Son of Stanley Lane"	Ronnie Lane	2:13
11.	"Be the One"	Steve Marriott, Jim Leverton	2:29
12.	"Ruby Jack"	Ronnie Lane	3:35
13.	"All or Nothing" (Live)	Steve Marriott, Ronnie Lane

== Personnel ==
- Steve Marriott – guitar, vocals
- Ronnie Lane – bass guitar, vocals
- Mick Green – guitar
- Mick Weaver – keyboards
- Jim Leverton – bass guitar
- Dave Hynes – drums
- Sam Brown – backing vocals
