= Two Fine People =

- German single sleeve

Single by Cat Stevens

from the album Greatest Hits
- B-side: "A Bad Penny"
- Released: June 1975
- Genre: Folk rock, soft rock
- Length: 3:32
- Label: Island (UK/Europe); A&M (US/Canada)
- Songwriter: Cat Stevens
- Producer: Cat Stevens

Cat Stevens singles chronology
"Ready" (1974)	"Two Fine People" (1975)	"Banapple Gas" (1976)

"Two Fine People" is a song written and recorded by English singer-songwriter Cat Stevens in 1975. It was released as a single in June 1975 to promote Stevens's Greatest Hits compilation. The song peaked at no. 33 on the US Billboard Hot 100, but didn't chart in the UK. The lyrics are about undying devotion in a relationship between "two fine people".

== Background ==
"Two Fine People" was excluded from Stevens's upcoming album Numbers, and instead was released "as a teaser" for his 1975 Greatest Hits album. The compilation reached no. 2 and no. 6 on the UK and US charts, respectively, and gained 4x Platinum status in the US.

However, the song failed to chart in the UK. When Stevens introduced it at a London concert, he called it "one of my greatest flops".

The song sounds similar to Stevens's 1971 hit "Wild World". At a concert for his Majikat tour in 1976, Stevens joked that he "stole it" from "Wild World".

== Charts ==
Chart (1975)	Peak position
Australia (Kent Music Report)	76
Canada RPM Top Singles	34
US Billboard Hot 100	33
US Billboard Easy Listening	39
