= Mahoney's Last Stand =

Soundtrack album by Ron Wood and Ronnie Lane
- Released: September 1976
- Recorded: May, September–November 1972, March 1976
- Studio: Olympic Sound Studios, London
- Genre: Rock
- Label: Atlantic
- Producer: Glyn Johns

Ron Wood chronology
Now Look (1975)	Mahoney's Last Stand (1976)	Gimme Some Neck (1979)

Ronnie Lane chronology
One for the Road (1976)	Mahoney's Last Stand (1976)	Rough Mix (1977)

Mahoney's Last Stand is an album by Faces bandmates Ronnie Wood and Ronnie Lane, recorded in 1972 (with sessions overlapping with the early rehearsals for the Faces' final studio album Ooh La La). It is the music soundtrack album of the low-budget 1972 Canadian film Mahoney's Last Stand (original US title: Mahoney's Estate) starring Alexis Kanner (who also produced the film), Sam Waterston and Maud Adams. The film itself, little seen at the time of its release and even less so since, charts the progress of city-dweller Mahoney (Kanner) who abandons his urban existence to become a homesteader, and the drama that ensues. Pete Townshend, who guests on guitar on some tracks on the album, also receives a credit in the film for providing 'special electronic effects', alongside Wood and Lane's musical score.

For various reasons, the film's release was delayed until 1976, and consequently the soundtrack album suffered the same fate (and to further confuse matters the film has since also been re-released under the title Downtown Farmer). However, due to the relative fame of Wood (and to a lesser extent, Lane), the soundtrack album has remained far more readily available than the film itself.

== Background ==
Ronnie Lane was initially approached to produce a soundtrack for the film through his acquaintance with lead actor and producer Alexis Kanner, and Lane, at a loose end between Faces recording commitments, soon involved his bandmate Ronnie Wood. Lane and Wood were already an established songwriting team within the Faces (and would soon go on to write one of the group's best-remembered numbers, "Ooh La La", together), although by 1972 their partnership had begun to take a back seat to Wood's more commercially-driven writing alliance with Rod Stewart. The Mahoney soundtrack album is a mostly laid-back affair, strongly influenced by folk and country styles in line with the bulk of Ronnie Lane's later solo work, and in keeping with the themes of the film itself. Half of the tracks are instrumentals, but one of the others, "Mona (The Blues)", is a re-arrangement of an instrumental Faces outtake from 1970 with a new lead vocal by Wood. Another vocal number, "Just For a Moment", is one of Lane's most tender ballads, recently rehearsed with the Faces but set aside for this project.

For such a seemingly small-scale project, the album attracted an all-star guest cast of 1970s musicians (see below), and fellow Faces Ian McLagan and Kenney Jones also guest on "Tonight's Number", one of the more uptempo rock-oriented tracks. In some ways the album offered a tantalising glimpse of the musical direction the originally intended Faces lineup might have taken under Lane and Wood's leadership without Rod Stewart in the group, while also demonstrating how crucial Stewart was to their commercial - if not necessarily artistic - success (Stewart was the last member to join the band in mid-1969 despite the misgivings of Lane and Ian McLagan, who were still smarting after being summarily abandoned by their previous lead singer Steve Marriott only a few months earlier, in their previous formation as Small Faces).

Although it was recorded in 1972, the album remained unfinished and unreleased until 1976, by which time the Faces were defunct, Lane had established a modest but creatively fulfilling solo career, and Wood had joined the Rolling Stones. The album was released to little fanfare, and the lack of information on the original release initially led fans (and reviewers) to believe the work was a reunion for the two bandmates rather than an extracurricular project recorded while Lane was still an active member of the Faces (he left the group in 1973, and they dissolved in 1975). This false assumption remained uncorrected until the album was reissued on CD nearly thirty years later with new, more detailed recording notes (although even today some reviewers seemingly still remain ignorant of the facts).

Professional ratings
Review scores
Source	Rating
AllMusic	3.5/5 stars
Christgau's Record Guide	B−
MusicHound Rock	2/5
The Rolling Stone Album Guide	3/5 stars

== Track listing ==
All tracks composed by Ron Wood and Ronnie Lane.

1. "Tonight's Number"
2. "From the Late to the Early"
3. "Chicken Wire"
4. "Chicken Wired"
5. "I'll Fly Away" (Traditional; arranged by Wood and Lane)
6. "Title One"
7. "Just for a Moment" (Instrumental)
8. " "Mona" the Blues"
9. "Car Radio"
10. "Hay Tumble"
11. "Woody's Thing"
12. "Rooster Funeral"
13. "Just for a Moment"

== Personnel ==
- Ron Wood – vocals, guitar, bass, harmonica
- Ronnie Lane – vocals, guitar, bass, banjo, percussion
- Pete Townshend – guitar on "Tonight's Number", percussion on "Car Radio"
- Ric Grech – bass on "Chicken Wire", drums on ""Mona" the Blues", violin on "Rooster Funeral"
- Benny Gallagher – bass on "From the Late to the Early"
- Ian McLagan – piano, harmonium, keyboards on "Tonight's Number", "Car Radio" and "Chicken Wire/d"
- Ian Stewart – piano on "Woody's Thing"
- Bobby Keys – saxophone on "Tonight's Number", "Title One" and "Car Radio"
- Jim Price – trumpet on "Tonight's Number" and "Title One
- Kenney Jones – drums on "Tonight's Number"
- Bruce Rowland – drums
- Micky Waller – percussion on "Hay Tumble""
- The Wood/Lane Vocal Ensemble (Billy Nicholls, Bruce Rowland, Glyn Johns, Ron Wood and Ronnie Lane) – vocals on "I'll Fly Away"
