= Numbers (Cat Stevens album) =

Numbers: A Pythagorean Theory Tale

Studio album by Cat Stevens
- Released: 30 November 1975
- Recorded: October 1975
- Studios: Le Studio (Morin Heights, Canada)
- Genres: Soft rock, folk rock
- Length: 33:38
- Labels: Island (UK/Europe); A&M (US/Canada)
- Producer: Cat Stevens

Cat Stevens chronology
Greatest Hits (1975)	Numbers: A Pythagorean Theory Tale (1975)	Izitso (1977)

Singles from Numbers
- 1. "Banapple Gas" Released: March 1976

Professional ratings
Review scores
Source	Rating
Allmusic	2/5 stars

Numbers is the ninth studio album, and the first concept album by singer/songwriter Cat Stevens released in November 1975. It was not well received by fans nor critics, who were left confused by the concept and disappointed by the music. The album did not chart in the UK. Its sole single, "Banapple Gas", was released in mid-1976, reaching no. 41 on the US Billboard Hot 100.

== Background and concept ==
The idea for Numbers, subtitled "A Pythagorean Theory Tale," came from the teachings of Pythagoras, which were revealed to Stevens by a woman named Hestia Lovejoy. The album is dedicated to her.

Stevens spent three months in Brazil writing Numbers, then searched for writers, who he found in Chris Bryant and Allan Scott. The story was mostly finished by mid-1975, which was when Stevens flew to Paris to begin drawing. He studied Disney's work and borrowed his use of shadows, and a month later returned to the United States with 50 pen-and-ink illustrations in hand. The full book was trimmed to excerpts, which were included in the album's booklet.

The concept was a fantastic spiritual musical which is set on the fictional planet Polygor. In the story there is a castle with a number machine, which exists to fulfill the sole purpose of the planet – dispersing numbers to the rest of the universe: 1, 2, 3, 4, 5, 6, 7, 8, and 9 (but notably not 0). The nine inhabitants of Polygor, the Polygons, are Monad, Dupey, Trezlar, Cubis, Qizlo, Hexidor, Septo, Octav, and Novim. As the first lines of the book say, they "followed a life of routine that had existed for as long as any could remember. ... It was, therefore, all the more shocking when on an ordinary day things first started to go wrong." The change takes the form of Jzero, who comes from nowhere as a slave and eventually confuses everybody with his simple truth.

== Release and reception ==
Upon its initial release in late 1975 both fans and critics were confused by the concept and the lack of the sort of 'catchy' music that they had been used to from Stevens, and although the album eventually achieved gold status, it sold far less than his previous four albums and was considered a critical failure. Numbers did not chart in the UK.

In a 1976 review for Rolling Stone, Paul Nelson described the album as "Stevens minus the common sense and considerable technical skills of his regular producer, Paul Samwell-Smith" and "breathtakingly stupid."

William Ruhlmann of AllMusic said listening to the album was "like hearing a Broadway cast album without having seen the show- something seemed to be going on, but it was hard to tell what."

As a result of its poor performance, by the late 1980s, Numbers was the only album of Stevens's catalog not issued on CD. It finally received its first CD issue in 1994, as a limited edition along with the albums Izitso and Back to Earth in a box set called Three from the Mobile Fidelity Sound Lab label. This box is no longer available and is thus highly prized among collectors.

Stevens's next album, Izitso, was more successful and reached no. 7 on the US Billboard 200, with its lead single reaching no. 33 on the US Billboard Hot 100.

== Track listing ==
All the tracks were written by Cat Stevens. The original LP broke with tradition and called the second side "Side 0", a reference to Jzero.

=== Side 1 ===
1. "Whistlestar" (instrumental) – 3:46
2. "Novim's Nightmare" – 3:50
3. "Majik of Majiks" – 4:30
4. "Drywood" – 4:53

=== Side 0 (2) ===
1. "Banapple Gas" – 3:07
2. "Land o' Freelove & Goodbye" – 2:50
3. "Jzero" – 3:44
4. "Home" – 4:09
5. "Monad's Anthem" – 2:43

== Personnel ==
- Cat Stevens – acoustic guitar, electric guitar, twelve string guitar, piano, Fender Rhodes electric piano, ARP 2600, ARP 2500, vocals
- Jean Roussel – piano, Yamaha organ, Wurlitzer electric piano, synthesizer, harpsichord, Hammond organ, string synthesizer, vocals, vibraphone
- Alun Davies – acoustic guitar, 12-string acoustic guitar, vocals
- Gerry Conway – drums, vocals
- Bruce Lynch – bass, double bass

=== Additional personnel ===
- Simon Nicol – acoustic guitar, electric guitar, 12-string electric guitar
- Chico Batera – congas, wind chimes, ganza, triangle, waterphone
- Gordie Fleming – accordion
- David Sanborn – alto saxophone
- Magic Children of Ottawa – vocals
- Barbara Massey – vocals
- Carl Hall – vocals
- Tasha Thomas – vocals
- Art Garfunkel – vocals
- Lewis Furey – vocals
- Melba Joyce – vocals
- Carmen Twillie – vocals
- Brenda Russell – vocals
- Vennette Gloud – vocals
- Suzanne Lynch – vocals
- Anna Peacock – vocals
- Vincent Beck – vocals

== Charts ==
=== Weekly charts ===
Chart (1975–1976)	Peak position
Australian Albums (Kent Music Report)	85
Canada Top Albums/CDs (RPM)	4
Dutch Albums (Album Top 100)	18
German Albums (Offizielle Top 100)	20
Norwegian Albums (VG-lista)	14
Spanish Albums (Promusicae)	12
Swedish Albums (Sverigetopplistan)	9
US Billboard 200	13

=== Year-end charts ===
Chart (1976)	Position
German Albums (Offizielle Top 100)	20

== Certifications and sales ==
Region	Certification	Certified units/sales
Canada (Music Canada)	Gold	50,000^{^}
United States (RIAA)	Gold	500,000^{^}
^{^} Shipments figures based on certification alone.
