= Ronnie Lane's Slim Chance =

Studio album by Ronnie Lane
- Released: February 1975
- Recorded: 1974
- Studio: Ronnie Lane's Mobile Studio
- Genre: Folk rock
- Length: 44:59
- Label: Island; A&M (US)
- Producer: Ronnie Lane

Ronnie Lane chronology
Anymore for Anymore (1974)	Ronnie Lane's Slim Chance (1975)	One for the Road (1976)

Professional ratings
Review scores
Source	Rating
AllMusic	4.5/5 stars
Christgau's Record Guide	B+
Mojo	4/5 stars
MusicHound Rock	2.5/5 stars
The Rolling Stone Album Guide	4/5 stars

Ronnie Lane's Slim Chance is the second solo album recorded by Ronnie Lane, one of the founders of Small Faces and Faces, after he left Faces to live on a farm in Wales. In homage to his perceived chances of commercial success, he named his band Slim Chance. Six of the thirteen songs on this album were originals written by Lane, the rest of Slim Chance, and Lane's wife, Kate Lambert; the remainder were covers, including a new version of the Faces track "Stone".

The American release of the album had an altered tracklist, with "The Poacher" and a cover of "Brother, Can You Spare a Dime?" being added in place of "I'm Just a Country Boy" and "Single Saddle".

== UK track listing ==
1. "Little Piece of Nothing" (Ronnie Lane) – 2:23
2. "Stone" (Lane) – 4:06
3. "Bottle of Brandy" (Joe Isaacs) – 2:46
4. "Street Gang" (Lane, Ruan O'Lochlainn, Steve Simpson) – 4:04
5. "Anniversary" (Lane) – 2:57
6. "I'm Gonna Sit Right Down (and Write Myself a Letter)" (music: Fred Ahlert; lyrics: Joe Young) – 2:53
7. "I'm Just a Country Boy" (Fred Brooks, Marshall Barer) – 2:42
8. "Ain't No Lady" (Lane, Ruan O'Lochlainn, Kate Lambert) – 4:22
9. "Blue Monday" (Fats Domino, Dave Bartholomew) – 4:07
10. "Give Me a Penny" (Lane) – 2:57
11. "You Never Can Tell" (Chuck Berry) – 4:31
12. "Tin and Tambourine" (Lane, Kate Lambert) – 4:09
13. "Single Saddle" (Arthur Altman, Hal David) – 3:02

== US track listing ==
1. "The Poacher" (Lane) – 3:40
2. "Stone" (Lane) – 4:06
3. "Bottle of Brandy" (Isaacs) – 2:46
4. "Street Gang" (Lane, O'Lochlainn, Simpson) – 4:04
5. "Anniversary" (Lane) – 2:57
6. "I'm Gonna Sit Right Down (and Write Myself a Letter)" (Ahlert, Young) – 2:53
7. "Little Piece of Nothing" (Lane) – 2:23
8. "Brother, Can You Spare a Dime?" (Yip Harburg, Jay Gorney) – 2:06
9. "Ain't No Lady" (Lane, O'Lochlainn, Lambert) – 4:22
10. "Blue Monday" (Domino, Bartholomew) – 4:07
11. "Give Me a Penny" (Lane) – 2:57
12. "You Never Can Tell" (Berry) – 4:31
13. "Tin and Tambourine" (Lane, Kate Lambert) – 4:09

== Personnel ==
All track positions from the UK listing.

- Ronnie Lane – vocals, electric and acoustic guitars

Slim Chance

- Steve Simpson – electric and acoustic guitars, mandolin, violin, harmonica
- Ruan O'Lochlainn – piano, organ, soprano, alto and tenor saxophones
- Charlie Hart – piano, organ, accordion, violin
- Brian Belshaw – bass
- Glen LeFleur – drums, percussion (tracks 1–4, 6–9, 11, 13)

Session drummer

- Jim Frank – drums (tracks 5, 10, 12)

Production

- Producer: Ronnie Lane
- Recording engineer: John Burns, Ron Fawcus
- Artistic design: Ruan O'Lochlainn
- Photography: Ruan O'Lochlainn
- Liner notes: Sid Griffin
