= The Hurt =

- Spanish/Portuguese single sleeve

Single by Cat Stevens

from the album Foreigner
- B-side: "Silent Sunlight"
- Released: June 1973
- Recorded: Spring 1973
- Studio: Dynamic Studios, Kingston, Jamaica; Atlantic Studios, New York
- Genre: Folk rock, soul, R&B
- Length: 4:17
- Label: Island (UK/Europe); A&M (US/Canada)
- Songwriter: Cat Stevens
- Producer: Cat Stevens

Cat Stevens singles chronology
"Can't Keep It In" (1972)	"The Hurt" (1973)	"Oh Very Young" (1974)

"The Hurt" is a song written and recorded by English singer-songwriter Cat Stevens in spring 1973, released on his album Foreigner. It was released as a single in June 1973, and peaked at no. 31 on the US Billboard Hot 100.

== Background ==
uDiscover Music's Jamie Atkins characterized "The Hurt" as "[advocating] for experiencing pain to truly appreciate life, set to a slinky groove." Steve Gaines of Circus Magazine felt Stevens's near-death experience with tuberculosis was an influence on the track. He identified the song as summarizing "[Stevens's] feelings about death and a constant search for happiness."

Stevens stated: "There’s no way you can go through life without getting hurt. I realize I’m heading straight for death with no detour, and I want the moment of my death to be as free as possible."

Stevens has since described the song's sound as having "a soulful kind of root to it". He recorded the vocal backings at Atlantic Studios in New York, inspired by his fondness of the studio.

== Release and reception ==
The song was released as the sole single from Stevens's 1973 album Foreigner. Stevens chose it, feeling it was the "only single-sounding thing on the Foreigner album".

In a review for AllMusic, William Ruhlmann called the songwriting and arrangement of "The Hurt" "overly busy". Stephen Holden of Rolling Stone was critical of the song, labeling it as Stevens "deliberately renouncing the sentiments of his past work," adding "there is no way of telling (and then again, who cares?), since the lyrics digress completely, to end with the following confession: 'Till I got hurt, baby, I didn’t know what love is.'"

== Charts ==
Chart (1973)	Peak position
Australia (Kent Music Report)	30
Canada RPM Top Singles	25
Spain	17
US Billboard Hot 100	31
US Billboard Easy Listening	38
