= Sitting (song) =

- Portuguese single sleeve

Single by Cat Stevens

from the album Catch Bull at Four
- B-side: "Crab Dance"
- Released: September 1972
- Recorded: May 1972
- Studio: The Manor Studio, Oxfordshire
- Genre: Folk rock, soft rock
- Length: 3:14
- Label: Island (UK/Europe); A&M (US/Canada)
- Songwriter: Cat Stevens
- Producer: Paul Samwell-Smith

Cat Stevens singles chronology
"The First Cut Is the Deepest" (1972)	"Sitting" (1972)	"Can't Keep It In" (1972)

"Sitting" is a song written and recorded by English singer-songwriter Cat Stevens in May 1972, released on his album Catch Bull at Four. It was released as a single in September 1972, peaking at no. 16 on the US Billboard Hot 100. "Sitting" was written about meditation.

== Background ==
In retrospect, Stevens described the song's lyrics as some of his most profound work, noting that "it tells the story of my [spiritual] search". He added that it "conveys an awareness of my audience".

== Release and reception ==
"Sitting" was released in September 1972 with instrumental B-side "Crab Dance". According to guitarist Alun Davies, "Crab Dance" was based on Stevens's "dressing room tune up". He explained: "Without the aid of a guitar tuner, you sort of strike from the fifth fret and tune up right through there. He actually wrote the song based on that."

Record World characterized "Sitting" as a "magnificently produced up-tempo tune", calling it "one of [Stevens's] best."

Circus Magazine identified the song as a "frenzied near-rocker", which "hint that Steve has grown more frustrated, yet more determined". In a later issue, it mentioned "Sitting", alongside "Can't Keep It In", as heralding "a far more emotional presentation, a new lyrical sophistication, and a greater complexity of musical form."

== Charts ==
Chart (1972)	Peak position
Australia (Kent Music Report)	34
Canada RPM Top Singles	14
New Zealand (Listener)	4
US Billboard Hot 100	16
US Billboard Easy Listening	17
