= Moonshadow (song) =

- US single cover (A&M 1265-S)

Single by Cat Stevens

from the album Teaser and the Firecat
- B-side: "Father and Son" (UK); "I Think I See the Light" (US/Canada)
- Released: September 1970
- Recorded: July 1970
- Studio: Morgan Studios, Willesden, London
- Genre: Folk
- Length: 2:52
- Label: Island (UK/Europe); A&M (US/Canada)
- Songwriter: Cat Stevens
- Producer: Paul Samwell-Smith

Cat Stevens singles chronology
| "Wild World" (1970) | "Moonshadow" (1970) | "Peace Train" (1971) |

Music video
- "Moonshadow" on YouTube

"Moonshadow" is a song written and performed by English musician Cat Stevens, first released as a single in the UK in 1970 on the Island label and in the US in June 1971 on the A&M label. It also appears on Stevens's 1971 album Teaser and the Firecat.

== History ==
Stevens considers this his favourite of his old songs. When Yusuf appeared on The Chris Isaak Hour in 2009, he said of this song:

"I was on a holiday in Spain. I was a kid from the West End [of London] – bright lights, et cetera. I never got to see the moon on its own in the dark, there were always streetlamps. So there I was on the edge of the water on a beautiful night with the moon glowing, and suddenly I looked down and saw my shadow. I thought that was so cool, I'd never seen it before."

Cash Box said that this "softly tailored folderol from Cat Stevens shows his whimsical side." Billboard called it a "super rhythm ballad." Record World called it an "interesting song."

An animated short featuring the song was part of the Fantastic Animation Festival feature film released in 1977. The animation begins with a still frame of Teaser and his pet Firecat, pictured as they appear on the cover of the album bearing their names. The picture comes to life, and in the course of the animation, they find the fallen Moon, ride on it as it flies, and find a way to replace it in the sky. The beginning and ending story portions were written by Cat Stevens and narrated by Spike Milligan. The video also appears as a special feature on the Majikat DVD.

In May 2012, Moonshadow, a new musical by Yusuf, featuring music from throughout his career, opened at the Princess Theatre in Melbourne, Australia. The show received mixed reviews and closed four weeks early.

The song appears as "Moon Shadow" on both the UK and US labels of the single release.

== Chart history ==
| Chart (1971) | Peak position |
|---|---|
| UK Singles (The Official Charts Company) | 22 |
| US Billboard Easy Listening | 10 |
| US Billboard Hot 100 | 30 |
| Canada RPM | 26 |
| Canada RPM AC | 20 |

== Notable cover versions ==
- A version by Liz And the Kids reached #28 in the Canadian AC charts on 29 July 1972.
