= See Me (Ronnie Lane album) =

Studio album by Ronnie Lane
- Released: 1979
- Genres: Rock; rock & roll
- Length: 41:23
- Label: GEM
- Producer: Bob Potter

Ronnie Lane chronology
Rough Mix (1977)	See Me (1979)	Majik Mijits (1981)

Professional ratings
Review scores
Source	Rating
AllMusic	3/5 stars
Q	3/5 stars
The Rolling Stone Album Guide	3/5 stars

See Me is the fourth and the last solo studio album by the English musician Ronnie Lane. The album was released 18 years before Lane's death. Lane had previously been a founding member of Small Faces and Faces.

During the recording of Rough Mix (1977), Lane's multiple sclerosis was diagnosed. Nonetheless he toured, wrote and recorded (with Eric Clapton among others) and in 1979 released another album, See Me, which features several songs written by Lane and Clapton. Around this time, Lane travelled the highways and byways of England and lived a 'passing show' modern nomadic life in full Gypsy traveller costume and accommodation.

== Track listings ==
All tracks composed by Ronnie Lane; except where indicated

1. "One Step" (Ronnie Lane, Alun Davies) – 3:34
2. "Good Ol' Boys Boogie" – 3:31
3. "Lad's Got Money" – 4:57
4. "She's Leaving" (Lane, Alun Davies) – 3:41
5. "Barcelona" (Lane, Eric Clapton) – 5:15
6. "Kuschty Rye" (Lane, Kate Lambert) – 4:10
7. "Don't Tell Me Now" – 2:52
8. "You're So Right" – 2:22
9. "Only You" – 4:03
10. "Winning With Women" (Lane, Lambert) – 4:08
11. "Way Up Yonder" (Traditional, arranged by Ronnie Lane) – 2:50

== Personnel ==
- Ronnie Lane – lead vocals, bass, drums, guitar
- Alun Davies – guitar, rhythm guitar
- Charlie Hart – accordion, bass, fiddle, piano, strings

Additional musicians

- Eric Clapton – guitar (3, 5, 11)
- Henry McCullough – guitar, piano
- Cal Batchelor – guitar
- Brian Belshaw – bass
- Chrissy Stewart – bass
- Bruce Rowland – drums
- Steve Simpson – fiddle, mandolin, strings
- Billy Livsey – organ, piano
- Carol Grimes – backing vocals
