= Relax Your Mind (album) =

Studio album by Jon & Alun Davies
- Released: 1963
- Recorded: 1963
- Genre: Folk, Skiffle, Progressive folk, blues
- Label: Decca LK 4547
- Producer: Shel Talmy

Relax Your Mind is the debut, and only, album by the folk duo Jon & Alun who five years later founded the short-lived late-1960s English rock band Sweet Thursday. Jon Mark is best known for his records with Marianne Faithfull, John Mayall and Mark-Almond. Alun Davies became Cat Stevens's guitarist.

== Track listing ==
Side one

1. "Relax Your Mind" (Burchell, Davies)
2. "Walk to the Gallows" (Burchell, Davies)
3. "I'm My Own Grandpa" (Dwight Latham, Moe Jaffe)
4. "The Poor Fool’s Blues" (Burchell, Davies)
5. "Black is the Colour" (Traditional; arranged by Shel Talmy, Stone)
6. "Easy Rambler" (Burchell, Davies)
7. "I Never Will Marry" (Traditional; arranged by Shel Talmy, Stone)

Side two

1. "Alberta" (Traditional; arranged by Shel Talmy, Stone)
2. "John B." (Traditional; arranged by Shel Talmy, Stone)
3. "The Song of the Salvation Army" (Traditional; arranged by Shel Talmy, Stone)
4. "Lone Green Valley" (Traditional; arranged by Shel Talmy, Stone)
5. "The Way of Life" (Burchell, Davies)
6. "Sinking of the Reuben James" (Woody Guthrie)

== Personnel ==
- Alun Davies - guitar, vocals
- Jon Mark - guitar, vocals

with:

- Judd Proctor - banjo, rhythm guitar
- Big Jim Sullivan - electric guitar, twelve-string guitar
- Arthur Watts - bass
- Shel Talmy: Producer
