= Tea for the Tillerman =

1970 studio album by Cat Stevens

Studio album by Cat Stevens
- Released: 23 November 1970
- Recorded: May–July 1970
- Studios: Morgan, London; Island, London; Olympic, London
- Genre: Folk rock
- Length: 36:49
- Labels: Island (UK/Europe); A&M (US/Canada)
- Producer: Paul Samwell-Smith

Cat Stevens chronology
Mona Bone Jakon (1970)	Tea for the Tillerman (1970)	Teaser and the Firecat (1971)

Singles from Tea for the Tillerman
- 1. "Father and Son" Released: August 1970; 2. "Wild World" Released: September 1970

Tea for the Tillerman is the fourth studio album by British-born singer-songwriter Cat Stevens, released on 23 November 1970 by Island Records in the United Kingdom and A&M in North America. Recorded between May and July 1970 at three studios in London (Morgan, Island, and Olympic), it features some of Stevens's most iconic and best-known songs including the singles "Wild World" and "Father and Son". Numerous of its songs have been featured in films, including "But I Might Die Tonight" for the Jerzy Skolimowski film Deep End. It reached the top 10 in the US and the top 20 in the UK, and is now considered one of the greatest albums of all time by several publications.

== Overview ==
Tea for the Tillerman includes many of Stevens's best-known songs such as "Where Do the Children Play?", "Hard Headed Woman", "Wild World", "Sad Lisa", "Into White", and "Father and Son". Stevens, a former art student, created the artwork featured on the record's cover.

In November 2008, a "Deluxe Edition" was released featuring a second disc of demos and live recordings. In January 2012, a hi-res 24/192 kHz version was remastered using an Ampex ATR100 and a MSB Technology Studio ADC and released on HDtracks.com.

Fifty years after the original album's release, in September 2020, Stevens remade the album as Tea for the Tillerman^{2}, including new lyrics and new instrumentation, and he sings along with his 22-year-old self in "Father and Son". That same year, Tea for the Tillerman was re-released as a 50th Anniversary Super Deluxe Edition. Along with five discs, the Super Deluxe Edition also includes a Blu-ray containing music videos, live videos, and audio of the 2020 mixes of the original album, as well as a 12" vinyl record of live recordings by Stevens in 1970 at the Troubadour, Los Angeles.

== Critical reception ==
Professional ratings
Review scores
Source	Rating
AllMusic	5/5 stars
Christgau's Record Guide	B−
Encyclopedia of Popular Music	5/5 stars

In a contemporary review for The Village Voice, music critic Robert Christgau found the music monotonous and lacking the "dry delicacy" Stevens exhibited on Mona Bone Jakon (1970). Rolling Stone magazine's Ben Gerson said that Stevens's songs effortlessly resonate beyond their artfully simple lyrics and hooks, despite his occasional overuse of dynamics "for dramatic effect."

In a retrospective five-star review, AllMusic's William Ruhlmann praised Stevens's themes of spirituality and transcendence, and felt that he had continued to show his ability as a pop melodicist: "As a result, Tea for the Tillerman became a big seller and, for the second time in four years, its creator became a pop star." On 18 November 2003, Rolling Stone included this album in its 500 Greatest Albums of All Time list at number 206, number 208 in a 2012 revised list, and currently at number 205 on its latest list published in 2020. In 2006, the album was included in the book 1001 Albums You Must Hear Before You Die. In 2007, the album was included in the list of "The Definitive 200 Albums of All Time", released by The National Association of Recording Merchandisers and the Rock and Roll Hall of Fame. It was voted number 342 in Colin Larkin's All Time Top 1000 Albums.

== Track listing ==
All songs were written by Cat Stevens.

=== Original release ===
Side one
No.	Title	Length
1.	"Where Do the Children Play?" (Recorded July 1970 at Morgan Studios)	3:52
2.	"Hard Headed Woman" (Recorded July 1970 at Morgan)	3:47
3.	"Wild World" (Recorded July 1970 at Morgan)	3:20
4.	"Sad Lisa" (Recorded July 1970 at Morgan)	3:45
5.	"Miles from Nowhere" (Recorded June 1970 at Olympic Studios)	3:37

Side two
No.	Title	Length
6.	"But I Might Die Tonight" (Recorded May 1970 at Island Studios - from the film Deep End)	1:53
7.	"Longer Boats" (Recorded June 1970 at Olympic)	3:12
8.	"Into White" (Recorded June 1970 at Olympic)	3:24
9.	"On the Road to Find Out" (Recorded May 1970 at Island)	5:08
10.	"Father and Son" (Recorded July 1970 at Morgan - from Revolussia)	3:41
11.	"Tea for the Tillerman" (Recorded May 1970 at Island)	1:01

=== Deluxe Edition ===
==== Disc one ====
Original album.

==== Disc two ====
All tracks are written by Cat Stevens.

Deluxe Edition: Disc 2
No.	Title	Length
1.	"Wild World" (Demo)	3:14
2.	"Longer Boats" (Recorded: 1 May 1971 at Troubadour Club, Los Angeles)	2:51
3.	"Into White" (Recorded: 1 May 1971 at Troubadour Club, Los Angeles)	3:37
4.	"Miles from Nowhere" (Demo)	3:14
5.	"Hard Headed Woman" (Recorded: 22 July 1974 at Sunplaza Hall, Nakano, Tokyo, Japan)	3:57
6.	"Where Do the Children Play?" (Recorded: 22 February 1976 at William & Mary College, Williamsburg, Virginia)	3:20
7.	"Sad Lisa" (Recorded: 22 February 1976 at William & Mary College, Williamsburg, Virginia)	3:13
8.	"On the Road to Find Out" (Recorded: 8 June 1971 at KCET PBS TV Full Circle, Los Angeles)	4:57
9.	"Father and Son" (Yusuf's Café Sessions)	4:25
10.	"Wild World" (Yusuf's Café Sessions)	3:03
11.	"Tea for the Tillerman" (Recorded: 27 November 1971 at BBC 2 TV Broadcast, London, England)	0:50

=== Super Deluxe Edition ===
==== Discs one, two and three ====
The first disc on the Super Deluxe Edition contains 2020 remasters of the original album; the second disc contains 2020 mixes of the original album; and the third disc contains Tea for the Tillerman^{2}.

==== Disc four ====
All tracks are written by Cat Stevens.

Deluxe Edition: Disc 4
No.	Title	Length
1.	"Don't Be Shy"	2:51
2.	"The Joke"	3:13
3.	"I've Got a Thing About Seeing My Grandson Grow Old" (Outtake)	2:41
4.	"Honey Man" (with Elton John)	3:08
5.	"But I Might Die Tonight" (Movie Version / From the Deep End Original Motion Picture Soundtrack)	2:31
6.	"Love Lives in the Sky"	3:12
7.	"Can This Be Love?"	4:04
8.	"If You Want to Sing Out, Sing Out"	2:45
9.	"It's So Good"	2:28
10.	"Miles from Nowhere" (Demo Version)	3:14
11.	"Wild World" (Demo Version)	3:14
12.	"If You Want to Sing Out, Sing Out" (Demo)	2:59
13.	"Don't Be Shy" (Demo)	2:41

==== Disc five ====
All tracks are written by Cat Stevens.

Deluxe Edition: Disc 5
No.	Title	Length
1.	"Where Do the Children Play?" (Live at the Troubadour, Los Angeles, 1970)	4:02
2.	"Hard Headed Woman" (Live at the Troubadour, Los Angeles, 1970)	3:53
3.	"Longer Boats" (Live at the Troubadour, Los Angeles, 1970)	2:56
4.	"Wild World" (Live at the Troubadour, Los Angeles, 1970)	3:32
5.	"On the Road to Find Out" (Live at the Troubadour, Los Angeles, 1970)	5:13
6.	"Father and Son" (Live at the Troubadour, Los Angeles, 1970)	3:52
7.	"Into White" (Live at the Troubadour, Los Angeles, 1970)	4:00
8.	"On the Road to Find Out" (Live at KCET Studios, Los Angeles, 1971)	4:59
9.	"Where Do the Children Play?" (Live at KCET Studios, Los Angeles, 1971)	3:46
10.	"Wild World" (Live at KCET Studios, Los Angeles, 1971)	3:40
11.	"Miles from Nowhere" (Live at KCET Studios, Los Angeles, 1971)	4:03
12.	"Longer Boats" (Live at KCET Studios, Los Angeles, 1971)	3:47
13.	"Father and Son" (Live at KCET Studios, Los Angeles, 1971)	3:30
14.	"Wild World" ("Cat Stevens in Concert", 1971)	3:40
15.	"Into White" ("Cat Stevens in Concert", 1971)	3:21
16.	"Tea for the Tillerman" (Live on BBC Radio, 1970)	0:50
17.	"Wild World" (Live on the Beat Club, 1970)	3:48
18.	"Hard Headed Woman" (Live on the Beat Club, 1970)	3:59
19.	"Wild World" (Recorded for ORTF, Pop deux, 1970)	3:38
20.	"Father and Son" (Live at the Fillmore East, New York, 1970)	3:44

=== Re-recording ===
On 28 May 2020, Yusuf (also known as Cat Stevens) announced his new album, Tea for the Tillerman^{2}, which was released on 18 September 2020. Tea for the Tillerman^{2} is a reimagining of "the same eleven songs for a new age with dramatic results", celebrating the 50th anniversary of Tea for the Tillerman.

== Personnel ==
Adapted from liner notes of 2020 CD reissue.

- Cat Stevens – guitar (tracks 1 to 3, 5 to 10), keyboards (tracks 1, 3 to 7, 10, 11), vibraphone (track 1), Hammond organ (track 9), lead vocals (all tracks), backing vocals (1, 5 to 7, 9, 11)
- Alun Davies – guitar (tracks 1 to 10), backing vocals (tracks 1, 5 to 7, 9)
- Harvey Burns – drums and percussion (tracks 1 to 3, 5 to 7, 9, 10)
- John Ryan – double bass (tracks 1 to 3, 5 to 10)
- Del Newman – string arrangements (tracks 1, 2, 4, 8)
- Jack Rothstein (as John Rostein) – solo violin (track 4)
- Paul Samwell-Smith – backing vocals (tracks 1, 5 to 7, 9, 11)

Technical

- Cat Stevens - front cover illustration
- Shepard "Shep" Sherbell - photography

== Charts ==
=== Weekly charts ===
Chart (1970–1977)	Peak position
Australia Albums (Kent Music Report)	2
German Albums (Offizielle Top 100)	43
New Zealand Albums (RMNZ)	20
Norwegian Albums (VG-lista)	25
UK Albums (Official Charts)	20
US Billboard 200	8

Chart (2020)	Peak position
Austrian Albums (Ö3 Austria)	13
German Albums (Offizielle Top 100)	22
Spanish Albums (Promusicae)	99
Swiss Albums (Schweizer Hitparade)	45

=== Year-end charts ===
Chart (1971)	Position
US Billboard 200	8

== Certifications ==
Region	Certification	Certified units/sales
Australia (ARIA)	Platinum	70,000^{^}
Brazil (Pro-Música Brasil) Super Deluxe	Gold	100,000^{‡}
France (SNEP)	Gold	100,000^{*}
Germany (BVMI)	Platinum	500,000^{^}
New Zealand (RMNZ)	Gold	7,500^{‡}
United Kingdom (BPI)	Gold	100,000^{*}
United States (RIAA)	3× Platinum	3,000,000^{^}
^{*} Sales figures based on certification alone.^{^} Shipments figures based on certification alone.^{‡} Sales+streaming figures based on certification alone.

== In popular culture ==
"Tea for the Tillerman" was used as the closing title track of the British sitcom Extras.

The opening scene to a 2014 episode of The Simpsons titled "Super Franchise Me" parodied the artwork to this album, with the title track playing over it.

A previously unreleased version of "But I Might Die Tonight", was used in the 1970 film Deep End in the opening and closing scenes. The version of the song used in the film was eventually released in 2020.

Four of the songs from this album were used in the 1971 film Harold and Maude: "Tea for the Tillerman"; "Where Do the Children Play"; "Miles from Nowhere" and "On the Road to Find Out".

The song "Father and Son", was used in the closing scene of the 2017 film Guardians of the Galaxy Vol. 2. The song is also featured in the 2009 film The Boat That Rocked.
