= Peace Train =

- German vinyl single

Single by Cat Stevens

from the album Teaser and the Firecat
- B-side: "Where Do the Children Play?" (US/Canada/Europe); "Tuesday's Dead" (UK)
- Released: 1971 (worldwide); September 1971 (US)
- Recorded: March 1971
- Studio: Morgan, Willesden, London
- Genre: Soft rock; folk
- Length: 4:12 (album version); 3:45 (single version)
- Label: Island (UK/Europe); A&M (US/Canada)
- Songwriter: Cat Stevens
- Producer: Paul Samwell-Smith

Cat Stevens singles chronology
"Moonshadow" (1971)	"Peace Train" (1971)	"Ruby Love" (1971)

"Peace Train" is a 1971 song by British singer-songwriter Cat Stevens, taken from his album Teaser and the Firecat. The song climbed to No. 7 on the Billboard Hot 100 chart during the week of November 6, 1971, becoming Stevens' first US Top 10 hit. The song also spent three weeks at No. 1 on the adult contemporary chart. It has been featured on several compilations, including the 1975 Greatest Hits album.

Stevens later re-recorded the song for the charity War Child in 2003.

In the album version, the instrumental ending features a string section which drops out leaving the solo acoustic guitar playing of Cat Stevens, before the song's fade.

== History ==
In a concert during the 1970s, he introduced the song with the revelation that he wrote the song whilst on a train, and was thinking about Alfred Hitchcock, no doubt reflecting the fact that many of Alfred Hitchcock's film plots were set on trains.

Cat Stevens later converted to Islam, changed his name to Yusuf Islam, and significantly reduced his public appearances, but during the Iraq War he commented on the song's renewed relevance, saying: "'Peace Train' is a song I wrote, the message of which continues to breeze thunderously through the hearts of millions. There is a powerful need for people to feel that gust of hope rise up again. As a member of humanity and as a Muslim, this is my contribution to the call for a peaceful solution."

Stevens performed the song live at the 2006 Nobel Peace Prize Concert ceremony when Muhammad Yunus of Bangladesh received the award. The interlude during the song where the background singers chant "Kumbayaba" was removed for this version. He also performed the song as part of a comedic skit at Jon Stewart's Rally to Restore Sanity, along with Ozzy Osbourne, and at the New Zealand national remembrance service for the Christchurch mosque shootings, held at Hagley Park on 29 March 2019.

Teaming up with Playing for Change, in 2021 Yusuf/Cat Stevens recorded a new version of "Peace Train" with over 25 musicians from 12 countries.

== Critical reception ==
Record World called it a "beautiful follow-up to 'Moonshadow' and 'Wild World,'" and praised the "delightful production."

However, Robert Christgau criticized "Peace Train's" message in his November 1972 Newsday review of a concert by Stevens at the New York Philharmonic Hall: "I don't mind when Johnny Nash sings a charming ditty about how things are getting better, but when Stevens informs the world that we're all on a peace train, I get annoyed. We're not, and if Stevens ever stops shaking his head long enough to see clearly for a second, he might realize it."

== Chart history ==
=== Weekly charts ===
Chart (1971)	Peak position
Australia (Kent Music Report)	3
Canada RPM Adult Contemporary	22
Canada RPM Top Singles	3
New Zealand (Listener)	2
U.S. Billboard Hot 100	7
U.S. Billboard Easy Listening	1
U.S. Cash Box Top 100	4

=== Year-end charts ===
Chart (1971)	Rank
Australia	48
Canada	48
U.S. Top Easy Listening Singles (Billboard)	13

== Cover versions ==
Aside from Stevens' original recording, a cover version of "Peace Train" was recorded by the American alternative rock band 10,000 Maniacs. The song originally appeared on the band's 1987 album, In My Tribe, but it failed to chart. After Stevens' comment, which some interpreted as calling for the death of Salman Rushdie, 10,000 Maniacs lead singer Natalie Merchant had "Peace Train" removed from all future pressings of the album in the U.S.

In 1995, a cover of "Peace Train" was included on the Don Williams CD Borrowed Tales. In 1996, Dolly Parton included a version of "Peace Train", accompanied by South African vocal group Ladysmith Black Mambazo, on her album of covers Treasures. Parton produced a CBS television special, airing in November 1996, to promote the album, in which she described "Peace Train" as a personal favorite. The special also included a brief interview of Yusuf Islam, describing how he came to write the song. (Islam later joined Parton on a cover of another of his songs, "Where Do the Children Play?", playing guitar on the track for her 2005 album Those Were the Days). In 1997, Parton released the song as a single and filmed a music video, directed by Christopher Ciccone, brother of entertainer Madonna. The single was a hit on the US Dance chart peaking at No. 23.

The song has also been covered by Tony Meléndez in 1987, Jann Arden in 2007, Zain Bhikha in 2008, Laleh, Richie Havens, Melanie, Sam Harris, and Rob Tobias and Friends. The song was also remixed by the DJ Junior Vasquez.

== In popular culture ==
The song has appeared in the films The War, Remember the Titans, Ordinary Magic, We Are Marshall, and Jobs. Richie Havens's cover was included in the soundtrack of The Wonder Years TV series.

"Peace Train", along with several other Cat Stevens songs, appeared in the 2015 American comedy film Rock the Kasbah.

== See also ==
- List of anti-war songs
- List of number-one adult contemporary singles of 1971 (U.S.)
