= Where Do the Children Play? =

- 2020 re-release

Song by Cat Stevens

from the album Tea for the Tillerman
- Released: 23 November 1970
- Genre: Folk rock
- Label: Island (UK/Europe); A&M (US/Canada)
- Songwriter: Cat Stevens
- Producer: Paul Samwell-Smith

"Where Do the Children Play?" is a song written and recorded by English singer-songwriter Cat Stevens, released as the opening track on his November 1970 album Tea for the Tillerman, as well as the B-side to 1971 single "Peace Train".

== Background ==
In an interview with Songwriter Universe, Stevens stated that some inspiration for the song came from his childhood growing up in post-World War II London:

"At the time I was growing up in London, there were bomb ruins, because the war had just ended. There were still signs of destruction all around. And there weren’t many gardens… you had Hyde Park… you had to travel quite a long way to get there. So there was a yearning for the countryside and space for kids. At my school, we had a basement. It was like a lower ground floor. That’s where the boys played, confined to that small basement. That was the reality of growing up in the city, so that’s where 'Where Do The Children Play?' comes from."

William Ruhlmann of AllMusic described the song as a "statement of purpose", where "Stevens questioned the value of technology and progress."

In 2017, Garbage recorded a cover of the song for United Nations charity album, Music To Inspire: Artists UNited Against Human Trafficking.

In 2020, Stevens re-recorded "Where Do the Children Play?" for the 50th anniversary re-imagining of Tea for the Tillerman, titled Tea for the Tillerman 2. He released a new stop-motion music video to commemorate its release. The video displays two children, both living in a polluted and wrecked world. Most of the scenery and props were made from recycled materials in order to "minimize the production impact on the environment."
