= One for the Road (Ronnie Lane album) =

Studio album by Ronnie Lane
- Released: 15 January 1976
- Recorded: Autumn 1975
- Studio: Ronnie Lane's Mobile Studio
- Genre: Folk rock
- Length: 40:11
- Label: Island
- Producer: Ronnie Lane

Ronnie Lane chronology
Ronnie Lane's Slim Chance (1975)	One for the Road (1976)	Mahoney's Last Stand (w/ Ron Wood) (1976)

Professional ratings
Review scores
Source	Rating
AllMusic	4/5 stars
The Rolling Stone Album Guide	4/5 stars

One for the Road is the third album by Ronnie Lane and his Slim Chance band. Lane had previously been a founding member of Small Faces and Faces. The album was recorded using Ronnie Lane's Mobile Studio.

== Track listing ==
All tracks composed by Ronnie Lane; except where indicated

1. "Don't Try 'n' Change My Mind" – 3:06
2. "32nd Street" – 4:34
3. "Snake" – 3:27
4. "Burnin' Summer" – 4:06
5. "One for the Road" – 4:46
6. "Steppin' and Reelin'" – 6:27
7. "Harvest Home" (Lane, Charlie Hart) – 5:50
8. "Nobody's Listenin'" – 3:54
9. "G'morning" – 4:01

== Personnel ==
- Ronnie Lane – guitar, lead vocals

Slim Chance

- Steve Simpson – guitar, mandolin, fiddle, keyboards, harmonica, vocals
- Charlie Hart – violin, keyboards, harp, whistle, accordion
- Brian Belshaw – bass, vocals
- Colin Davey – drums, vocals

== Production ==
- Ronnie Lane - producer
- George Chkiantz, Ron Fawcus - recording engineer
- Chris Thomas - mixing
- Nicholas de Ville - cover
- Willie Christie - photography
- John Tobler - liner notes
