= Ronnie Lane =

English rock musician (1946–1997)

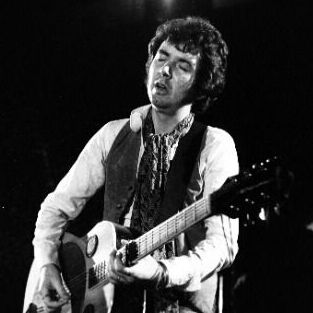
- Lane performing with Slim Chance, 1975

Background information
- Also known as: Plonk; Three-Piece
- Born: Ronald Frederick Lane; 1 April 1946; Plaistow, Essex, England
- Died: 4 June 1997 (aged 51) Trinidad, Colorado, US
- Genres: Rock; rhythm and blues; psychedelic rock; folk rock
- Occupations: Musician; songwriter; record producer
- Instruments: Bass guitar; vocals; guitar
- Years active: 1964–1992
- Labels: A&M; Atlantic; Immediate; Island
- Formerly of: Small Faces, Faces

Ronald Frederick Lane (1 April 1946 – 4 June 1997) was an English musician and songwriter who was the bassist and co-founder of the rock bands Small Faces (1965–1969) and Faces (1969–1973).

Lane formed Small Faces in 1965 after meeting Steve Marriott, with whom he subsequently wrote many of their hit singles including "All or Nothing", "Itchycoo Park" and "Lazy Sunday". After Marriott left Small Faces in 1968, band members Lane, Ian McLagan and Kenny Jones were joined by Rod Stewart and Ronnie Wood to form Faces. Like Small Faces, the band achieved critical and commercial success. Lane quit the Faces in 1973 and subsequently collaborated with other musicians, leading his own bands and pursuing a solo career. In 1977, he was diagnosed with multiple sclerosis. He was supported by charity projects and financial contributions from friends, former bandmates and fans. After living with the disease for 21 years, he died in June 1997, aged 51.

For his work in both Small Faces and Faces, Lane was inducted posthumously into the Rock and Roll Hall of Fame in 2012.

He had two children, and two stepchildren who took his name.

== Early life ==
Lane was born in Plaistow Maternity Hospital, Plaistow, then a working-class area in London, to Elsie Lane and Stanley Lane, a lorry driver. Lane later described his father as a "saint" who would work a long workday and then return home to nurse his wife and two sons, all of whom were diagnosed with multiple sclerosis (MS) at different points in their lives. Doctors assured Lane as a child that the destructive disease was not necessarily inherited, although he found out later in his life that he had indeed inherited it.

After leaving school at the age of 16, Lane met Kenney Jones at a local pub, and they formed a group they named the Outcasts. Initially playing lead guitar, Lane quickly switched to bass. When shopping for a Harmony bass guitar, Lane visited the J60 Music Bar in Manor Park, London, where he met employee Steve Marriott. Lane bought his bass, and went to Marriott's house after work, where Marriott introduced him to his Motown and Stax record collection. Lane and Marriott set out to form a band, recruiting friends Jimmy Winston, who switched from guitar to organ, and Jones. Marriott was chosen to be the frontman and singer.

== Career ==
=== Small Faces ===
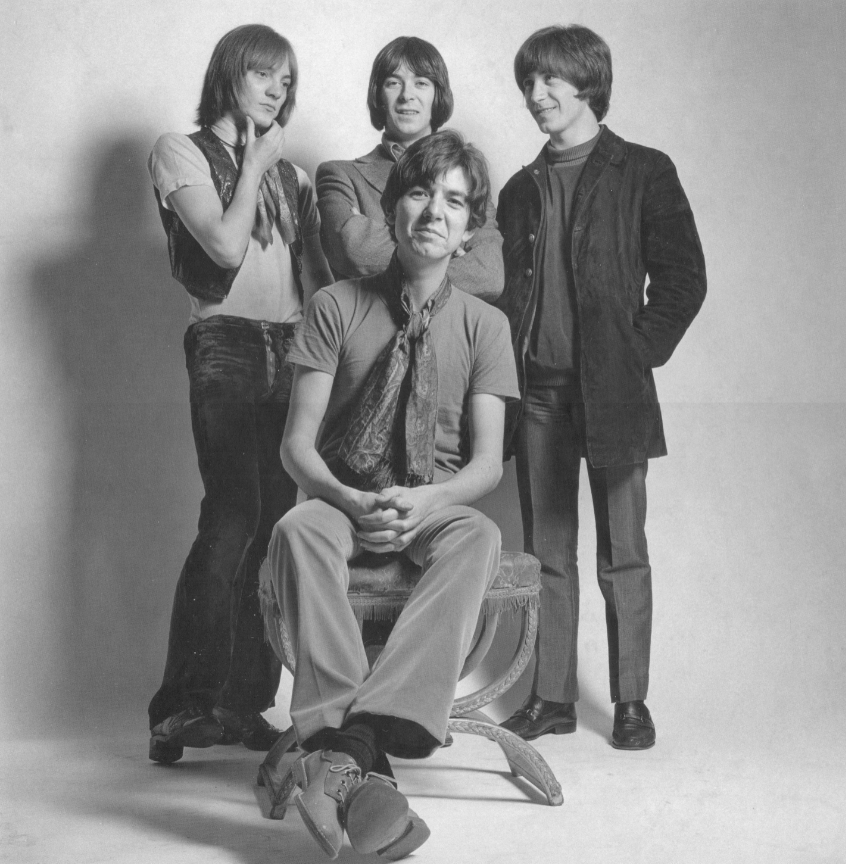
Lane (seated) with Small Faces in 1968

The Small Faces consisted of Lane on bass guitar, Marriott as guitarist and lead vocalist, Jones as drummer, and Winston on keyboards. (The name "Small" was chosen as they were each no more than 5' 6" in height.) They made their debut in 1965, with Ian McLagan replacing Winston in November 1965. They had a successful chart career; Lane and Marriott wrote hit singles consistently, including "Itchycoo Park" and "All or Nothing". He co-wrote all but one of the tracks on their 1968 concept album Ogdens' Nut Gone Flake. The album stayed at number one on the UK Albums Chart for six weeks. When Marriott left the group in 1969, they disbanded.

=== Faces ===
Lane formed Faces with McLagan, Jones, Ronnie Wood and Rod Stewart in 1969. He shared composing or co-composing duties with Stewart, Wood, and McLagan. By 1972, with the band's frontman Stewart focusing on his own solo career, Lane took a central role during the recording of their fourth and final album, Ooh La La. Unhappy due to poor reviews of the album and Stewart's lack of commitment, Lane quit in 1973, making his last appearance on 4 June at the Sundown Theatre in Edmonton, London. He was replaced by Tetsu Yamauchi but tellingly the group made no further studio albums following Lane's departure, and split in 1975. According to McLagan, Lane would later regret leaving Faces. "Debris" was one of his more famous vocalist songs.

=== Move to Wales ===
In 1973, Lane moved to Fishpool Farm in the village of Hyssington, Montgomeryshire, Wales, just over the border from England. In the late 1970s, already beginning to feel the effects of MS, he moved back to London.

=== Slim Chance and later career ===
After leaving the Faces, Lane formed his own band, Slim Chance, who recorded the singles "How Come" (UK No. 11) and "The Poacher" (UK No. 36) and the album Anymore for Anymore, showcasing a blend of British rock, folk and country music. The original line-up of this band included Scottish singer-songwriters Benny Gallagher and Graham Lyle, who provided harmony vocals and played a variety of instruments including keyboards, accordion, acoustic guitar, mandolin, banjo and harmonica. They left in May 1974 to continue their career as a duo, though they would appear on 1977's Rough Mix as guests.

After initial success he toured the UK with "The Passing Show", a circus-type carnival complete with tents and barkers. Viv Stanshall, from the Bonzo Dog Doo Dah Band, served briefly as ringmaster (of sorts). Gallagher & Lyle were replaced with Scottish duo Lucas & McCulloch who provided accordion, mandolin, guitars and banjo. They also acted as support act along with fiddle player Kenny Slaven who multi tracked all the string parts on "The Poacher". Lane moved to Island Records and issued Ronnie Lane's Slim Chance and One for the Road. In late 1976 he joined a short-lived reformation of Small Faces but quit after two rehearsals, to be replaced by Rick Wills (who later played alongside former Small Faces drummer Kenney Jones in the Jones Gang). However, Lane had signed a contract with Atlantic Records as part of the Small Faces and was informed that he owed the company an album. His ensuing album with Pete Townshend, Rough Mix, produced by Glyn Johns, which was released in 1977, was lauded as contender for best album of the year by many critics, but the label did not promote it and sales were lacklustre.

During the recording of Rough Mix, Lane's multiple sclerosis was diagnosed. Nonetheless, he toured, wrote and recorded (with Eric Clapton among others) and in 1979 released another album, See Me, which features several songs written by Lane and Clapton. Around this time Lane travelled the highways and byways of England and lived a 'passing show' modern nomadic life in full Gypsy traveller costume and accommodation.

In 1983, his girlfriend Boo Oldfield contacted Glyn Johns with a view to organising a concert to help fund Action for Research into Multiple Sclerosis. Johns was already arranging Clapton's Command Performance for Prince Charles so they decided to book the Royal Albert Hall for a further two nights and host a benefit concert. The resulting ARMS Charity Concerts featured Eric Clapton, Jimmy Page, Jeff Beck, Bill Wyman, Charlie Watts, Ronnie Wood, Kenney Jones, Andy Fairweather Low, Steve Winwood, Ray Cooper, James Hooker, Fernando Saunders, Chris Stainton, Tony Hymas, Simon Phillips and others. With the addition of Joe Cocker and Paul Rodgers they toured the US.

== Later life and death ==
Lane emigrated to the US in 1984 first to Houston and then Austin, where the climate was more beneficial to his health, where he continued playing, writing, and recording. He formed an American version of Slim Chance, which continued to be a loose-knit conglomeration of available musicians. For much of the time Alejandro Escovedo was a constant member. For close to a decade Lane enjoyed rock royalty status in the Austin area. He toured Japan but his health continued to decline. His last performance was in 1992 with Ronnie Wood and Ian McLagan.

In 1994 Lane and his wife Susan moved to the small town of Trinidad, Colorado. Jimmy Page, Rod Stewart and Ronnie Wood funded his medical care as no royalties from the Small Faces work were forthcoming. Lane died from pneumonia during the final stages of multiple sclerosis on 4 June 1997. He was buried in the Masonic Cemetery in Trinidad, Colorado. An album of live BBC recordings to raise money for his care was unreleased on his death.

== Tributes ==
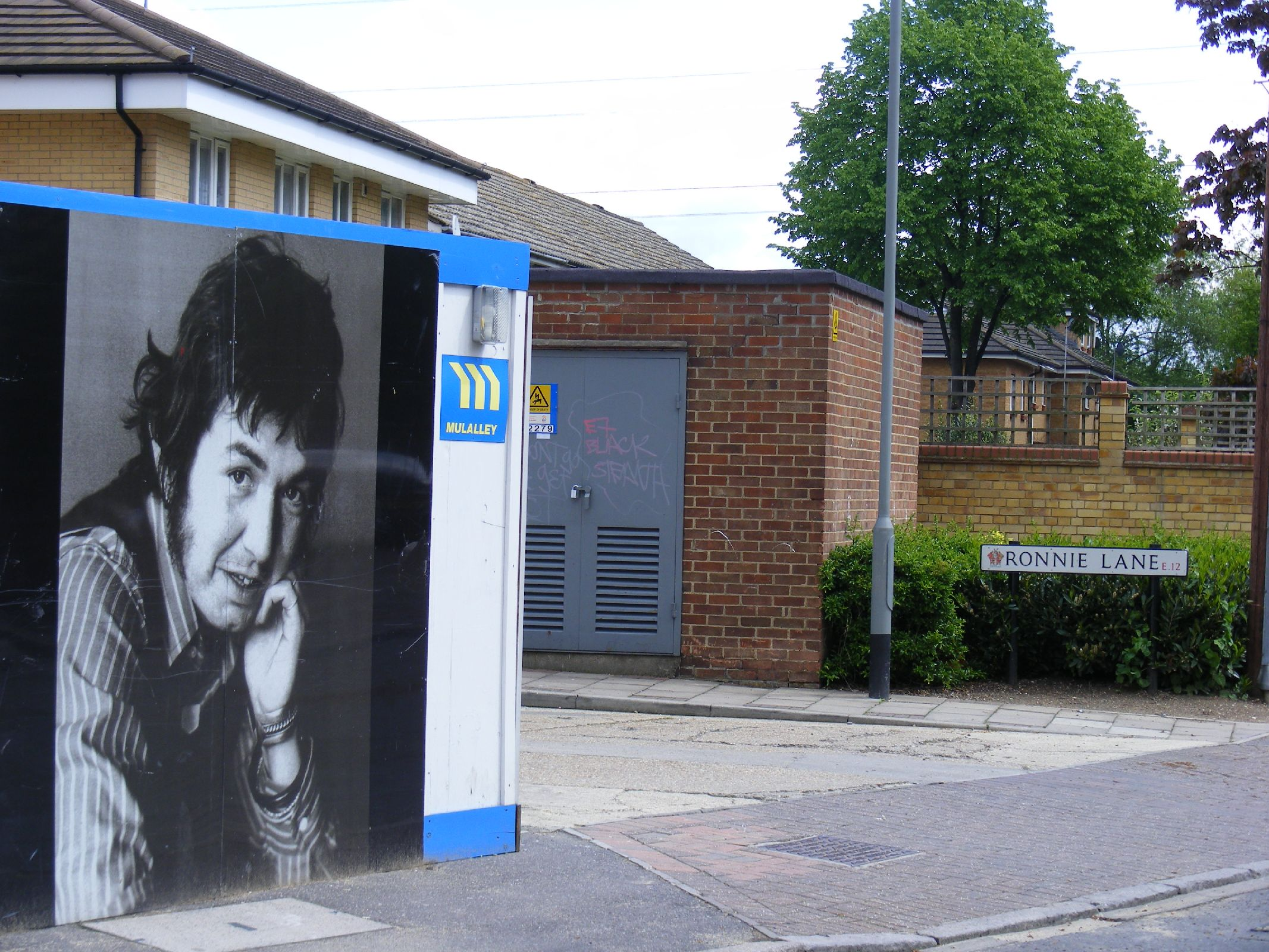
"Ronnie Lane", the street in Manor Park, Newham named after him

Ride recorded "A Trip Down Ronnie Lane" as a B-side to their single "Black Nite Crash" in 1996. The Ocean Colour Scene song "Travellers Tune" on their 1997 studio album Marchin' Already was inspired by and written in the memory of Lane, a strong influence on the group, which appeared at the tribute concert for Ronnie Lane. Likewise Lane had been such a source of inspiration to the members of Poi Dog Pondering that they created a tribute page for him and in 1995 band member Susan Voelz covered Lane's song, "Glad and Sorry" on her 1995 album, Summer Crashing, "out of her respect and affection for Ronnie Lane".

In 2000, Paul Weller recorded "He's the Keeper", a song dedicated to Lane's memory. An album of live and in-studio recordings from Lane's Austin days was later culled, and released as Live in Austin.

A street was named after him, "Ronnie Lane", in Manor Park in 2001. In January 2006 BBC Four broadcast an extensive documentary about Lane, The Passing Show that had been in preparation since 2000 and included footage of vintage concerts by the Faces and Slim Chance. In October 2006 the documentary was also shown on BBC Two. In 2012, former Small Faces bandmate Ian MacLagan interpreted some of Lane's best-known songs in a record titled Spiritual Boy: In Appreciation of Ronnie Lane. McLagan died in 2014.

In 2019 longtime collaborator Charlie Hart compiled Just For A Moment, a six-CD set of Lane's compositions that included many unreleased songs.

== Discography ==
=== Solo ===
Studio albums

- Anymore for Anymore with Slim Chance (1974) UK No. 48
- Ronnie Lane's Slim Chance with Slim Chance (1975)
- One for the Road with Slim Chance (1976)
- Mahoney's Last Stand with Ronnie Wood (1976) Atlantic
- Rough Mix with Pete Townshend (1977) US No. 45 UK No. 44
- See Me (1979)
- The Legendary Majik Mijits with Steve Marriott (recorded 1981, released 2000)

Live albums

- You Never Can Tell (The BBC Sessions) (1997)
- Live in Austin (2000)
- Rocket 69 (Live on German TV) (2001)
- Ronnie Lane Memorial Concert (remastered edition) (2021)

Compilations

- Kuschty Rye (The Singles 1973–1980) (1997)
- Tin and Tambourine (compilation) (1999)
- April Fool (album) (1999)
- How Come (2001)
- Ain't No One Like (2003)
- Just for a Moment (2006)
- Ooh La La: An Island Harvest (2014)
- Just for a Moment: Music 1973–1997 (6CD box set) (2019)

=== Other appearances ===
Single

- "How Come?"/"Done This One Before"

Various artist albums

- Happy Birthday (1970)
- I Am (1972)
- With Love (1976)

Participation

- Never a Dull Moment by Rod Stewart – Lane bass on two songs (1972)
- Victory Gardens by John & Mary – vocal on one song (1991)

=== with Small Faces ===
Studio albums

- Small Faces (1966)
- Small Faces (1967)
- Ogdens' Nut Gone Flake (1968)

=== with Faces ===
Studio albums

- First Step (1970)
- Long Player (1971)
- A Nod Is as Good as a Wink... to a Blind Horse (1971)
- Ooh La La (1973)
