= Banapple Gas =

- French single sleeve

Single by Cat Stevens

from the album Numbers
- B-side: "Ghost Town"
- Released: March 1976
- Recorded: October 1975
- Studio: Le Studio, Morin-Heights, Canada
- Genre: Soft rock, folk rock
- Length: 3:07
- Label: Island (UK/Europe); A&M (US/Canada)
- Songwriter: Cat Stevens
- Producer: Cat Stevens

Cat Stevens singles chronology
"Two Fine People" (1975)	"Banapple Gas" (1976)	"(Remember the Days of the) Old Schoolyard" (1977)

"Banapple Gas" is a song written and recorded by English singer-songwriter Cat Stevens in October 1975, initially released on his album Numbers. Stevens recorded the song at Le Studio, in Morin-Heights, Canada. It was released as a single in March 1976, reaching no. 41 on the US Billboard Hot 100 and no. 7 in the Netherlands, though it didn't chart in the UK.

== Background and meaning ==
The song ties into the concept for Stevens's album Numbers, which is a spiritual musical set on the fictional planet Polygor. (Note: See also: Background and concept of Numbers) Stevens stated: "That's the comical side to the Numbers story, connected to Trezlar (Note: In the story, Trezlar was one of the nine Polygons living on Polygor.), who was responsible for caring for the banapple trees."

The song's lyrics describe banapple gas as a substance that "all the world is stuck on" and "everybody's sniffing". However, "no one knows what's inside it", though the chorus claims that "it must be healthy 'cause it's certified!"

During a live performance of "Banapple Gas" for Stevens's 1976 Majikat tour, he gave the song the following introduction:

"Alright, I'd like to introduce you now to somebody who's been a close friend and very important associate during my career that nobody has ever ever met, ever. Not even my band. It's very important to me, I really, this is the first time I think it's really right that you get to meet...Mr. Banapple."

== Release and reception ==
The song was released as Numbers' only single on 8 July 1976, with "Ghost Town" as B-side.

In a negative review for Rolling Stone, Paul Nelson called the song "malodorous" and joked that it "may cause severe attacks of dreadful Gibranian diarrhea." Music archivist George Brown noted the song as "upbeat", and that it was "an obvious choice for a single".

== Music video ==
The song was promoted with a music video, which has since been described as "bizarre" by music critic Gareth Branwyn. The video features a yellow-suited Stevens handing out the fictional fruit, or its gas, to various people, as well as selling it in stores.

== Charts ==
Chart (1976)	Peak position
Australia (Kent Music Report)	59
Canada RPM Top Singles	65
Germany	37
Netherlands	7
US Billboard Hot 100	41
