= Alun Davies (guitarist) =

Welsh musician

- Also known as: Daydo
- Born: 27 July 1942 (age 84); Wales
- Genres: Folk rock; folk; pop; jazz; skiffle
- Occupations: Musician; songwriter; vocalist; producer
- Instruments: Guitar, vocals
- Years active: 1963–present
- Labels: Decca; Fontana; Island; A&M; CBS; Polydor; Atlantic

Alun Davies (born 27 July 1942) is a Welsh guitarist, studio musician, recording artist, and composer who rose to fame primarily with his supporting guitar work and backing vocals as accompanist for English musician Cat Stevens from early 1970 to 1978.

Prior to his association with Stevens, Davies co-wrote, sang, and played on two albums: in 1963, with Jon Mark (known then as John Michael Burchell), and in 1968, as a member of the band Sweet Thursday with Mark, keyboardist Nicky Hopkins, Harvey Burns and Brian Odgers, when folk-rock music was still in its infancy. After their label declared bankruptcy, Davies was invited to join Cat Stevens as a session musician, at a time when Stevens was attempting to change his sound and advance in the music world.

Davies' experience, similar tastes in the emerging folk-rock genre, and capabilities with guitar and voice placed him in a pivotal role in Stevens' career, resulting in hit songs and a string of RIAA platinum certified breakthrough albums. Two such albums, Tea for the Tillerman and Teaser and the Firecat, propelled Stevens to stardom and a stellar musical career, and solidified a friendship between the two men. Davies, who recorded Daydo, a solo album, after a few years of backing Stevens, found comparatively little commercial success on his own, particularly after several years of sitting in Stevens' charismatic shadow. He continued to tour with him and recorded on all but one of his albums, until Stevens' conversion to Islam and retirement from the pop scene in 1977. Since that time, many "box sets", compilations, and "best hits" albums have been assembled for sale with Davies' guitar work and vocals on each album.

In late 2006, when Stevens (now known as Yusuf Islam) returned again to write and perform, he did so with the amicable support of his friend and long-time right-hand man Davies, although nearly three decades had passed, and the two men had followed extremely different paths during the interim. Davies continues to perform with Yusuf to the present day, in addition to pursuing other musical projects. Though he played on Yusuf's first comeback record (An Other Cup, 2006), he did not appear on Yusuf's record Roadsinger (2009).

== Early musical career ==
Alun Davies began his musical career playing skiffle music on a ukulele and then a "very cheap" acoustic guitar. Eventually, he advanced, and met up with former schoolfriend Michael Burchell, who later assumed the stage name of Jon Mark. The two young men composed and performed songs together, and by 1963, just two years out of school, had been signed by Decca Records. They recorded their first album, Relax Your Mind, in one day with American producer Shel Talmy, who had worked with bands that include the Who, Chad and Jeremy, the Kinks, Manfred Mann, and Ralph McTell. The two set about busking in Europe and located an agent who found them a position performing on a Cunard Line ship, sailing sixteen times across the Atlantic. After a time, the two had enough of sailing. Davies was content playing as a session musician for Fontana Records, touring with some musicians of note including Spencer Davis. Davies was additionally recruited as a record producer for a folk album by Jeremy Taylor, with whom Davies guested on two songs.

=== Sweet Thursday ===
Davies and Mark reunited in 1968, forming a band with Nicky Hopkins as keyboardist, bass guitarist Brian Odgers, and drummer Harvey Burns, under the name Sweet Thursday. The eponymous album that resulted was released, but never had a chance with the public. Their American record label, Tetragrammaton Records, abruptly declared bankruptcy (by legend, the same day the album was released), and the musicians never had the opportunity to perform their new material on stage or promote the album.

Davies returned to session work in the music industry. For a time, Davies played in folk clubs, one being the "hub" of folk music in London, the Cecil Sharp House. He also gave guitar lessons to support himself. "I began concentrating more on my guitar playing. I then found there was a lot of session work available for a fingerstyle acoustic player", he said to Beat Instrumental Magazine. He continued to write new material of his own, with hopes of a solo album in the future.

== With Cat Stevens ==
Davies was first recruited to work with Cat Stevens in early 1970, by Stevens' producer, Paul Samwell-Smith. He was considered a perfect complement to Stevens' new, folk-rock based approach to music, and the combination clicked. Initially hired as a session musician on the album Mona Bone Jakon, Davies' more experienced guitar finger-work and backing vocals helped Stevens achieve his new sound. He had a hit single from the album with the song "Lady D'Arbanville", a madrigal-sounding song written about Stevens' girlfriend at the time, which ultimately reached No. 8 on the pop charts in the United Kingdom, and is credited as the first Cat Stevens song to gain attention in the United States. The song and the album laid the groundwork for Stevens' most productive albums to come. Davies had developed a love for the emerging folk-rock sound, as had Stevens. After they completed Mona Bone Jakon, within six weeks' time they had already begun to work on Tea for the Tillerman.

=== Wooing the American audience ===
As his accompanist on Stevens' first tour of the United States, Davies said that the two experienced some stage fright, upon hearing that they'd be opening for Steve Winwood's band, Traffic, at the Fillmore East. However, the concert was a hit, and had three standing ovations, bolstering both the confidence of the band and the sales of Stevens' albums. Working alongside Stevens, Davies was a partner in catapulting Stevens into world fame. Within a short time, Davies was regarded by astute fans as a perfectionist, arriving before Stevens at each concert to personally check out both the sound and instruments after the sound checks, and practising the material until he was satisfied that the audience would receive the best concert available. Such touches kept him as a member of Stevens' artistic team. Tea for the Tillerman and Teaser and the Firecat both were platinum albums in the United States, and each produced top charting singles. Lauded as Stevens' right-hand man, Davies put off his dreams of solo albums because he insisted that Stevens' work was more essential, and he remained loyal to him, saying he would eventually find time for his own project.

In 1972, Davies at last found the time and opportunity to launch his own solo album. Daydo was released in 1972, containing songs written or co-written by Davies, and supported by Stevens on piano with other members of Cat Stevens' band, including drummer Gerry Conway. "Daydo" was Davies' nickname until age 18. The album was produced by Stevens and Paul Samwell-Smith. The solo effort received mixed reviews.

=== Reaction to Stevens' conversion ===
After Cat Stevens left the pop music business, Davies confessed to feeling quite sad. He stated that after being so fortunate to have attached himself to a "major talent" for so long that there was a period of time that he mourned, as did quite a few others. Davies commented that he had not expected this major change in Stevens, since Stevens' search for spiritual fulfilment had led him to experiment with a number of religions, including Numerology, Buddhism and I-Ching. Stevens' mother was a Swedish Baptist, and father, a Greek Cypriot who was Greek Orthodox, and Stevens had attended a Catholic school. Thus, Davies said in an interview that covered Cat Stevens' career on the VH1 series, Behind the Music, that he thought he was merely going through another phase up until the last month or so.

== 1977 to 2005 ==
Davies then moved on to session work again and soon was composing songs and performing with vocalist Ronnie Lane who was an old friend and former member of the English bands the Faces and the Small Faces. Together, the two wrote and recorded the opening track for Lane's album See Me, as well as "One Step", and another tune, "She's Leaving", in 1979.

== Later work ==
With the re-emergence of Yusuf Islam onstage, Davies has spent the majority of his time performing and recording with him. Davies also performs with the group Good Men in the Jungle with his former bandmate from their Cat Stevens days, drummer Gerry Conway. Others in this band include Davies' daughter, Becky Moncurr.

== Discography ==
=== Alun Davies discography ===
Year	Album	Musicians	Label	Supporting Musicians
1963	Relax Your Mind	Alun Davies; Jon Mark	Decca Records; LK 4547	Arthur Watts (bass); Big Jim Sullivan (guitar); Judd Proctor (banjo, guitar)
1968	Sweet Thursday	Alun Davies; Jon Mark; Nicky Hopkins	Fontana Records/Tetragrammaton Records	Harvey Burns; Brian Odgers
1972	Daydo	Alun Davies	CBS Records	Cat Stevens (Piano, Guitar, backing vocals); Gerry Conway (drums, percussion); Nicky Hopkins(bass); Jean Roussel (keyboards, organ, backing vocals)

=== Daydo ===
Alun Davies' only solo album is Daydo, released in 1972. Much of the material was written as early as 1970, but this was just prior to Davies' introduction, backup work, and devoted friendship with Cat Stevens. With the intention of releasing the material as soon as possible, Davies bemoaned the fact that he had so little time to debut his own work, but stated that he had no regrets. The LP at last was released in the summer of 1972. Liner notes for the LP were written by Jon Mark, of Sweet Thursday and the Mark-Almond Band. Daydo peaked at number 43 in Australia.

=== With Cat Stevens ===
- 1970 Mona Bone Jakon
- 1970 Tea for the Tillerman
- 1971 Teaser and the Firecat
- 1972 Catch Bull at Four
- 1974 Buddha and the Chocolate Box
- 1974 Saturnight
- 1975 Numbers (1975)
- 1976 Majikat - released in 2004
- 1978 Back to Earth

==== With Stevens as Yusuf Islam ====
- 2006 An Other Cup
- 2007 Yusuf's Cafe Sessions
- 2017 The Laughing Apple
- 2020 Tea for the Tillerman 2

=== With Paul Williams & Friends ===
- Paul Williams & Friends: In Memory of Robert Johnson (1973) (associated artists) "Terraplane Blues".

=== With Mark-Almond ===
- 1973 73

=== Other collaborations ===
- 1975 Say It Ain't So – Murray Head – Acoustic Guitar on Say It Ain't So, Boats Away, and Never Even Thought
- 1979 See Me with Ronnie Lane
- 2004 Entre La jeunesse et la sagesse as supporting guitarist with Kate and Anna McGarrigle
