= Teaser and the Firecat =

Studio album by Cat Stevens
- Released: 1 October 1971
- Recorded: July 1970 – March 1971
- Studios: Paramount, Los Angeles; Morgan, London
- Genre: Folk-pop
- Length: 32:39
- Labels: Island (UK/Europe); A&M (US/Canada)
- Producer: Paul Samwell-Smith

Cat Stevens chronology
Tea for the Tillerman (1970)	Teaser and the Firecat (1971)	Very Young and Early Songs (1971)

Singles from Teaser and the Firecat
- 1. "Moonshadow" Released: September 1970 (UK) June 1971 (US); 2. "Peace Train" Released: 1971 (worldwide) September 1971 (US); 3. "Ruby Love" Released: 1971 (FR, DE, ES, GR, Benelux); 4. "Morning Has Broken" Released: 1972

Teaser and the Firecat is the fifth studio album by Cat Stevens, released in October 1971. It was recorded between July 1970 and March 1971, and features 10 songs, including the hits "Morning Has Broken", "Moonshadow" and "Peace Train". The album was a commercial success, surpassing the heights achieved by Stevens' previous album, Tea for the Tillerman, reaching both the UK and US top 3 and also spending fifteen weeks at the top of the Australian charts, becoming the biggest-selling album of the country in 1972 and winning Biggest Selling LP at the 1972 King of Pop Awards. It also shares a title with a children's book written and illustrated by Stevens, which focuses on the characters from the album cover.

== Overview ==
Stevens wrote and illustrated a 1972 children's book which features the titular characters from the album cover, top-hatted young Teaser and his pet, Firecat, who attempt to put the moon back in its place after it falls from the sky. The book has been out of print and rare since the mid-1970s.

In 1977 an animated short narrated by comedian Spike Milligan featuring Teaser and his Firecat, as well as the hit "Moonshadow", was released as a segment in Fantastic Animation Festival.

In November 2008, a deluxe edition was released featuring a second disc of demos and live recordings.

English keyboardist Rick Wakeman played piano on "Morning Has Broken" and English musician Linda Lewis contributed vocals on "How Can I Tell You".

== Critical reception ==
Professional ratings
Review scores
Source	Rating
AllMusic	5/5 stars

In a contemporary review for Rolling Stone magazine, music critic Timothy Crouse praised Stevens' distinctive musical style and introspective songs such as "Tuesday's Dead" and "The Wind", but felt that he lacks Van Morrison's evocative quality and James Taylor's refined lyrics: "Cat has become a dependable artist, a good artist, but he appears to be one of those composers who does not develop, who holds no surprises." Croiuse described the singles "Ruby Love" and "Peace Train" as being "infectious but basically dreck" and attributed their success to their production values, although he acknowledged that "Rubylove" "as a pleasant enough tune" and that "Peace Train" "delivers its simple-minded message in an appropriately childish tone." On the other hand, he wrote of the single "Moonshadow" that it's "a simple, unadorned song whose beauty lies in its mystery" and said that "Morning Is Broken" is "the only lyric on the album that makes a really sophisticated, coherent statement about the world", describing that song as "a gorgeous hymn."

In a retrospective five-star review, AllMusic's William Ruhlmann found the album more simplistic lyrically and musically entertaining than Tea for the Tillerman (1970): "Teaser and the Firecat was the Cat Stevens album that gave more surface pleasures to more people, which in pop music is the name of the game." It was voted number 539 in the third edition of Colin Larkin's All Time Top 1000 Albums (2000).

Musicologist Franco Fabbri described "Rubylove" as "the first notable English pop song with 'Mediterranean' flavor that doesn't sound Arabic" and also as "the first 'exotic' song related to a nation, a culture, that wasn't part of the British Empire.

== Track listing ==
All tracks are written by Cat Stevens, except "Morning Has Broken" (traditional; arranged and adapted by Stevens with additional lyrics by Eleanor Farjeon).

Side one
No.	Title	Length
1.	"The Wind"	1:42
2.	"Rubylove"	2:37
3.	"If I Laugh"	3:20
4.	"Changes IV"	3:32
5.	"How Can I Tell You"	4:24

Side two
No.	Title	Length
6.	"Tuesday's Dead"	3:36
7.	"Morning Has Broken"	3:20
8.	"Bitterblue"	3:12
9.	"Moonshadow"	2:52
10.	"Peace Train"	4:04

== Personnel ==
- Guitar: Alun Davies, Cat Stevens
- Bouzouki: Angelos Hatzipavli, Andreas Toumazis
- Bass: Larry Steele
- Keyboards: Jean Alain Roussel, Cat Stevens, Rick Wakeman
- Drums: Harvey Burns, Gerry Conway
- Percussion: Paul Samwell-Smith, Larry Steele
- Strings: Del Newman
- Backing Vocals: Alun Davies, Linda Lewis, Paul Samwell-Smith, Larry Steele

== Charts ==
=== Weekly charts ===
Chart (1971–1972)	Peak position
Australia (Kent Music Report)	1
UK Albums Chart (Official Charts Company)	2
US Billboard 200	2

Chart (2021)	Peak position
Swiss Albums (Schweizer Hitparade)	67

=== Year-end charts ===
Chart (1972)	Position
German Albums (Offizielle Top 100)	33

== Certifications ==
Region	Certification	Certified units/sales
France (SNEP)	Gold	100,000^{*}
Germany (BVMI)	Platinum	500,000^{^}
Switzerland (IFPI Switzerland)	Platinum	50,000^{^}
United Kingdom (BPI)	Gold	100,000^{^}
United States (RIAA)	3× Platinum	3,000,000^{^}
^{*} Sales figures based on certification alone.^{^} Shipments figures based on certification alone.
