= Suzanne Lynch =

New Zealand singer

Suzanne Lynch MNZM
- Birth name: Suzanne Joy Donaldson
- Also known as: Suzanne Donaldson, Sue Lynch, Suzanne
- Born: 11 December 1950 (age 74)
- Origin: New Zealand
- Genres: Pop
- Occupation: Singer
- Years active: 1967–present
- Website: "Suzanne" Official website

Suzanne Joy Lynch MNZM (née Donaldson, born 11 December 1950) is a New Zealand singer who has worked professionally under the names Suzanne Donaldson, Suzanne Lynch and Suzanne.

== Career ==
Lynch first came to wide public knowledge in the 1960s as half of the duo The Chicks with her sister, Judy Hindman, on the NZBC television series C'MON. In 1969, she became a solo performer and was a resident performer on the follow-up show Happen Inn. In 1970 she was voted NZ Entertainer of the Year and won a Loxene Golden Disc in 1972.

After marrying fellow entertainer Bruce Lynch she moved to London, England, where she worked as a session musician until she became a regular part of Cat Stevens' vocal group and appeared on several of his albums until he gave up recording after a religious conversion. The first song Lynch did for Stevens was "Oh Very Young" in which she sang the solo and background vocals.

Lynch appeared on the 2008 and 2009 series of Stars in Their Eyes as vocal coach and backup singer.

She is a member of the Lady Killers alongside Tina Cross and Jackie Clarke.

== Discography ==
=== Charting singles ===
List of singles, with Australian chart positions
Year	Title	Peak chart positions	
Year	Title	AUS	NZ
1978	"You've Really Got a Hold On Me "	74	7

== Honours and awards ==
- 1971 NEBOA Entertainer of the year award
- 1972 APRA Golden Disc award
- 1972–73 Gold Disc Award for Success as a singer in NZ and overseas
- 2001 In the 2001 Queen's Birthday Honours, Lynch was appointed a Member of the New Zealand Order of Merit, for services to entertainment.
- 2008 Rock’Ons award for International NZ star
- 2008 Top female artist award
- 2008 Benny Award from the Variety Artists Club of New Zealand Inc, the highest honour available to a variety entertainer in New Zealand.
