= Oh Very Young =

Single by Cat Stevens

from the album Buddha and the Chocolate Box
- B-side: "100 I Dream"
- Released: March 1974
- Recorded: February 1974
- Genre: Folk rock, pop rock
- Length: 2:39
- Label: Island (UK/Europe); A&M (US/Canada)
- Songwriter: Cat Stevens
- Producers: Paul Samwell-Smith, Cat Stevens

Cat Stevens singles chronology
"The Hurt" (1973)	"Oh Very Young" (1974)	"Another Saturday Night" (1974)

Professional ratings
Review scores
Source	Rating
All Music Guide	link

"Oh Very Young" is a song composed by Cat Stevens. It was released on his 1974 album Buddha and the Chocolate Box, as well as several later "Best of..." and "Greatest Hits" albums. The song reached number 10 on the US Billboard Hot 100 and number two on the Easy Listening chart. It spent 15 weeks in the Australian KMR Top-100 chart, peaking at #19 after entering on 13th May 1974.

== Background ==
According to Stevens's producer, Paul Samwell-Smith, the song was written for Smith's son Nicholas. Stevens himself called the song "very optimistic", having written it in a happy mood.

== Charts ==
Chart (1974)	Peak position
Australia	19
New Zealand (Listener)	10
US Billboard Hot 100	10
US Billboard Easy Listening	2

== In popular culture ==
- The song was featured in the 2025 film adaptation of The Thursday Murder Club.
