= And Also the Trees =

English post-punk and gothic rock band

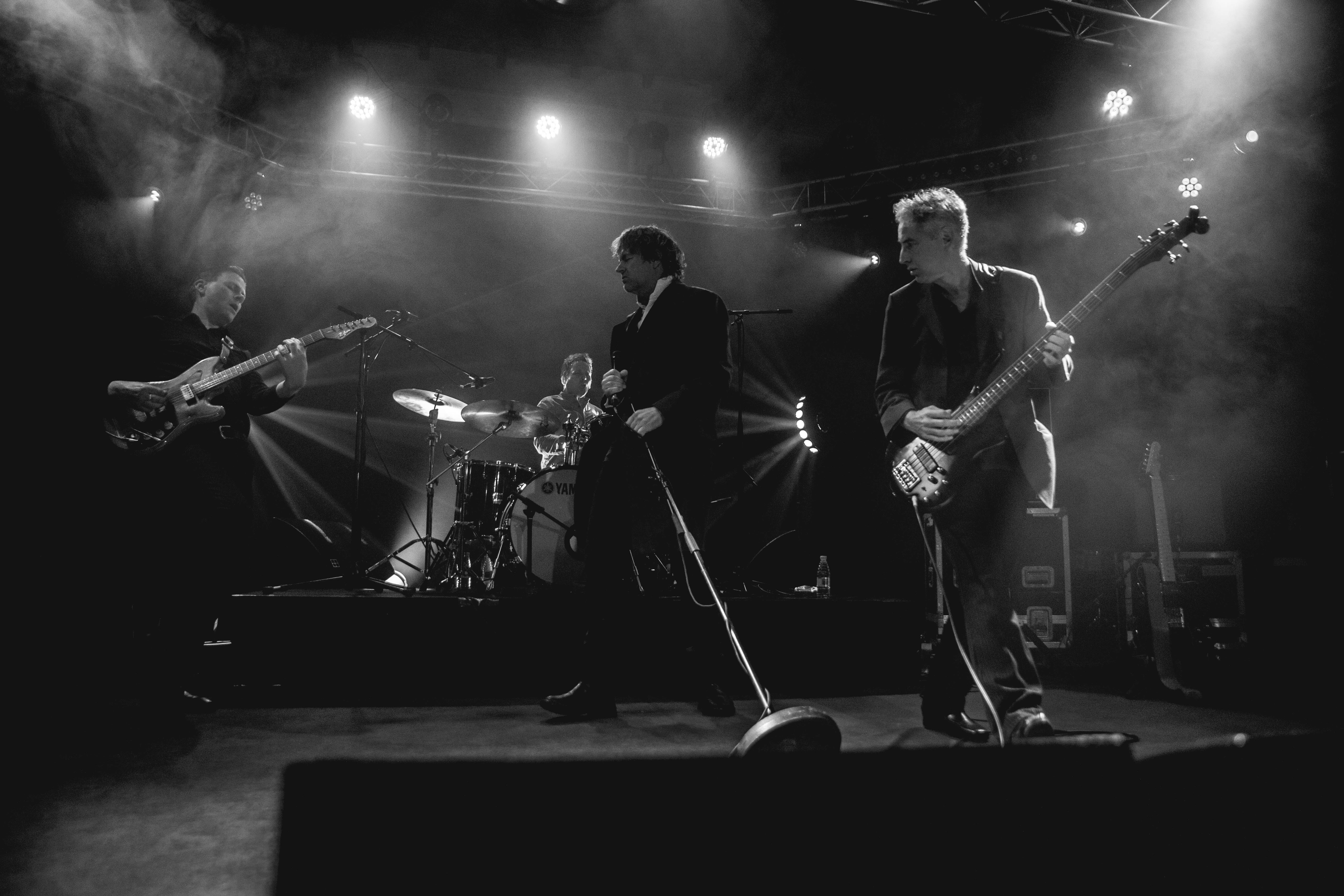
- And Also the Trees live at Les Abattoirs, Cognac, France on November 23, 2019

Background information
- Origin: Inkberrow, Worcestershire, England
- Genres: Gothic rock; post-punk
- Years active: 1979–present
- Members: Justin Jones; Simon Huw Jones; Paul Hill; Colin Ozanne; Grant Gordon
- Past members: Graham Havas; Nick Havas; Steven Burrows; Mark Tibenham; William Waghorn; Dale Hodginson; Ian Jenkins; Emer Brizzolara
- Website: http://www.andalsothetrees.co.uk/

And Also the Trees are an English rock band, formed in 1979 in Inkberrow, Worcestershire. They are characterised by their poetic lyrics and evocative music which are strongly influenced by the native English countryside.

== History ==
And Also the Trees formed in 1979 in Inkberrow, Worcestershire, with a lineup featuring two sets of brothers: Simon Huw Jones (vocals), Justin Jones (guitar), Graham Havas (bass) and Nick Havas (drums).

=== 1980s ===
The band made their live debut on 12 January 1980 at Grieg Memorial Hall in Alcester. A home demo tape was sent to The Cure, who were looking for support bands on their tour, leading to a friendship between the two bands. In 1981, And Also the Trees played several shows in support of The Cure's UK tour. Their second demo tape, From Under the Hill (1982), was partly co-produced by Robert Smith and Mike Hedges. Graham Havas was replaced at this time by Steven Burrows.

In 1983, the band released their first single, "Shantell", which was produced by The Cure's Lol Tolhurst. Their second single, "The Secret Sea", followed in 1984 and was also produced by Tolhurst. Tolhurst also produced their debut studio album, And Also the Trees, which was released in February 1984. The band received the attention of BBC Radio 1 DJ John Peel, and were invited to do a session in April 1984, which was produced by Dale Griffin for broadcast on 24 April.

The EP A Room Lives in Lucy (1985) introduced the mandolin-like guitar sound which became their trademark for the next few years. It gave the band their only placing on the UK Independent Chart, peaking at number 30. The next album, Virus Meadow (1986), was followed by their first European tour, which yielded the live album The Evening of the 24th (1987). Another EP, The Critical Distance, was released in 1987. The singles "Shaletown" and "The House of the Heart", and the next album The Millpond Years (1988) were produced by Mark Tibenham.

Farewell to the Shade (1989) was followed by the single releases of "Lady D'Arbanville" (a completely revised Cat Stevens cover) and the French-only "Misfortunes".

=== 1990s ===
In 1990, they changed their management. The band toured America during the following year, and reactivated contact with the Cure, which resulted in the USA-only release of the EP The Pear Tree featuring a remix by Robert Smith and Mark Saunders.

In 1992, the band released their last album produced by Tibenham, Green Is the Sea. They promoted it with a two-leg European tour including Belgium, Germany, Switzerland and France. Fan pressure resulted in a digital remastering of their singles and EPs, and the release of From Horizon to Horizon, a CD collection of primarily single and non-album tracks between 1983 and 1992.

They issued their sixth studio album The Klaxon in 1993, and the band toured during the following year, which resulted in the release of the live album Le Bataclan and a tour video from a concert in Hamburg.

In 1995, Justin Jones and Tibenham, along with Antonia Reiner, collaborated on a project called G. O. L., which resulted in the release of the album Sensations of Tone and the single "Soma Holiday". The album featured a cover version of the early And Also The Trees song "There Were No Bounds".

The band's seventh studio album, Angelfish (1996), centred on a British perception of Americana. It was the last album with drummer Nick Havas, who was replaced by Paul Hill.

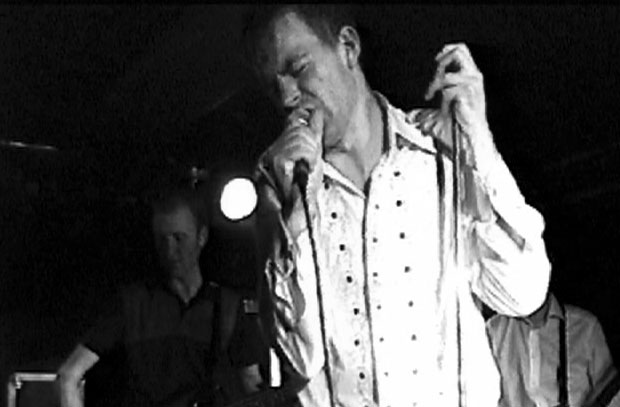
And Also the Trees live in Dortmund, Germany in 1998

Their eighth studio album, Silver Soul (1998), was also the band's first release on their own record label. The band released an EP, Nailed, the same year as well as a video compilation, Live 89-98. On the 23 April 1998 the band played their first UK date in seven years at the Axiom Arts Centre in Cheltenham.

=== 2000s ===
After a five-year break, And Also the Trees released Further from the Truth (2003), recorded in the Worcestershire countryside and co-produced with Matthew Devenish.

In 2004 and 2005, And Also the Trees played several shows at music festivals such as the Paleo Festival and Wave-Gotik-Treffen in Germany. They celebrated their 25th anniversary with the Best of 1980–2005 compilation album.

Live in Geneva (2006) showed the band in action on their Further from the Truth tour, as well as some video and film projects. That same year, Simon Huw Jones collaborated with Bernard Trontin of the Young Gods for a project called November, releasing an eponymous album on Swiss label Shayo.

And Also the Trees' 10th album, (Listen For) The Rag and Bone Man, was issued in November 2007. It featured two new members, Ian Jenkins (double bass) and Emer Brizzolara (keyboards, dulcimer and melodica). The accompanying photographs were taken by French photographer Jérôme Sevrette.

In June 2009, the band released When the Rains Come, containing acoustic versions of previously released songs and one new track. This was followed by another acoustic album, titled Driftwood.

=== 2010s ===
In the summer of 2011, the band worked on new material in Herefordshire and France. Later that year, Justin Jones provided guest guitar on the Othon Mataragas album Impermanence (with Marc Almond on vocals, and also featuring Ernesto Tomasini, Laura Moody and Camille O'Sullivan), followed by an intimate concert at London's Chelsea Theatre to launch the album.

The band's 12th studio album, Hunter Not the Hunted, was released in March 2012.

And Also the Trees' 13th album, Born Into the Waves, was released on 18 March 2016. The band's current live lineup also includes Grant Gordon on bass guitar and Colin Ozanne on clarinet, guitar and keyboard.

=== 2020s ===
And Also The Trees followed up "Born Into the Waves" with three further albums in the new decade: The Bone Carver in 2022, Mother-of-Pearl Moon in 2024 and The Devil's Door in 2026.

== Musical style ==
And Also the Trees have been described as a gothic rock group. The band's aesthetic sensibility has also been related to British Romanticism and melancholy in poetry and the arts.

== Band members ==
Current lineup

- Simon Huw Jones – vocals (1979–present)
- Justin Jones – guitar (1979–present)
- Paul Hill – drums (1998–present)
- Colin Ozanne - keyboards, clarinet, guitar (2015–present)
- Grant Gordon - bass guitar (2015–present)

Past members

- Graham Havas – bass guitar (1979–1983)
- Nick Havas – drums (1979–1997)
- Steven Burrows – bass guitar (1983–2007)
- Mark Tibenham - keyboards (1988–1992)
- William Waghorn - trumpet (1994–1998)
- Dale Hodginson - guitar & keyboards (1998)
- Ian Jenkins – bass guitar, double bass (2004–2015)
- Emer Brizzolara - keyboards, dulcimer, melodica (2004–2015)

== Discography ==
=== Albums ===
==== Studio ====
- And Also the Trees (1984)
- Virus Meadow (1986)
- The Millpond Years (1988)
- Farewell to the Shade (1989)
- Green Is the Sea (1992)
- The Klaxon (1993)
- Angelfish (1996)
- Silver Soul (1998)
- Further from the Truth (2003)
- (Listen For) The Rag and Bone Man (2007)
- When the Rains Come (2009)
- Driftwood (2011)
- Hunter Not the Hunted (2012)
- Born Into the Waves (2016)
- The Bone Carver (2022)
- Mother-of-Pearl Moon (2024)
- The Devil's Door (2026)

==== Live ====
- The Evening of the 24th (1987)
- Le Bataclan (1994)
- Prémonition hors série (1991; EP)

==== Compilations ====
- A Retrospective 1983–1986 (1986)
- Et aussi les arbres (1987)
- Boxed Set (1990)
- From Horizon to Horizon (Singles 1983–92) (1993)
- 1980–2005 (2005)

==== Demo albums ====
- First demo cassette (1980)
- From Under the Hill (1982)

=== EPs ===
- The Secret Sea (1984)
- A Room Lives in Lucy (1985)
- The Critical Distance (1987)
- Shaletown (1987)
- The House of the Heart (1988)
- Lady D'Arbanville (1989)
- The Pear Tree (1991)
- Nailed (1998)
- And Also the Trees (2009)
- And Also the Trees (2014)

=== Singles ===
- "Shantell"/"Wallpaper Dying" (1983)
- "The Secret Sea"/"Secrecy" (1984)
- "Shaletown"/"Needle Street" (1987)
- "The House of the Heart"/"This Ship in Trouble (Instrumental)" (1988)
- "Lady D'Arbanville"/"The Street Organ" (1989)
- "Misfortunes"/"Belief in the Rose (Instrumental)" (1989)

=== Video releases ===
- Bielefeld PC69 May 1st 1992 (1994)
- Live 89-98 (1998)
- Live in Geneva (2006)
