= Camille O'Sullivan discography =

- Studio albums: 2
- Extended plays: 1
- Live albums: 4
- Singles: 1
- Video albums: 2
- Music videos: 2
- Miscellaneous: 3

The discography of Camille O'Sullivan, an Irish musician, consists of two studio albums, four live albums, one extended play, one single, two video albums and two music videos.

== Albums ==
=== Studio albums ===
Year	Album details	Chart positions	
Year	Album details	IRL	IRL Indie
2002	A Little Yearning: Released: 2002; Label: Cat-O-Stripes (01); Format: CD	—	—
2012	Changeling: Released: 4 February 2012; Label: Little Cat (01); Format: CD, digital download	45	6
"—" denotes a release that did not chart.

=== Live albums ===
Year	Album details
2005	La Fille Du Cirque: Released: 2005; Label: Cat-O-Stripes; Format: CD
2005	Plays Brel Live: Released: 2005; Label: Cat-O-Stripes; Format: CD
2008	Live at the Olympia: Released: 5 December 2008; Label: RMG; Format: CD, digital download
2019	Camille sings Cave Live: Released: 1 November 2019; Label: Format: CD, digital download

== Extended plays ==
Year	Album details
2007	EP Four Songs: Released: 13 January 2007; Label: Cat-O-Stripes; Format: CD, digital download

== Singles ==
Year	Title	Album
2012	"Revelator"	Changeling

== Video albums ==
Year	Album details
2005	La Fille Du Cirque: Released: 2005; Label: Cat-O-Stripes; Format: DVD
2008	Live at the Olympia: Released: 5 December 2008; Label: RMG; Format: DVD

== Music videos ==
Year	Title	Director	Ref
2008	"The Ship Song"	Feenish Productions	
2010	"(Are You) The One That I've Been Waiting For?"	Feenish Productions	

== Miscellaneous appearances ==
Year	Song(s)	Album	Artist	Notes	Ref
2002	"Ces Gens La" "Plain Gold Ring"	Nine Parts Devil	Black Romantics	Performed vocals on Jacques Brel and Earl S. Burroughs covers.	
2010	"Sweet Forgetfulness"	The Life of Birds	David Rotheray	Performed vocals.	
2011	"A Trip to Paradise"	Impermanence	Othon	Performed vocals.	
