= The Millpond Years =

Studio album by And Also the Trees
- Released: 1988
- Recorded: February 1988 at The Abattoir, Birmingham, England
- Genre: Post-punk, gothic rock
- Label: Reflex
- Producer: And Also the Trees, Richard Waghorn

And Also the Trees chronology
The Evening of the 24th (1987)	The Millpond Years (1988)	Farewell to the Shade (1989)

Professional ratings
Review scores
Source	Rating
AllMusic	4/5 stars

The Millpond Years is the third studio album by English band And Also the Trees.

== Background ==
The Millpond Years was recorded in February 1988 at The Abattoir in Birmingham, England.

== Track listing ==
No.	Title	Length
1.	"The Suffering of the Stream"	3:38
2.	"Simple Tom and the Ghost of Jenny Bailey"	4:32
3.	"The House of the Heart"	3:03
4.	"This Ship in Trouble"	3:20
5.	"Count Jefferey"	6:16
6.	"Shaletown"	4:11
7.	"The Sandstone Man"	4:49
8.	"From the Silver Frost"	5:22
9.	"The Millpond Years"	4:45
10.	"Needle Street"	4:45
11.	"L'unica strada"	3:07

== Personnel ==
- Simon Huw Jones – vocals, other instruments
- Justin Jones – guitar, other instruments
- Steven Burrows – bass guitar, other instruments
- Nick Havas – drums, other instruments
- Mark Tibenham – additional keyboards, other instruments
