= Inkberrow =

Village in Worcestershire, England

Coordinates: 52.213°N 1.981°W

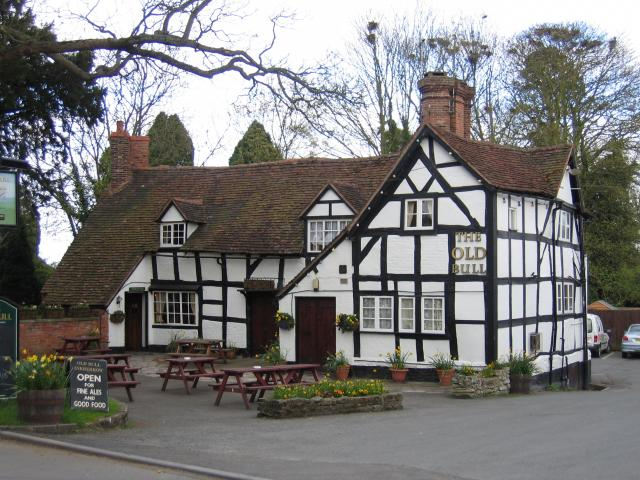
- The Old Bull

- Location within Worcestershire
- OS grid reference: SP014572
- District: Redditch and Wychavon
- Shire county: Worcestershire
- Region: West Midlands
- Country: England
- Sovereign state: United Kingdom
- Post town: WORCESTER
- Postcode district: WR7
- Dialling code: 01386
- Police: West Mercia
- Fire: Hereford and Worcester
- Ambulance: West Midlands
- UK Parliament: Redditch

Inkberrow is a village in Worcestershire, England. In 2001, it had a population of 5,308, and 2,170 households.

== History ==
The earliest recorded version of the village is Intanbeorgas, "Inta's mounds or barrows", from 789. By the 15th century, the spelling may have become Ingtebarwe; nearby villages also mentioned include Church Lench, Abbots Morton and Arrow. By the 16th century, it was known as Inkebarrow.

The area was within Feckenham Forest, a royal forest with harsh forest law punishments.

Cookhill Priory stood 3 mi (4.8 km) to the east, at the edge of the county.

In 2006 Inkberrow was awarded the title of Worcestershire Village of the Year and won the Building Community Life section of the competition.

Inkberrow was identified as a potential site for a new town in the 1960s, but this plan was not carried out. 275 properties were built in the village between 1969 and 1972. More houses were built in the village in 2013. In 2016, 100 new houses were built by Bovis Homes.

Inkberrow Millennium Green is an eight-acre public open space to the east of the village, opened in 2000, which includes a medieval moat and fishpond, a variety of wildflowers and fruit trees, and a millennium seat with extensive views.

In 2024, The Daily Telegraph reported that a "class war" was taking place in the village. There was disagreement over plans to increase seating at the local football ground. The reporter said that "There are also fears that more developments will follow, and that Inkberrow may one day lose its village status and become a small town".

== The Archers connection ==
The village is often thought to be the model for Ambridge, the fictional setting of BBC Radio 4's long-running series The Archers. In particular, the Bull, the fictional Ambridge pub, is supposed to be based on the Old Bull in Inkberrow. Coachloads of fans sometimes visit the village. The local health centre is called Grey Gables after a property in the programme. In 2006, when the programme had a storyline in which Ruth Archer contemplated infidelity, a local councillor said "We used to be honoured by our connection with The Archers, but now I have to admit it's more of an embarrassment ... We feel we've been labelled with an association to a world that has become rather dramatic and extreme". The local publican said "anyone who thinks people don't get up to naughty stuff in villages wants to come and spend a few days here".

Other villages have been suggested as the original site of Ambridge, such as Rippingale, Lincolnshire, and Cutnall Green, Worcestershire.

== St Peter's church ==
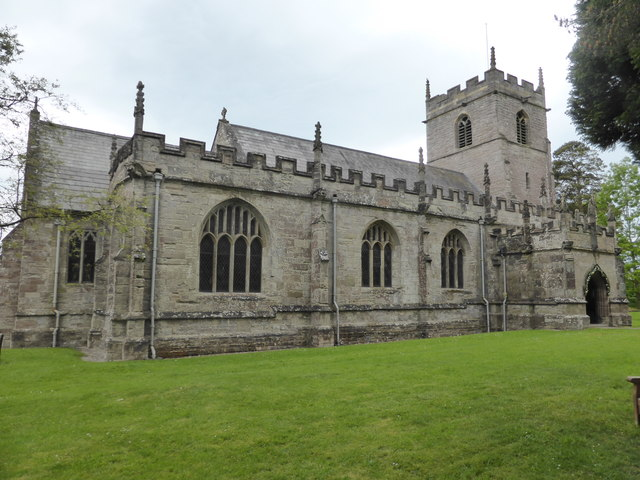
St Peter's church

The village's parish church is dedicated to St. Peter and contains the Savage family chapel. It is a Grade I listed building. The Domesday Book mentions a church in Inkberrow in Saxon times. It is believed that a minster existed as early as 700 AD. The current church is thought to have been built on the site of the minster, and also perhaps a 12th-century wood and earthwork castle destroyed by Henry III in 1233. The current church probably dates from the 13th century, and was not built on the site of the original church.

The baptismal font dates from around 1200 AD, and is typical of the late Norman style. In 1839 it was cleaned and moved near the pulpit, under the arch linking the chancel to the south transept. It was moved again in 1887 to its current position opposite the south door of the nave.

The church is part of the benefice of Inkberrow with Cookhill and Kington-with-Dormston and the Priest-in-charge is Revd. Ian Perry.

== Sport ==
The village has junior and adult football clubs with large memberships when compared to those of more populous towns and villages. Sporting Club Inkberrow play in the Southern League Division One South, and have two 11 a-side pitches and a mini soccer pitch.

There is also a tennis club, with a clubhouse near the village hall.

== Notable residents ==
Former residents, brothers Justin Jones (guitar) and Simon Huw Jones (vocals), formed the post-punk band And Also the Trees in the village in 1979.

The village has a large Christmas tree which has been a local attraction for many years. The tree, planted in 1978, is just over 50 ft (15 m) tall and needs more than 1,000 lights to decorate it. In 2023, it raised over £1,000 for a local charity.

== See also ==
- Inkberrow Castle
