= Virus Meadow =

Album by And Also the Trees

Studio album by And Also the Trees
- Released: 1986
- Recorded: 1985–1986 at Rich Mixture
- Genre: Post-punk, gothic rock
- Label: Reflex
- Producer: And Also the Trees, Mel Jefferson, Richard Waghorn

And Also the Trees chronology
And Also the Trees (1984)	Virus Meadow (1986)	The Evening of the 24th (1987)

Professional ratings
Review scores
Source	Rating
AllMusic	4/5 stars

Virus Meadow is the second studio album by English band And Also the Trees. It was released in 1986, through record label Reflex.

== Track listing ==
Side A
No.	Title	Length
1.	"Slow Pulse Boy"	5:13
2.	"Maps in Her Wrists and Arms"	4:20
3.	"The Dwelling Place"	2:19
4.	"Vincent Craine"	6:24

Side B
No.	Title	Length
1.	"Jack"	4:37
2.	"The Headless Clay Woman"	5:27
3.	"Gone.....Like the Swallows"	4:16
4.	"Virus Meadow"	4:53

== Personnel ==
- Simon Huw Jones – vocals
- Justin Jones – guitar
- Steven Burrows – bass guitar
- Nick Havas – drums
