= And Also the Trees (album) =

Studio album by And Also the Trees
- Released: February 1984
- Recorded: September 1983 at Southern Studios, London, England
- Genre: Gothic rock; post-punk
- Length: 30:09
- Label: Reflex
- Producer: Lol Tolhurst

And Also the Trees chronology
And Also the Trees (1984)	Virus Meadow (1986)

And Also the Trees is the debut studio album by English post-punk band And Also the Trees. It was released in February 1984 by record label Reflex.

== Background ==
The album was recorded in September 1983 and produced by the Cure's Lol Tolhurst. Their sound stood out from that of their gothic rock peers, as it was greatly influenced by the rural surroundings of Worcestershire (the band's place of origin), poetry (on the lyrical side) and Old England. John Peel described their sound as being "too English for the English".

"And Also the Trees" was released in February 1984. It was reissued in 1992 on the German label Normal Records. In August 2020, the band re-released their debut album on Bandcamp, now digitally remastered, including songs off of their 'From Under The Hill' demo (previously released on cassette only in late 1981 and mixed by Robert Smith of The Cure) and contains singles "Shantell" (1983) and "The Secret Sea" (1984) from that period.

== Reception ==
Professional ratings
Review scores
Source	Rating
AllMusic	3/5 stars

AllMusic wrote, "While lacking in immediately catchy songs – partially due to the fact that at this point the band generally favoured series of verses or poetry without rhyme to more conventional lyric structures – the album still kicks up some smoke".

== Track listing ==
Side A
No.	Title	Length
1.	"So This Is Silence"	3:10
2.	"Talk Without Words"	3:19
3.	"Midnight Garden"	4:33
4.	"The Tease the Tear"	2:53

Side B
No.	Title	Length
1.	"Impulse of Man"	4:44
2.	"Shrine"	3:38
3.	"Twilights Pool"	4:38
4.	"Out of the Moving Life of Circles"	4:06

== Personnel ==
- Simon Huw Jones – vocals
- Justin Jones – guitar
- Steven Burrows – bass guitar
- Nick Havas – drums

Technical

- Laurence Tolhurst – production
- David Motion – engineering
