= Harold and Maude =

1971 film by Hal Ashby

- Theatrical release poster
- Directed by: Hal Ashby
- Written by: Colin Higgins
- Produced by: Colin Higgins; Charles B. Mulvehill
- Starring: Ruth Gordon; Bud Cort; Vivian Pickles; Cyril Cusack; Charles Tyner; Ellen Geer
- Cinematography: John Alonzo
- Edited by: William A. Sawyer
- Music by: Cat Stevens
- Production companies: Mildred Lewis and Colin Higgins Productions
- Distributed by: Paramount Pictures
- Release date: December 20, 1971 (United States)
- Running time: 91 minutes
- Country: United States
- Language: English
- Budget: $1.2 million (est.)

Harold and Maude is a 1971 American romantic black comedy-drama film directed by Hal Ashby and released by Paramount Pictures. It incorporates elements of dark humour and existentialist drama. The plot follows the exploits of Harold Chasen (Bud Cort), a young man who is obsessed with death, and who rejects the life his detached mother (Vivian Pickles) prescribes for him. Harold develops a friendship, and eventual romantic relationship, with 79-year-old Maude (Ruth Gordon) who teaches Harold about the importance of living life to its fullest.

The screenplay by Colin Higgins began as his master's thesis for film school. Filming took place in and around San Francisco and San Mateo, California, with locations including both Holy Cross Cemetery and Golden Gate National Cemetery, the ruins of the Sutro Baths, Mori Point, and Rosecourt Mansion in Hillsborough, California.

Critically and commercially unsuccessful when first released, the film eventually developed a cult following, and first made a profit in 1983. The film was selected for preservation in the National Film Registry in 1997, and was ranked number 45 on the American Film Institute list of 100 funniest films of all time in 2000. The Criterion Collection released a special-edition Blu-ray and DVD in 2012.

== Plot ==
Harold Chasen is a young man obsessed with death. He stages elaborate fake suicides, attends funerals (usually for people that he does not know), and drives a hearse, all to the chagrin of his self-obsessed, wealthy socialite mother. His mother sends Harold to a psychoanalyst, sets him up with blind dates, and buys him a luxury car, all schemes he subverts in his own way.

Harold meets 79-year-old Maude one day while at a random stranger's funeral Mass, and discovers that they share a hobby. Harold is entranced by Maude's quirky outlook on life, which is bright and delightfully carefree in contrast to his morbid demeanor. Maude lives in a decommissioned railroad car and thinks nothing of breaking the law; she is quite skilled at stealing cars and will swiftly uproot an ailing tree in a city sidewalk to replant it in the forest. She and Harold form a bond and Maude shows Harold the pleasures of art and music (including how to play the banjo), and teaches him how to make "the most of his time on earth."

Meanwhile, Harold's mother is determined, against Harold's wishes, to find him a wife. One by one, Harold frightens and horrifies each of his appointed computer dates, by appearing to commit gruesome acts, including self-immolation, self-mutilation, and seppuku. His mother attempts to enlist him in the military by sending Harold to his uncle, who lost an arm serving under General MacArthur in World War II, but Harold deters the recruitment by staging a scene where Maude poses as a pacifist protester and Harold seemingly murders her out of militarist fanaticism.

As Harold and Maude grow closer, their friendship blossoms into a romance. Holding her hand, Harold discovers a number tattooed on her forearm, indicating Maude survived the Nazi death camps. Harold announces that he will marry Maude, resulting in disgusted outbursts from his family, analyst, and priest. Unbeknownst to Harold, Maude has been planning to end her own life on her 80th birthday. (Although she had actually mentioned her plan twice, early on.) Maude's birthday arrives, and Harold throws a surprise party for her. As the pair dance, Maude tells Harold that she "couldn't imagine a lovelier farewell." When Maude reveals that she has taken an overdose of sleeping pills and will be dead by midnight, Harold rushes Maude to the hospital. However, she succumbs to the pill overdose. Devastated after learning of Maude's death, Harold speeds down a country road and sends his Jaguar hearse off a seaside cliff, appearing to have committed suicide. Following the crash, Harold is revealed to be standing calmly atop the cliff, holding his banjo. After gazing down at the wreckage, he plucks the banjo strings and dances away to "If You Want to Sing Out, Sing Out".

== Cast ==
- Ruth Gordon as Dame Marjorie "Maude" Chardin, a 79-year-old free spirit. Maude believes in living each day to the fullest, and "trying something new every day". Her view of life is so joyful that, true to the film's motif, it crosses a blurred, shifting line into a carefree attitude toward death as well. Little is known of her past, though it is revealed that in her youth, she was a radical suffragette who fought off police constables with her umbrella, was once married, lived in pre-war Vienna, and has a Nazi concentration camp tattoo on her arm.
- Bud Cort as Harold Parker Chasen, a young man who is obsessed with death. He drives a hearse, attends funerals of strangers and stages elaborate fake suicides. Through meeting and falling in love with Maude, he discovers joy in living for the first time.
- Vivian Pickles as Mrs. Chasen, Harold's opulently wealthy mother, is controlling, snooty and seemingly incapable of affection. Hoping to force him into respectability, Mrs. Chasen replaces Harold's beloved hearse with a Jaguar E-Type (which he then converts to a miniature hearse), and sets up several blind dates (more accurately, "bride interviews") for her son.
- Cyril Cusack as Glaucus, the sculptor who makes an ice statue of Maude and lends them his tools to transport a tree
- Charles Tyner as General Victor Ball, Harold's uncle who lost an arm in the war and now pulls a hidden cord to make his wire prosthetic "salute". At Mrs. Chasen's request, he attempts to prepare Harold to join the armed forces. The effort is thwarted by a planned stunt in which Harold appears to "kill" Maude.
- Ellen Geer as Sunshine Doré, Harold's third blind date who performs an impromptu rendition of Juliet's death scene after his apparent suicide
- Eric Christmas as the priest
- G. Wood as Harold's psychiatrist
- Judy Engles as Candy Gulf, Harold's first blind date, alarmed when he apparently sets himself on fire
- Shari Summers as Edith Phern, Harold's second blind date, astonished when he apparently cuts off his own hand
- Tom Skerritt (credited as "M. Borman") as the motorcycle officer who twice stops Maude and Harold, ultimately losing his ride to the pair.

Director Hal Ashby appears in an uncredited cameo, seen at a penny arcade watching a model train at the Santa Cruz Beach Boardwalk.

== Production ==
UCLA film school student Colin Higgins wrote Harold and Maude as his master's thesis. While working as producer Edward Lewis's pool boy, Higgins showed the script to Lewis's wife, Mildred. Mildred was so impressed that she got Edward to give it to Stanley Jaffe at Paramount. Higgins sold the script with the understanding that he would direct the film, but he was told he was not ready after tests he shot proved unsatisfactory to the studio heads. Ashby said that he would only commit to directing the film after getting Higgins' blessing, and took Higgins on as a co-producer so he could watch and learn from him on the set. Higgins says he originally thought of the story as a play. It then became a 20-minute thesis while at film school. The film script was turned into a novel and then a play, which ran for several years in Paris.

Ashby felt that the actress portraying Maude should ideally be European and his list of possible actresses included Peggy Ashcroft, Edith Evans, Gladys Cooper, and Celia Johnson, as well as Lotte Lenya, Luise Rainer, Pola Negri, Minta Durfee, and Agatha Christie. Ruth Gordon indicated that in addition, she heard that Edwige Feuillère, Elisabeth Bergner, Mildred Natwick, Mildred Dunnock, and Dorothy Stickney had been considered.

For Harold, in addition to Bud Cort, Ashby considered all promising unknowns, Richard Dreyfuss, Bob Balaban, and John Savage. Also on his list were John Rubinstein, for whom Higgins had written the part, and then-up-and-coming British singer Elton John, whom Ashby had seen live and hoped would also do the music. Ashby offered the part to John, even though John liked the script, he turned it down as he felt it would wrong for him to do. Anne Brebner, the casting director, was almost cast as Harold's mother, when Vivian Pickles was briefly unable to do the role.

Principal photography began in late December 1970 and concluded in mid-March 1971. Filming took place in and around San Francisco and San Mateo, California, including locations such as Holy Cross Cemetery in Colma (Harold catches his first glimpse of Maude at a funeral), St. Thomas Aquinas Church in Palo Alto (the church funeral where Harold first meets Maude), Oyster Point Boulevard in South San Francisco (Maude's railroad car), an abandoned warehouse at the Southern Pacific Railroad Bayshore Yard in Brisbane (Glaucus' studio), Half Moon Bay, Golden Gate National Cemetery in San Bruno, Redwood City (Maude rescues a street tree to be transplanted to the forest), the Dumbarton Bridge (a motorcycle officer pulls over Harold and Maude on their way to replant the tree), Sutro Heights Park (Harold rides in a limousine and walks with Uncle Victor) and the ruins of the Sutro Baths (Maude poses as a protester and later falls through a hole to her apparent death) in San Francisco, the Emeryville mudflats (Harold discovers Maude's concentration camp tattoo), Oakland, the Santa Cruz Beach Boardwalk (amusement park), Peninsula Hospital in Burlingame (Maude is hospitalized), and Mori Point in Pacifica (Harold drives his car off a cliff). For the Chasen mansion, scenes were shot at Rosecourt Mansion in Hillsborough, California. According to Ashby, there were some issues securing the location because Otto Preminger had previously filmed in the Hillsborough area and had antagonized the local residents.

== Novelization ==
A novelization by Higgins was released alongside the film; they differ in several respects, including the film's omission of certain scenes and characters. Other different details include the novel's version of Maude having white hair (unlike Gordon in the film) and introducing herself as "the Countess Mathilde Chardin", a different name and title than used in the film. In the novel, Maude's home is characterized as a "cottage" (unlike the retired railroad car Maude inhabits in the film), and she and Harold briefly interact with Maude's neighbor, Madame Arouet, who is not present in the film. The novel includes an additional scene during the tree-planting expedition where Maude leads Harold in climbing to the top of a very tall pine tree to show him the view over the forest from near its summit.

== Release ==
Harold and Maude was released with a vague, text-only poster and very little marketing. The initial release underperformed at the box office, but it gradually found success in repertory theatres and recouped its costs after several years. Danny Peary, author of the Cult Movies series, referred to the film as "[o]ne of the runaway cult favorites of the seventies" and commented that it "[broke] longevity records in cities like Detroit, Montreal, and most memorably, Minneapolis, where residents actually picketed the Westgate Theater trying to get management to replace the picture after a consecutive three-year run."

=== Home media ===
The Criterion Collection released Harold and Maude for Region 1 on DVD and Blu-ray on June 12, 2012 and will also reissue the Blu-ray and release the 4K Ultra HD Blu-ray on November 3, 2026 after the 2012 releases went out of print. The sets include a collection of audio excerpts of Ashby from January 11, 1972, and of screenwriter Colin Higgins from January 10, 1979, a new video interview with Yusuf/Cat Stevens, a new audio commentary by Ashby biographer Nick Dawson and producer Charles B. Mulvehill, and a booklet which includes a new film essay by Matt Zoller Seitz. Exclusive to the Blu-ray edition are a new digital restoration of the film with an uncompressed monaural soundtrack and an optional remastered uncompressed stereo soundtrack. Other exclusives are a New York Times profile of Gordon from 1971, an interview from 1997 with Cort and cinematographer John Alonzo, and an interview from 2001 with executive producer Mildred Lewis.

Paramount released their Blu-ray as a limited edition release under the Paramount Presents line on December 7, 2021.

== Reception ==
=== Critical response ===
At the time of its release, Harold and Maude received mixed reviews, with several critics being offended by the film's dark humor. Roger Ebert gave the film one-and-a-half out of four stars. He wrote, "And so what we get, finally, is a movie of attitudes. Harold is death, Maude life, and they manage to make the two seem so similar that life's hardly worth the extra bother. The visual style makes everyone look fresh from the Wax Museum, and all the movie lacks is a lot of day-old gardenias and lilies and roses in the lobby, filling the place with a cloying sweet smell. Nothing more to report today. Harold doesn't even make pallbearer."

Vincent Canby of The New York Times also panned the film, stating that the actors "are so aggressive, so creepy and off-putting, that Harold and Maude are obviously made for each other, a point the movie itself refuses to recognize with a twist ending that betrays, I think, its life-affirming pretensions."

=== Retrospective appraisal ===
The reputation of the film has since increased greatly. On the review aggregator website Rotten Tomatoes, the film holds an approval rating of 86% based on 50 reviews, with an average rating of 7.8/10. The website's critics consensus reads, "Hal Ashby's comedy is too dark and twisted for some, and occasionally oversteps its bounds, but there's no denying the film's warm humor and big heart."

In 2006, the Writers Guild of America ranked the screenplay number 86 on its list of the "101 Greatest Screenplays" ever written.

In Sight & Sound's 2012 "Greatest Films of All Time" poll, Niki Caro, Wanuri Kahiu, and Cyrus Frisch voted for Harold and Maude. Frisch commented: "An encouragement to think beyond the obvious!"

In 2017, Chicago Tribune critic Mark Caro wrote a belated appreciation, "I'm sorry, Harold and Maude, for denying you for so long. You're my favorite movie once again."

Ruth Gordon lived most of the last years of her life on Martha's Vineyard Island. In her honor, the Island movie theater in Oak Bluffs would typically run the film for one night each June. In some instances, she would attend the showing and engage in a question-and-answer session following the presentation.

=== Accolades ===
At the 29th Golden Globe Awards, Cort and Gordon were nominated as Best Actor and Best Actress – Motion Picture Musical or Comedy, respectively.

The film was selected for preservation in the National Film Registry in 1997, along with others deemed "culturally, historically or aesthetically significant" by the Library of Congress.

In September 2008, Empire ranked Harold and Maude number 65 on their list of the "500 Greatest Movies of All Time". Entertainment Weekly ranked the film number four on their 2003 list of "The Top 50 Cult Films".

==== American Film Institute lists ====
Harold and Maude has repeatedly been ranked among the various lists compiled by the American Film Institute (AFI). In 2000. the film ranked number 45 on AFI's 100 Years...100 Laughs, a list of the top 100 comedies. Two years later, Harold and Maude ranked number 69 on AFI's 100 Years...100 Passions, honoring the greatest love stories of the past century. In 2006, the film ranked number 89 on AFI's 100 Years...100 Cheers, recognizing the most inspiring films. In June 2008, AFI revealed its 10 Top 10, the 10 best films in 10 "classic" American film genres, placing Harold and Maude at number nine in the romantic comedy genre.

== Music ==
The music in Harold and Maude was composed and performed by Cat Stevens. He had been suggested by Elton John to do the music after John had dropped out of the project. Stevens composed two original songs for the film, "Don't Be Shy" and "If You Want to Sing Out, Sing Out" and performed instrumental and alternative versions of the previously released songs "On the Road to Find Out", "I Wish, I Wish", "Miles from Nowhere", "Tea for the Tillerman", "I Think I See the Light", "Where Do the Children Play?" and "Trouble" (all from his albums Mona Bone Jakon and Tea for the Tillerman). "Don't Be Shy" and "If You Want to Sing Out, Sing Out" remained unreleased on any album until the 1984 compilation Footsteps in the Dark: Greatest Hits, Vol. 2.

Additional music in the film is sourced from well known compositions. "Greensleeves" is played on the harp during dinner. The opening bars of Tchaikovsky's Piano Concerto No. 1 are heard during the scene of Harold floating face-down in the swimming pool. The Sunnyvale HS Marching Band plays "The Klaxon" by Henry Fillmore outside the church following a funeral. A calliope version of the waltz "Over the Waves" by Juventino Rosas is played at the amusement park. Harold and Maude waltz together in her home to "The Blue Danube" by Johann Strauss II.

The soundtrack album charted at number 173 on the US Billboard 200 in July 2021.

=== 1972 soundtrack ===
The first soundtrack was released in Japan in 1972 on vinyl and cassette (A&M Records GP-216). It omitted the two original songs and all instrumental and alternative versions of songs and was generally composed of re-released material that was in the film, along with five songs that were not in the film.

Track listing

- Side one
  1. "Morning Has Broken" (not in the film)
  2. "Wild World" (not in the film)
  3. "I Think I See the Light"
  4. "I Wish, I Wish"
  5. "Trouble"
  6. "Father and Son" (not in the film)
- Side two
  1. "Miles from Nowhere"
  2. "Lilywhite" (not in the film)
  3. "Where Do the Children Play?"
  4. "On the Road to Find Out"
  5. "Lady D'Arbanville" (not in the film)
  6. "Tea for the Tillerman"

=== 2007 soundtrack ===
The second soundtrack was released on December 28, 2007, by Vinyl Films Records as a vinyl-only limited-edition release of 2,500 copies. It contained a 30-page oral history of the making of the film, comprising the most extensive series of interviews yet conducted on Harold and Maude.

Track listing

- Side one
  1. "Don't Be Shy"
  2. "On the Road to Find Out"
  3. "I Wish, I Wish"
  4. "Miles from Nowhere"
  5. "Tea for the Tillerman"
  6. "I Think I See the Light"
- Side two
  1. "Where Do the Children Play?"
  2. "If You Want to Sing Out, Sing Out"
  3. "If You Want to Sing Out, Sing Out" (banjo version) – previously unreleased
  4. "Trouble"
  5. "Don't Be Shy" (alternate version) – previously unreleased
  6. "If You Want to Sing Out, Sing Out" (instrumental version) – previously unreleased
- Bonus 7″ single
  1. "Don't Be Shy" (demo version) – previously unreleased
  2. "If You Want to Sing Out, Sing Out" (alternative version) – previously unreleased

=== 2021 soundtrack ===
A Record Store Day limited edition, available in yellow or orange vinyl, was released July 2021. It contained all the main songs from the 2007 album, but omitted the bonus material.

- Side one
  1. "Don't Be Shy"
  2. "On the Road to Find Out"
  3. "I Wish, I Wish"
  4. "Miles from Nowhere"
- Side two
  1. "Tea for the Tillerman'
  2. "I Think I See the Light"
  3. "Where Do the Children Play?"
  4. "If You Want to Sing Out, Sing Out"
  5. "Trouble"

=== 2022 soundtrack ===
The full soundtrack album received its first regular wide commercial release on February 11, 2022, to commemorate the film's 50th anniversary. The entire album was remastered at Abbey Road Studios. The disc includes previously unheard audio masters discovered in the Island/A&M Records archive for the two original songs Stevens wrote for the film, "Don't Be Shy" and "If You Want To Sing Out, Sing Out". While there was an LP, this was also the album's first-ever release on CD. The digital release contains eight additional tracks.

- Side one
  1. "Don't Be Shy"
  2. Dialogue 1 (I Go to Funerals)
  3. "On the Road to Find Out"
  4. "I Wish, I Wish"
  5. Tchaikovsky's Concerto No.1 in B
  6. Dialogue 2 (How Many Suicides)
  7. Marching Band / Dialogue 3 (Harold Meets Maude)
  8. "Miles from Nowhere"
  9. "Tea for the Tillerman"
- Side two
  1. "I Think I See the Light"
  2. Dialogue 4 (Sunflower)
  3. "Where Do the Children Play?"
  4. "If You Want To Sing Out, Sing Out" (Ruth Gordon and Bud Cort vocal)
  5. Strauss' Blue Danube
  6. Dialogue 5 (Somersaults)
  7. "If You Want to Sing Out, Sing Out"
  8. Dialogue 6 (Harold Loves Maude)
  9. "Trouble"
  10. "If You Want to Sing Out, Sing Out (ending)
- Additional tracks included in digital release:
  1. "Don't Be Shy (Demo)"
  2. "I Wish, I Wish (Studio Demo)"
  3. "Miles from Nowhere (Demo Version)"
  4. "I Think I See the Light (Studio Demo)"
  5. "If You Want to Sing Out, Sing Out" (Demo)
  6. "Trouble (Studio Demo)"
  7. "You Can Do (Whatever)!"
  8. "Don't Be Shy (No Piano / Alternate Take)"

== Adaptations ==
=== Stage play adaptation ===
Colin Higgins turned the story into a stage play, which, itself adapted into French by Jean-Claude Carrière, opened in 1973 at the Théâtre Récamier in Paris and proved a major hit. With Madeleine Renaud as Maude and Daniel Rivière as Harold, the play was directed by Renaud's husband, Jean-Louis Barrault, and costumed by Yves Saint Laurent. Renaud would reprise the role in multiple revivals.

A London production, with Bessie Love mentioned for Maude, was planned for 1978 but did not happen. Two years later, the Broadway production, starring Janet Gaynor as Maude and Keith McDermott as Harold, closed after four performances in February 1980.

The Yugoslav premiere of Harold i Mod was staged at the Belgrade Drama Theatre (BDP) on March 23, 1980, directed by Paolo Magelli, with Tatjana Lukjanova (Maude), Milan Erak (Harold), and Žiža Stojanović (Mrs. Chasen). Slobodan Beštić later assumed the role of Harold. The play remained in the BDP repertoire until Lukjanova's death in 2003.

In Brazil, the first run of the play premiered in 2007, directed by João Falcão and starring Arlindo Lopes as Harold and Gloria Menezes as Maude. Nívea Maria assumed the role of Maude in the relaunch of the play in 2022.

=== French television adaptation ===
A French adaptation for television, translated and written by Jean-Claude Carrière, aired in 1978. It was also adapted for the stage by the Compagnie Viola Léger in Moncton, New Brunswick, starring Roy Dupuis.

=== Musical adaptation ===
A musical adaptation, with songs by Joseph Thalken and Tom Jones, premiered at the Paper Mill Playhouse in Millburn, NJ, in January 2005. The production starred Estelle Parsons as Maude and Eric Millegan as Harold.

=== Unproduced sequel and prequel ===
Higgins expressed interest in 1978 regarding both a sequel and prequel to Harold and Maude. Cort would return for Harold's Story, living life after Maude. Higgins also imagined the prequel Grover and Maude, where Maude learns how to steal cars from Grover Muldoon—the character portrayed by Richard Pryor in Higgins' 1976 film Silver Streak—with Gordon and Pryor reprising their respective roles.

== See also ==
- List of American films of 1971
- List of cult films

== Bibliography ==
- Davidson, James A. (2016). Hal Ashby and the Making of Harold and Maude. Jefferson, North Carolina: McFarland & Company. ISBN 978-1-4766-2385-6.
- Dawson, Nick (2009). Being Hal Ashby: Life of a Hollywood Rebel. Lexington, Kentucky: University Press of Kentucky. doi:10.5810/kentucky/9780813125381.001.0001. ISBN 978-0-8131-2538-1.
- Gordon, Ruth (1976). My Side: The Autobiography of Ruth Gordon. New York: Harper & Row. ISBN 978-0-06-011618-7.
- Peary, Danny (1981). Cult Movies: The Classics, the Sleepers, the Weird, and the Wonderful. New York: Delacorte Press. ISBN 978-0-440-01626-7.
