= Trouble (Cat Stevens song) =

Song by Cat Stevens

from the album Mona Bone Jakon
- Written: 1969-1970
- Released: April 1970
- Recorded: January/February 1970
- Studio: Olympic Studios, London
- Genre: Folk rock
- Label: Island Records (UK/Europe); A&M Records (US/Canada)
- Songwriter: Cat Stevens
- Producer: Paul Samwell-Smith

"Trouble" is a 1970 song by British singer-songwriter Cat Stevens, during a period from 1969 to 1970. It appears on his 1970 album Mona Bone Jakon, as well as in the 1971 film Harold and Maude. The song talks of Stevens's near-death struggle with tuberculosis in 1968, hence the lyrics "Oh trouble move away...you have made me a wreck, now won't you leave me in my misery?" The tuberculosis put a stop to his initial fame as a teenage pop star in the 1960s.

== Background ==
Stevens was recovering during what amounted to nearly a year of convalescence, after being diagnosed with a collapsed lung and tuberculosis. He spent three months in King Edward VII Hospital, Midhurst, England, transferring afterward to another nine months of bedrest at home. Stevens, who was near death at the time he was admitted in the hospital, used the time he was recuperating for contemplation, and wrote dozens of songs, including "Trouble", many of which were recorded much later.

When he was hospitalized, Stevens was often alone in a very spare and plain room. He was told that at the time he was admitted, he had perhaps only a few weeks of life left in him. The effect on the 19-year-old pop star was pronounced. He said, "To go from the show business environment and find you are in hospital, getting injections day in and day out, and people around you are dying, it certainly changes your perspective. I got down to thinking about myself. It seemed almost as if I had my eyes shut." The song itself shows Stevens switching from heavily orchestrated pop music to a folk-rock emphasis.

In a 2001 box set, Stevens commented on the song, stating it "[describes] the tragedy of my illness and how it took me out of the limelight and the whirling of the business. And again re-stating that conviction that I would not lose control this time around."

While recovering, Stevens donated his spare time, and some of his newer, more introspective songs for Colin Higgins and Hal Ashby's 1971 film Harold and Maude. Most of the tunes used for the movie appear on Stevens's next albums, Mona Bone Jakon and Tea for the Tillerman, with the exception of two songs which were not released until the release of the album Footsteps in the Dark: Greatest Hits Vol. 2 in 1984, "If You Want to Sing Out, Sing Out" and "Don't Be Shy".

In Harold and Maude the song "Trouble" is used in the scene of Maude's impending death, with her devoted young lover heartbroken over the turn of events.

== Appearances in the media ==
- The Cat Stevens recording was used in the 1971 film Harold and Maude, starring Bud Cort and Ruth Gordon.
- The song was also used in the 2006 film A Guide to Recognizing Your Saints, starring Robert Downey, Jr., Channing Tatum, Rosario Dawson, and Shia LaBeouf. It is based on a 2001 memoir of the same name by Dito Montiel, in which he described growing up in Astoria, New York during the 1980s.
- The song was featured in an episode of ER. The song has been featured on the soundtrack of the pilot for the television show Alias, and in an episode of Everwood.
- The song, performed by The Holmes Brothers, was used on the soundtrack of the TV series Crossing Jordan, and is included on the album Music From the NBC Television Series Crossing Jordan, 2003.
- The song was used in the 2008 documentary American Teen, directed by Nanette Burstein.
- The song was used in the 2011 independent film Bringing Up Bobby, directed by Famke Janssen.
- The song is performed by Leem Lubany in the film Rock the Kasbah starring Bill Murray.
- The song was used at the end of the episode "Not Giants, But Windmills" of the television show Graves (S01E10).

== Cover versions ==
- Kristin Hersh, formerly of the Throwing Muses, recorded a rendition of the song for her 2001 solo album, Sunny Border Blue.
- Red Hot Chili Peppers as well as their guitarist John Frusciante as a solo artist have covered the song live
- Eddie Vedder of Pearl Jam performs a rendition of the song.
- The Athens, Georgia jam band Widespread Panic performs the song live. After a single live performance in 1989, the band added the song to its regular rotation of cover songs in 2000, and has performed it over 40 times since. A live performance version from the band's 20 July 2002 concert appears on the DVD Live from the Backyard.
- Elliott Smith recorded a cover of the song for the soundtrack of the film, Thumbsucker.
- Texas Country singer Bruce Robison covers the song on his album Long Way Home from Anywhere.
- Marissa Nadler covers the song on her album "COVERS VOLUME I".
- Father John Misty recorded a cover of the song in 2012 for the documentary, "Once I Was: The Hal Ashby Story." It appears on his EP Anthem +3.
- Bluegrass band Barnstar! released a cover on their album Sit Down! Get Up! Get Out!
