= Stageworks Theatre =

Theatre in Florida, U.S.

Stageworks Theatre is a theatre, based in Tampa, Florida currently being led by Producing Artistic Director Karla Hartley. Stageworks Theatre took possession of its own performance space in 2011 located in the Channelside District of Tampa.

== History ==
Anna Brennen founded Stageworks Theatre in 1983 in Tampa, FL. It has thrived in Tampa, becoming an integral part of the Arts culture of the Bay Area; it is the oldest theatre company in Tampa. In 2011 Stageworks purchased a performance space and now run full operations and performances in their permanent location.

== Awards ==
Anna Brennen (Founder, Stageworks Theatre Company, Inc.) received her formal theatre training at Carnegie Mellon and the University of California, Berkeley. She studied in advanced private classes in New York City with Sandy Meisner (Neighborhood Playhouse), Mira Rostova (Moscow Art Theatre), Wynn Handmann (American Place), and Lloyd Richards (Yale University Drama School). In 2006, Anna was given the Artist of the Year Award by the Mayor of the city of Tampa, Pam Iorio.

Anna's professional acting credits include understudying Colleen Dewhurst in Hamlet, as well as the three leads in Much Ado About Nothing for the New York Shakespeare Festival. She has also appeared with the Theatre for New York City, Playwrights Horizons and the Chelsea Theatre in New York City, New York.

As a playwright, Anna's first play, Sleepless Dancer (Victims 3), had an Equity showcase production at N.E.T.W.O.R.K. in New York City in 1980. She was a recipient of a Florida Arts Council Playwriting Fellowship in 1981. In 1989, she received an Emerging Artists grant from the Hillsborough County Arts Council for her new play, Echo Nevada, in 1991 the Hillsborough Arts Council honored her with the individual Artist Award. " In Tampa, she has produced and/or directed over 90 mainstage shows.

== Awards ==
Recipient	Award	Presenter
Anna Brennen, Founder	Mayor's Artist of the Year 2006	Greater Tampa Chamber of Commerce
Stageworks Theatre	Neighborhood Builder of the Year 2007	Bank of America
Main Stage Productions	Named 'The Best Of" in at least four categories	The Tampa Tribune and Creative Loafing
Stageworks Theatre	Non-Profit of the Year	Tampa Bay Business Journal
