= Footsteps in the Dark: Greatest Hits, Vol. 2 =

Footsteps in the Dark: Greatest Hits Vol. 2

Greatest hits album by Cat Stevens
- Released: November 1984
- Genre: Rock
- Length: 47:58
- Label: A&M
- Producer: Paul Samwell-Smith: # Billboard Hot 200

Cat Stevens chronology
Morning Has Broken (1981)	Footsteps in the Dark: Greatest Hits Vol. 2 (1984)	Classics, Volume 24 (1987)

Footsteps in the Dark: Greatest Hits Vol. 2 is a compilation album released by Cat Stevens in 1984. Its fourteen songs include hits such as "Father and Son" and "Where Do the Children Play?" as well as two previously unreleased tracks from the Hal Ashby and Colin Higgins black comedy Harold and Maude (1971), and the obscure B-side "I Want to Live in a Wigwam" from the Teaser sessions.

== Track listing ==
All songs written by Cat Stevens, except where noted.

1. "The Wind" – 1:42
2. "(I Never Wanted) To Be a Star" – 3:00
3. "Katmandu" – 3:20
4. "I Want to Live in a Wigwam" – 3:23
5. "Trouble" – 2:45
6. "On the Road to Find Out" – 5:08
7. "If You Want to Sing Out, Sing Out" – 2:46
8. "Where Do the Children Play?" – 3:52
9. "Daytime" (Cat Stevens, Alun Davies) – 3:55
10. "Don't Be Shy" – 2:50
11. "How Can I Tell You" – 4:26
12. "Father and Son" – 3:40
13. "The Hurt" – 4:17
14. "Silent Sunlight" – 2:59

== Charts ==
Chart (1982/1984)	Peak position
Australia (Kent Music Report)	3
US Billboard Top LPs & Tape	165

=== Year-end charts ===
Chart (1982)	Peak position
Australia (Kent Music Report)	17

== Certifications ==
Region	Certification	Certified units/sales
Australia (ARIA)	Platinum	50,000^{^}
^{^} Shipments figures based on certification alone.
