= Lady D'Arbanville =

- Cover of the song's sheet music

Single by Cat Stevens

from the album Mona Bone Jakon
- B-side: "Fill My Eyes"
- Released: April 1970
- Recorded: 1970
- Genre: Folk rock
- Length: 3:15
- Label: Island (UK/Europe); A&M (US/Canada)
- Songwriter: Cat Stevens
- Producer: Paul Samwell-Smith

Cat Stevens singles chronology
"Where Are You" (1969)	"Lady D'Arbanville" (1970)	"Father and Son" (1970)

"Lady D'Arbanville" is a song written and recorded by Cat Stevens and released in April 1970. It subsequently appeared on his third album, Mona Bone Jakon, released later that year. It was his first single released after signing a contract with Island Records, with the encouragement of his new producer, Paul Samwell-Smith, fostering a folk rock direction. "Lady D'Arbanville" has a madrigal sound, and was written about Stevens's former girlfriend, Patti D'Arbanville, metaphorically laying her to rest.

== Background ==
"Lady D'Arbanville" was the first single released from Mona Bone Jakon, which took off in a completely different direction from the songs of his previous two albums. Although Stevens's debut album had charted, and while both albums he had recorded had successful single releases in the British pop music charts, he chafed against the "Carnaby Street musical jangle" and "heavy-handed orchestration" that his producer, Mike Hurst (of Deram Records) favoured. Just at the completion of his second album with Hurst, Stevens contracted tuberculosis and a collapsed lung, requiring hospitalisation and rest for a year. During this time, he spent his empty hours writing more than 40 songs, and upon a clean bill of health successfully negotiated out of his Deram contract, and settled on Island Records' Paul Samwell-Smith as his new producer, who encouraged Stevens's inclinations towards an emerging folk rock genre.

As Stevens was nearing the end of his period of recuperation, he attended a party that boasted a gathering of musicians in London including Jimmy Page, Steve Winwood, Ginger Baker, Eric Clapton and others. Among the party-goers was Patti D'Arbanville, a US teenager who was pursuing a modelling career and later gained prominence as an actress. The two began dating. D'Arbanville stayed with him whenever she was in London, but often found her career taking her to Paris, and New York City. After over a year together, Stevens was ready to invest in a more serious relationship than was his young, ambitious girlfriend. It was on a foray to New York that she heard his song about her on the airwaves. Her reaction was one of sadness. She said,

I just have to be by myself for a while to do what I want to do. It's good to be alone sometimes. Look, Steven [Stevens's given name] wrote that song when I left for New York. I left for a month, it wasn't the end of the world was it? But he wrote this whole song about 'Lady D'Arbanville, why do you sleep so still.' It's about me dead. So while I was in New York, for him it was like I was lying in a coffin... he wrote that because he missed me, because he was down... It's a sad song.

D'Arbanville continues,

I cried when I heard it, because that's when I knew it was over for good.

== Musical genre and sound ==
While Stevens's previous singles featured orchestration, this was the first single to contain only acoustic guitars, bass, organ, percussion, and vocals. Newly hired Alun Davies, initially brought in as a session guitarist, shared Stevens's love for the newly emerging folk rock sound that Stevens chose to pursue. The two guitarists worked with John Ryan's syncopated basslines and drummer Harvey Burns' latin rhythms were used to emphasize the beat of the song on the body of the guitar. Stevens said of it later, that "the name itself was intriguing", and that "it was one of the unique songs that stood out, even lyrically". The song had a unique arrangement, and melody as well. A backing vocal chorus in the style of Spaghetti Western classics added intrigue. The song had enough commercial appeal to reach No.8 on the British pop music chart, and became the first Stevens's track to get noticeable airplay in the United States. "Lady D'Arbanville" was issued in June 1970 and became his third top ten hit in the UK, with the album Mona Bone Jakon, beginning a modest climb up the charts as well.

== Charts ==
Chart (1970)	Peak position
UK Singles	8
Canada RPM	69
New Zealand Listener	16

== Personnel ==
- Cat Stevens – guitar, keyboards, vocals
- Alun Davies – guitar, backing vocals
- John Ryan – double bass
- Harvey Burns – percussion

== Other versions ==
Elton John also performed a version of "Lady D'Arbanville" for a covers record, at a time in his career when he was still in relative obscurity. However, in parts of the song, he substitutes the word fill. The original song is written thus:

"My Lady D'Arbanville, why do you sleep so still?
I'll wake you tomorrow, and you will be my fill,
Yes, you will be my fill

Elton John's version has him singing "You will be my pill", instead of the original lyrics. John's career took off around the same time as that of Stevens, and the cover songs that John sang on, including "Lady D'Arbanville", remained in obscurity until they were eventually released on a compilation album titled Chartbusters Go Pop in 1994.

In 1970, the song was recorded in both French and Italian by French-Italian Singer Dalida and released on singles in France and Italy. Italian singer Gigliola Cinquetti also recorded the song in Italian the same year.

Japanese singer Hiromi Iwasaki performed a Japanese version of the song on a cover album published in 1979.

English band And Also the Trees also performed the song on their 1989 album Farewell to the Shade.
