= Othon Mataragas =

OTHON
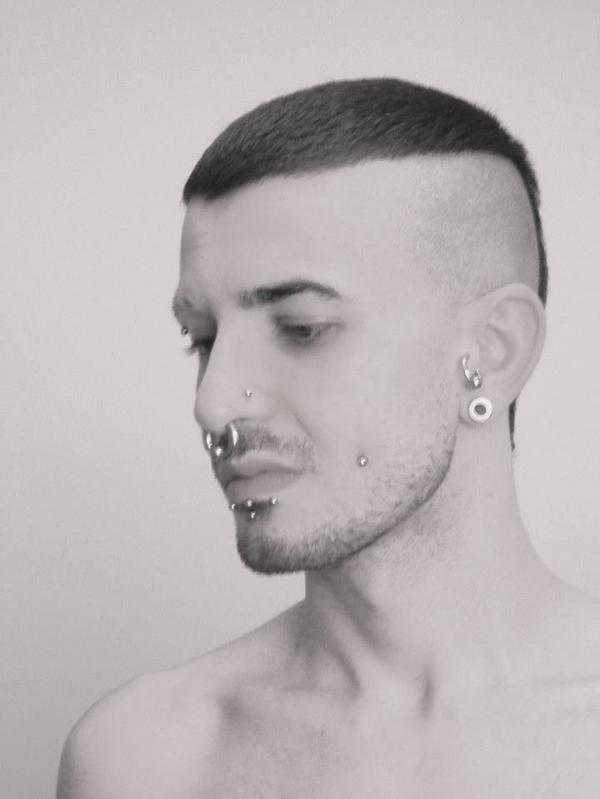

Background information
- Born: Othon Mataragas; Athens, Greece
- Origin: Greece
- Genres: Electronic, Techno, Downtempo, Neoclassical
- Occupations: Electronic music producer, DJ
- Website: www.othonmusic.com

OTHON (also known as Othon Mataragas) is a London-based Greek electronic music producer and DJ. His work blends techno, downtempo and neoclassical elements, sometimes incorporating atmospheric and ceremonial influences, informed by a background in composition. He has previously worked as a pianist, songwriter and club promoter.

His music combines electronic production with influences from classical and experimental traditions, and he has collaborated with artists including Wolfgang Tillmans, Marc Almond and David Tibet.

== Early life ==
Othon Mataragas started to play the piano at the age of four and the following year he gave his first recital. At seven he entered the National Conservatoire (Greece) and graduated at sixteen with Distinction after winning the Prize of Exceptional Interpretation and the Xanthopoulidis Prize. While in Greece, Othon gave numerous recitals including a concert in the memory of Gina Bachauer. organised by the Cultural Center of the City of Halandri. He appeared on Greek television both national (ERT) and private (ANT1, Blue Sky) and won several competitions and awards such as the National X.O.N. prize. At the end of the '90s he moved to London in the UK where he studied piano and composition at the Royal College of Music with British pianist Peter Katin, Birkbeck College as well as at Trinity College of Music with composers Andrew Poppy and Stephen Montague. As a Leverhulme Scholar at Trinity he won the John Halford Prize. During this time he wrote his first pieces, and after leaving college he began his professional career as a composer and songwriter.

== Pre 2012 Projects & Collaborations ==
In the early days, Almond was among the first artists to spot his talent, others include David Tibet and Peter Christopherson, and Othon collaborated with them on various projects. In 2007, he performed a number of concerts with Current 93. Other collaborations of note include those with composer Stephen Montague (Sonic Swamp, commissioned by Eye Music for the Colourscape Music Festival 2006), fashion designer Nasir Mazhar (London Fashion Week), photographer Hector de Gregorio and performance artist Ron Athey with whom he performed in 2009 at the Napoli Teatro Festival Italia. He composed music for the soundtracks of films by Bruce LaBruce (Otto; or, Up With Dead People), Derek Jarman (a new music setting for The Angelic Conversation, played live at the GLBT Film Festival in Turin) and Jörg Buttgereit (new soundtrack of Nekromantik, played live at the Pre Final Fest in Rome).

In 2005 and during his time at Trinity College, he met Ernesto Tomasini with whom he started an ongoing collaboration. As Othon & Tomasini they performed Othon's music in concert halls, theatres, museums and churches all across Europe. In UK they performed in venues such as the Roundhouse, Leicester Square Theatre, Royal Exchange Theatre and National Portrait Gallery. Othon's debut album, Digital Angel, which features the voices of Almond, Tibet, and Tomasini, was released at the end of 2008 on the Durtro Jnana label.

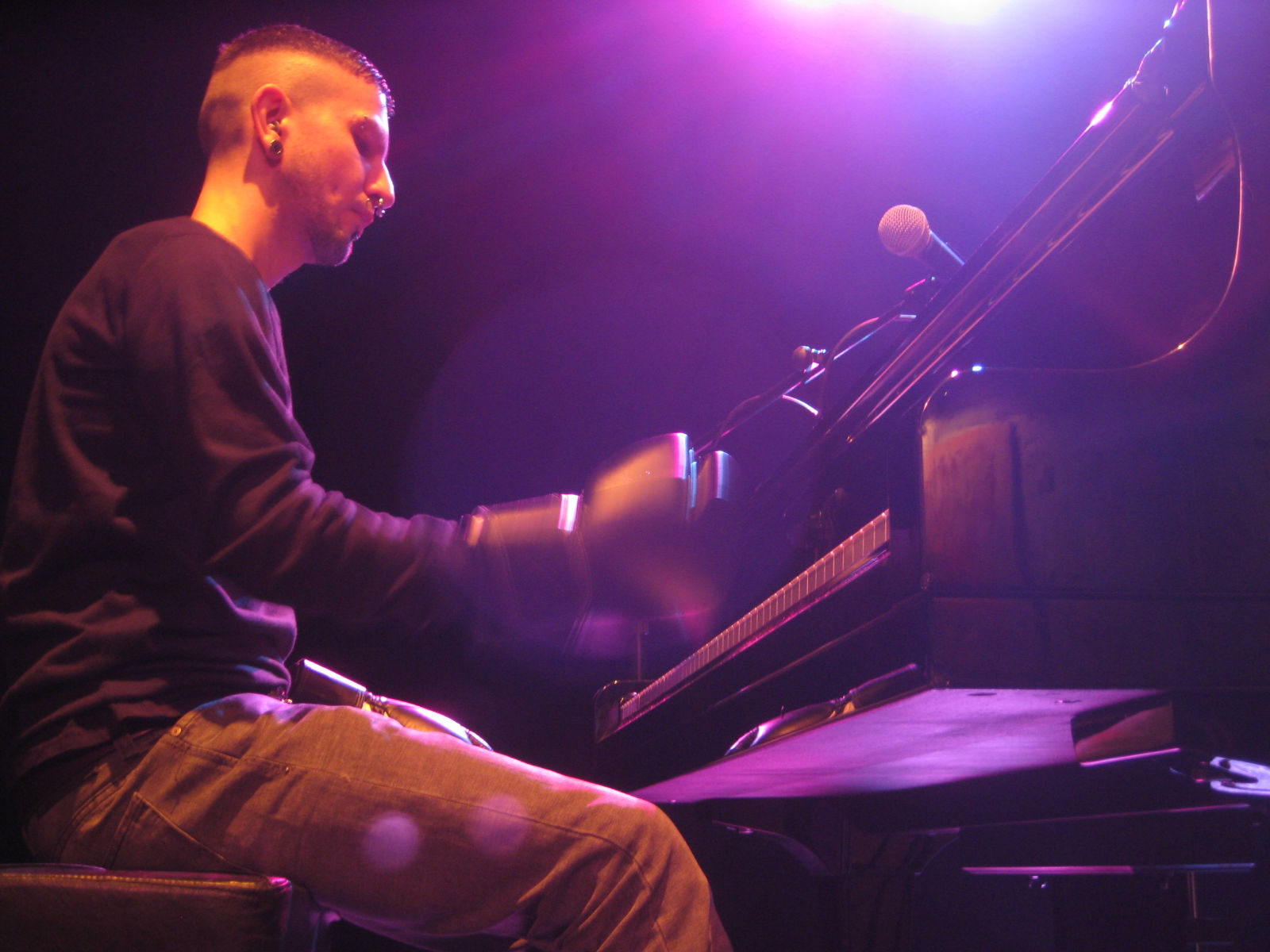
Othon performs his signature piece Boxer Coaster wearing boxing gloves.

In October 2009 Othon gave the world premiere of Boxer Coaster, the first piece ever composed for a pianist wearing boxing gloves, at the Pre Final Fest in Rome. Othon's second album entitled Impermanence, which includes vocal performances by Ernesto Tomasini, Marc Almond, Camille O'Sullivan and Othon, with Justin Jones (from And Also the Trees) on the guitar, was released by Cherry Red Records/SFE in November 2011. Impermanence was voted by leading Greek music website Postwave.gr the best Greek album of 2011. Othon collaborated again with Ron Athey in 2011 for his large scale performance 'Gifts of the Spirit: Automatic Writing' in which he played under hypnosis while wearing boxing gloves and composed the soundtrack to performance artist Franko B's latest work entitled 'Because of Love' (2012). Othon composed the soundtrack for the awarded graphic novel The Tale of Brin & Bent and Minno Marylebone, written by Ravi Thornton and published by Jonathan Cape, Random House in 2012.

== Post 2012 Projects & Collaborations ==
In 2012, Othon experienced a deep spiritual epiphany, after attending his first series of psychoactive plant-medicine ceremonies in Brazil, including Ayahuasca. This was to change both his perception on life and his understanding on music. Though he had composed and performed music previously, Othon has wished to highlight the distinction from the work he created prior and after 2012, the year which he now considers as his true starting point

In 2014, Othon released his third album (or what he now considers as his first album) Pineal via Cherry Red Records/Strike Force Entertainment, after he raised money from a successful fundraising campaign (Indiegogo). Swinging from cinematic pop and fierce shamanic techno to jungle evoking downtempo and violin driven electronica (Music News), Pineal forms both a link to the past (Part 1), and a fresh post-2012 beginning (Part 2) It features performances by past collaborators Marc Almond and Ernesto Tomasini together with amazonian shamans Don Javier Shahuano & Jessica Ramirez Seopa and multiinstrumentalist Bird Radio. Pineal, which includes original artwork and photography by Predrag Pajdic received numerous positive reviews, including a full page preview at The Guardian Guide.

Othon composed & produced the soundtrack for Against Nature, based on the book À Rebours by Joris-Karl Huysmans, after creating an overwhelmingly successful fundraising campaign with project collaborators Marc Almond and British writer Jeremy Reed, in 2015 *[5.] In the same year, SFE released his Cobra Coral EP featuring a remix of the eponymous track by German duo Boss Axis .

In March 2017, his collaboration with photographer Wolfgang Tillmans resulted in a concert at Tate Modern, London. Othon performed a continuous set of dream-like semi-improvisations at the piano while Tillmans provided sonic interventions throughout the duration of the piece. Later in the year, Othon did another successful crowd-funding campaign , offering exclusively to his fans his new and unreleased album Kodama, to finance the creation of yet another album The God Within. British artist Dan Hillier is providing the artwork for both albums.

== DJing & Papa Loko ==
In September 2014, Othon gave his debut as a DJ for the World Ayahuasca Conference closing party in Ibiza.* This led to playing at parties such as Kaos (Electrowerkz) and Sabajaq (Egg London). In 2015 he founded his own party night Papa Loko, combining electronic music with spiritual practice in the underground club scene of London*

== Discography pre 2012 ==
Albums

- Digital Angel (Durtro Jnana, 2008)
- Impermanence (Cherry Red Records/SFE, 2011)

Singles

- Last Night I Paid To Close My Eyes (Cherry Red Records/SFE, 2011)
- Impermanence (Cherry Red Records/SFE, 2011)

Others

- Otto; or, Up With Dead People (Crippled Dick Hot Wax Records, 2008)
- Silky Hands of a Rough Piano Boy (Tapeworm, 2011)

== Discography post 2012 ==
Albums

- Pineal (Cherry Red Records/SFE, 2014)

EPs

- Cobra Coral (Cherry Red Records/SFE, 2014)

Singles

- Dawn Yet To Come (Cherry Red Records/SFE, 2014)
- Japan Suite (Black Hole Recordings/Magic Island Deep, 2015)

== Interviews & reviews ==
- Cobra Coral EP review at Louder Than War (Jul 2015)
- Cobra Coral EP review at Compuslion Online (Jul 2015)
- Pineal review at The Quietus (Jul 2014)
- Interview for Neon Nettle (Jun 2014)
- Pineal review on The Guardian (May 2014)
- Interview for The Pandorian (Dec 2011)
- Review by Daniel McKernan for Brainwashed (Nov 2011)
- Review by M.G. for African Paper (Dec 2011)
- Interview for Postwave.gr, Greece (May 2011)
- Review by Agustin G. Cascales for Shangay (Spain Dec 2011)
- Othon & Tomasini interview and live performance in the program Carne Cruda for Radio 3, Spain (Nov 2010)
- Othon & Tomasini performance in the program Fluido Rosa for Radio 3, Spain (Jul 2009)
