= Gods of Luxury =

Ambient dub music project

Gods of Luxury / G.O.L.
- Origin: England
- Genre: Ambient dub
- Years active: 1989–present
- Label: China Records
- Past members: Antonia Reiner; Justin Jones; Mark Tibenham

Gods of Luxury or G.O.L. was a 1995 music project consisting of Mark Tibenham, Antonia Reiner and Justin Jones.

== History ==
In 1995 they released their debut album, Sensations of Tone, which included the tracks "Soma Holiday", "Angelica in Delirium", and cover versions of the Art of Noise song Moments in Love and the And Also the Trees song "There Were No Bounds", among others. One year later, "Soma Holiday" was released as a CD-single. Some of the album tracks appeared on several ambient music sampler albums.

The spoken words for "Angelica in Delirium" were taken from the Old Testament's "Song of Songs", also known as "The Song of Solomon". The lyrics for "Soma Holiday" were taken from the 1932 Aldous Huxley novel, Brave New World.

On January 8, 2016, G.O.L. released re-released Sensations of Tone as well as also releasing Bonus Recordings 1995–1996, a collection of unreleased songs. Both albums were released on Cherry Red Records.

== Discography ==
- 1995: Sensations of Tone (CD album), China Records
- 1996: Soma Holiday (CD single), China Records
- 2016: Bonus Recordings 1995 - 1996, (Download album), Cherry Red Records
