= If You Want to Sing Out, Sing Out =

1971 song by Cat Stevens

- US single

Single by Cat Stevens

from the album Footsteps in the Dark: Greatest Hits, Vol. 2
- B-side: "I Want to Live in a Wigwam" (US); "Daytime" (ES)
- Released: December 1984
- Recorded: 1971
- Genre: Folk rock, pop rock
- Length: 2:46
- Label: Island (UK/Europe); A&M (US/Canada)
- Songwriter: Cat Stevens
- Producer: Paul Samwell-Smith

Cat Stevens singles chronology
"Last Love Song" (1979)	"If You Want to Sing Out, Sing Out" (1984)	"Peace Train (re-recording)" (2003)

"If You Want To Sing Out, Sing Out" is a song by Cat Stevens for the 1971 film Harold and Maude. It was finally released in 1984 as a promo single for Stevens's compilation Footsteps in the Dark: Greatest Hits, Vol. 2. In addition, it has appeared on the UK edition of his 2003 album The Very Best of Cat Stevens.

== Overview ==
Harold and Maude contained mostly songs from Stevens's 1970 albums Mona Bone Jakon and Tea for the Tillerman, however, Stevens also wrote "If You Want to Sing Out, Sing Out", as well as another song ("Don't Be Shy") for the movie. Stevens recalled that he "went into Wally Heider’s [studio] in San Francisco and cut these songs that I always wanted to re-record properly, but I never did because he wanted them for the film.” These were not released as singles nor placed on any album at that time.

Stevens later stated that he had "never allowed them to put out the soundtrack because it would have sounded like a collection of greatest hits and I felt like I was only at the start of my career. But I did write two songs for the film. I did the demos in San Francisco and I always meant to do them properly but no, Hal puts them straight into the film and that was it, locked away. I love those recordings now because they’re so raw.” Despite Stevens's wishes, in 1972, the first soundtrack album for Harold and Maude was released by A&M, but exclusive to Japan. It did not contain "Don't Be Shy" or "Sing Out", rather it was more of a greatest hits album, containing songs like "Father and Son" which were not in the original film.

The first 'true' soundtrack album to the film was released in December 2007, by Vinyl Films Records, as a vinyl-only limited edition release of 2500 copies, which were "snapped up right away." It contained an extensive 30-page oral history of the making of the film, as well as a 7" inch of "Sing Out" and "Don't Be Shy".

The soundtrack was reissued for the film's 50th anniversary in 2022, on "general release".

== In popular culture ==
The song was covered by James Marsden, Ariana Greenblatt and Jacob Collier in the 2021 animated feature The Boss Baby: Family Business.
