= The Dancing Marquis =

Studio album by Marc Almond
- Released: 16 June 2014
- Studios: Dean Street Studios (London); Avatar (New York City); Wits End Studio
- Genre: Pop
- Length: 45:41
- Label: Strike Force Entertainment / Cherry Red Records
- Producers: Tony Visconti, Tris Penna, Jarvis Cocker, Jason Buckle, Marc Almond

Marc Almond chronology
| The Tyburn Tree (2014) | The Dancing Marquis (2014) | Ten Plagues – A Song Cycle (2014) |

The Dancing Marquis is the eighteenth solo studio album by the British singer/songwriter Marc Almond. It was released by Strike Force Entertainment / Cherry Red Records on 16 June 2014.

== Background ==
The Dancing Marquis compiles the songs from the limited edition 7" vinyl EPs Burn Bright and Tasmanian Tiger together with two new tracks and two remixes. The album features guest appearances from Jarvis Cocker and Carl Barât, and some of the tracks were produced by Tony Visconti.

The title track is named for Henry Paget, 5th Marquess of Anglesey according to Almond in an interview with author Tony O'Neill. The Marquess "haunts Almond's new album", which O'Neill calls "Marc's poppiest and most accessible work in years".

The song "Death of a Dandy" is a tribute to the London artist Sebastian Horsley who had died at the time and features a guest appearance from Danielz, who plays in the T-Rex tribute band T.Rextasy.

Jarvis Cocker wrote and produced "Worship Me Now" for Almond, although the pair had never met, and also "whispered" backing vocals for the track.

Almond had worked with Carl Barât before and asked for a song for the album, which Barât delivered in "Love Is Not on Trial", alongside vocal and guitar contributions.

== Critical reception ==
Professional ratings
Review scores
| Source | Rating |
|---|---|
| AllMusic | 3.5/5 stars |
| Louder Than War | 8.5/10 stars |

The review at Louder Than War calls the album "more magic from a national treasure" commenting that "you never lose the knack of writing a good tune, and it's something that has never left Marc". The limited edition EP Tasmanian Tiger was reviewed separately by The Quietus who feel it is "another reason to treasure one of the music world's most inspired and restless mavericks". Thom Jurek at AllMusic calls The Dancing Marquis album "a glorious tease" and states that "there is a bit of everything here", from ballads, glam waltzes, pulsing synths, and modern pop.

== Track listing ==
| No. | Title | Writer(s) | Producer | Length |
|---|---|---|---|---|
| 1. | "The Dancing Marquis" | Marc Almond, Neal Whitmore | Tony Visconti | 3:46 |
| 2. | "Burn Bright" | Almond, Whitmore | Tony Visconti | 3:25 |
| 3. | "Tasmanian Tiger" | Almond, Michael Cashmore, Whitmore | Tris Penna, Tony Visconti | 4:22 |
| 4. | "Worship Me Now" (guest vocal by Jarvis Cocker) | Jarvis Cocker, Jason Buckle | Jarvis Cocker, Jason Buckle, Tris Penna | 3:01 |
| 5. | "Love Is Not on Trial" (guest guitar and vocal by Carl Barât) | Carl Barât, Davey Ray Moor | Tris Penna | 4:01 |
| 6. | "Death of a Dandy" (guest guitar by Danielz) | Almond, Cashmore | Tris Penna | 4:50 |
| 7. | "So What's Tonight?" (guest keyboards by Steve Nieve) | Almond, Steve Nieve | Marc Almond | 4:14 |
| 8. | "Idiot Dancing" | Almond, Whitmore | Marc Almond | 4:36 |
| 9. | "Worship Me Now" (Starcluster remix) | Cocker, Buckle | as original, remix by Roland Faber | 5:43 |
| 10. | "Worship Me Now" (Spatial Awareness remix) | Cocker, Buckle | as original, remix by Spatial Awareness | 7:44 |

== Personnel ==
- Marc Almond – vocals
- Neal Whitmore – guitar, keyboards, programming, synthesizer
- Carl Holt – bass
- Tim Weller – drums, percussion
- Hugh Wilkinson – talking drum, extra percussion
- Martin McCarrick – piano, cello, string arrangement
- Tony Visconti – Producer, string arrangement
- Kimberlee McCarrick – violin
- Gini Ball – violin
- Claire Orsler – viola
- Martin Watkins – piano, Hammond organ
- Katie Kresek – violin
- Rachel Golub – violin
- Entcho Todorov – violin
- Jonathan Dinklage – violin
- Ron Lawrence – viola
- Julie Goodale – viola
- Dave Eggar – cello
- Peter Sachon – cello
- Jason Buckle – keyboard programming
- Clifford Slapper – piano
- Justin Jones – orchestral guitar
- Steve Nieve – Vox Continental, piano, keyboards
- Roland Faber – drum programming, additional synthesizer
- Lousie Marshall – backing vocals
- Billy Godfrey – backing vocals
- Kelly Barnes – backing vocals
- Laura June Barnes – backing vocals
- Mazz Murray – backing vocals
- Annabell Williams – backing vocals
