= Mirco Magnani =

Italian artist

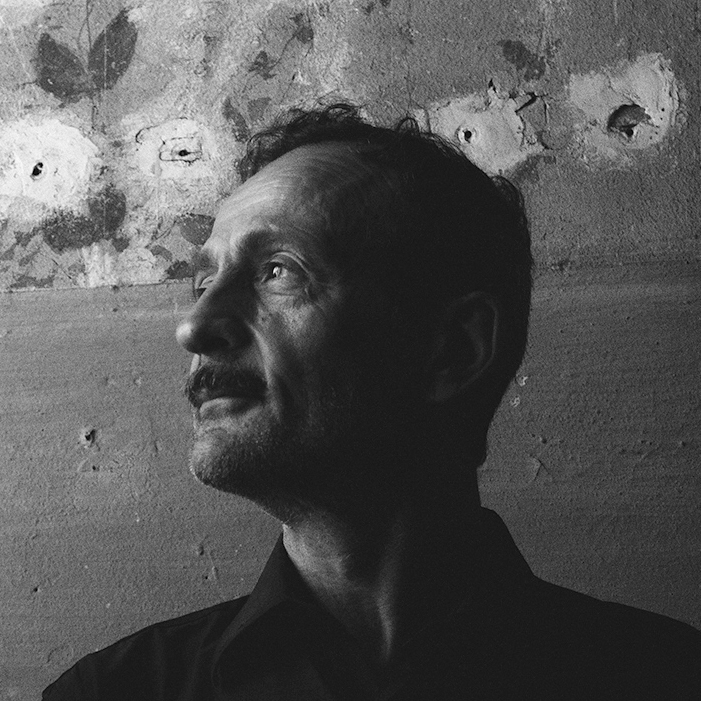

Background information
- Born: May 16, 1961 (age 64); Pistoia, Italy
- Occupations: Musician; Composer

Mirco Magnani (born May 16, 1961, in Pistoia, Italy) is an Italian composer, producer, and video artist active since the mid-1980s. His work explores innovative sounds and experimental aesthetics across genres such as new wave music, ambient music, experimental music and neoclassical music.

After over twenty years of activity in Italy, he moved to Berlin, where he further developed his style and collaborated with artists from the underground culture. His projects often merge sound, video, and literature, featuring audiovisual performances and installations. Albums like Madame E., Cronovisione Italiana and Zarathustra – Der Große Mittag reflect his focus on philosophical and cultural themes through sound.

== History ==
Mirco Magnani is a musician, composer, author, producer and video artist and was a founding member of the bands Minox, Technophonic Chamber Orchestra and 4D Killer.

Since 1984, he has produced music and mixed-media events with the 1980s new wave band Minox, a group that had an influence on the Italian new wave music scene and was part of the independent label Industrie Discografiche Lacerba. The band's lineup included Mirco Magnani, Daniele Biagini, Marco Monfardini, Enrico Faggioli and Raffaello Banci. In 1986, Faggioli and Banci died in a car accident and a year later, Biagini left the band.

In 1996, Magnani co-founded the independent record label Suite Inc., which he managed until 2006. He worked on various releases for the label and performed with artists such as Steven Brown (producer of Minox's Lazare, 1986), Blaine L. Reininger and Luc Van Lieshout of Tuxedomoon, Lydia Lunch, Krisma. When he was a member of Minox and Technophonic Chamber Orchestra some tracks were remixed by Nobukazu Takemura, Murcof, The Gentle People and Daedelus.

Between 1997 and 2005, through Minox and his label, Magnani produced albums of various bands, a single, an EP and the first album for Dubital, the debut album of Enfantronique and MissQLee. In 1998, he co-founded the side projects Technophonic Chamber Orchestra and 4D Killer, producing albums and performing live until 2010.

Since 2003, Magnani has expanded into audiovisual work, creating visuals for live shows for his projects and some Italian artists and producing video art, video installations and music videos.

In 2006, Mirco Magnani founded his solo project T.C.O., producing Decompositio Sonata, an audiovisual reinterpretation of twentieth-century classical music. In 2009, he moved to Berlin, where he expanded his artistic activities, organizing events, performing live and DJing at various Berlin parties and festivals.

In 2012, he co-founded the Undogmatisch project with painter Valentina Bardazzi. This project evolved into an interactive platform combining music and visual art, leading to the creation of an independent record label/notlabel in 2016, with Bardazzi as the creator of the label's artwork.

In 2017, Magnani collaborated with actor and opera singer Ernesto Tomasini on the concept album Madame E. , based on Georges Bataille’s short novel Madame Edwarda. The album explores themes of eroticism, religiosity and death through eleven compositions written and performed by Magnani and sung by Tomasini.

In 2018, Magnani produced Cronovisione Italiana, a concept album attributed to Carlo Domenico Valyum. The album takes listeners on a space-time journey through television history, reworking Italian TV broadcasts from the 1960s to the 1980s. Magnani was the composer, producer, and curator of this project, working with Valentina Bardazzi.

Recent important releases include collaborative improvisation sessions with Polish-Berliner Lukasz Trzcinski, resulting in two releases titled Lumiraum and Lumiraum Appendix. The concept recalls the spirituality and cosmogony of ancient cultures, drawing on symbolic ideas of the universe's origin.

In 2021, Magnani released Toretam Tor, a collaboration with former Technophonic Chamber Orchestra member Andrea De Witt. The album serves as a tribute to obsolete technologies and knowledge, reimagined for a new path towards eternal spirituality. The title refers to Töretam, an ancient burial site near the Baikonur Cosmodrome in Kazakhstan.

Between 2021 and 2023, Magnani released a three-volume compilation series titled Magnum Opus Collectio Series: Nigredo, Magnum Opus Collectio Series: Albedo and Magnum Opus Collectio Series: Rubedo. These volumes feature tracks by various international artists and are inspired by the alchemical process, representing stages in the creation of the philosopher's stone. They also draw from Carl Jung’s concept of individuation, a unique psychological process of self-realization. Magnani contributed collaborative tracks with Andrea De Witt, Andreas Yakovlev, Stamatis Dounis, Luc Van Lieshout and as member of Dinner Situation and Orquestrina Utu.

In 2024, Magnani released Zarathustra – Der Große Mittag, a project exploring the themes in Friedrich Nietzsche’s Thus Spoke Zarathustra. The album offers a multicultural perspective through four languages: German, English, Iranian, and Russian, with interpretations by Steven Brown (Tuxedomoon), Sainkho Namtchylak, Nikolas Klau, and Paganland. Following a short concert tour in Italy,.

== Discography ==
- Suite Maniacal - as member of Minox - single (1984)
- Lazare - as member of Minox (1986)
- Plaza - as member of Minox - EP (1994)
- Beats and movements - as member of Technophonic Chamber Orchestra (1998)
- U Turn - as member of Minox (1998)
- Sex, crimes and toys - as member of 4D Killer (2000)
- Downworks - as member of Minox (2001)
- Nemoretum Sonata - as member of Technophonic Chamber Orchestra (2004)
- Bianco|Flexo|Zbub - as T.C.O. - EP (2007)
- Titles - as T.C.O. (2009)
- The Die – as T.C.O. (2010)
- Uno – with Federico Nitti (2014)
- Madame E. with Ernesto Tomasini (2017)
- Plaisir (Ken Karter remix) - with Ernesto Tomasini - single (2018)
- Cronovisione Italiana - as Carlo Domenico Valyum (2018)
- Lumiraum – with Lukasz Trzcinski (2019)
- Lumiraum Appendix – with Lukasz Trzcinski - EP (2020)
- Toretam Tor - with Andrea De Witt (2021)
- Zarathustra – Der Große Mittag - feat. Steven Brown, Sainkho Namtchylak, Nikolas Klau, Paganland (2024)

=== Compilations ===
- Vox Pop 1993 - as member of Minox (1993)
- B movie show - as member of Minox and 4D Killer (1994)
- Suitable#0 The psycho lounge collective - as member of 4D Killer (2001)
- Suitable#3 The downbeatniks - as member of 4D Killer (2002)
- SnobNight Sessions – as T.C.O. (2008)
- Homecoming-Remixes – as T.C.O. (2012)
- Moments of Inertia – as T.C.O. with Stella Veloce (2013)
- At the End of Modernity - as member of Minox (2014)
- Touched 3 (2016)
- Mind the Gap - as Carlo Domenico Valyum (2018)
- LB/E La Bellezza Eccetera (2019)
- Opowieści Somnambuliczne. Tom I. "Wieczny śnieg i odwilż" - with Lukasz Trcziinski (2021)
- Καθέν@ και μια Χίμαιρα – with Lukasz Trzcinski (2021)
- Magnum Opus Collectio Series: Nigredo - with Andrea De Witt and with Andreas Yakovlev and Stamatis Dounis (2021)
- Magnum Opus Collectio Series: Albedo - with Andrea De Witt and as member of Dinner Situation (2022)
- Magnum Opus Collectio Series: Rubedo - with Luc Van Lieshout, with Andrea De Witt and as member of Orquestrina Utu (2023)
- FRE018 | V.A. - We Hear A New World Vol. 5 – with Andrea De Witt (2024)
- KrismaSuite - as member of Minox (2025)

==== Remixes ====
- Superbass (4D Killer remix) - Dubital - (1997)
- Simbiosi (Technophonic Chamber Orchestra Remix) - Meg - (2004)
- Homecoming (Remixed by T.C.O.) - Mode of Teaspoon - (2012)

== Videography ==
- Decompositio Sonata – Audiovisual (2006)
- Parenthesyne Suite – Video installation (2008)
- Corpus – Video installation (2008)
- Corpus 2 – Video installation (2009)
- Lux, Luxus, Luxuria - Video installation (2009)
- Mio Son Tuo - Video installation (2010)
- Etudes pour Madame E. - Audiovisual (2011)
- 3,14 – Video installation (2012)
- Corpus 2.2 – Video installation (2013)
- Requiemcratia – Video installation (2014)
- 3rdEye – Video installation (2014)
- Dieu dans le Bordel – Videoclip co-directed with Kiril Bikov (2017)
- Plaisir par Ken Karter – Videoclip (2017)
- Eurovision - Videoclip (2017)
- Cronovisione Italiana - Audiovisual (2018)
- Estrazioni del Lotto - Videoclip (2018)
- Vivovivente – Videoclip (2021)
- Von der Schenkenden Tugend feat. Sainkho Namtchylak – Videoclip (2024)
- Pianochrom 2 - Videoclip (2024)
- Auf dem Markt feat. Steven Brown – Videoclip (2024)
