= Inkberrow Castle =

Castle in Inkberrow, Worcestershire, England

Coordinates: 52.21302°N 1.97654°W

- Inkberrow, Worcestershire, England
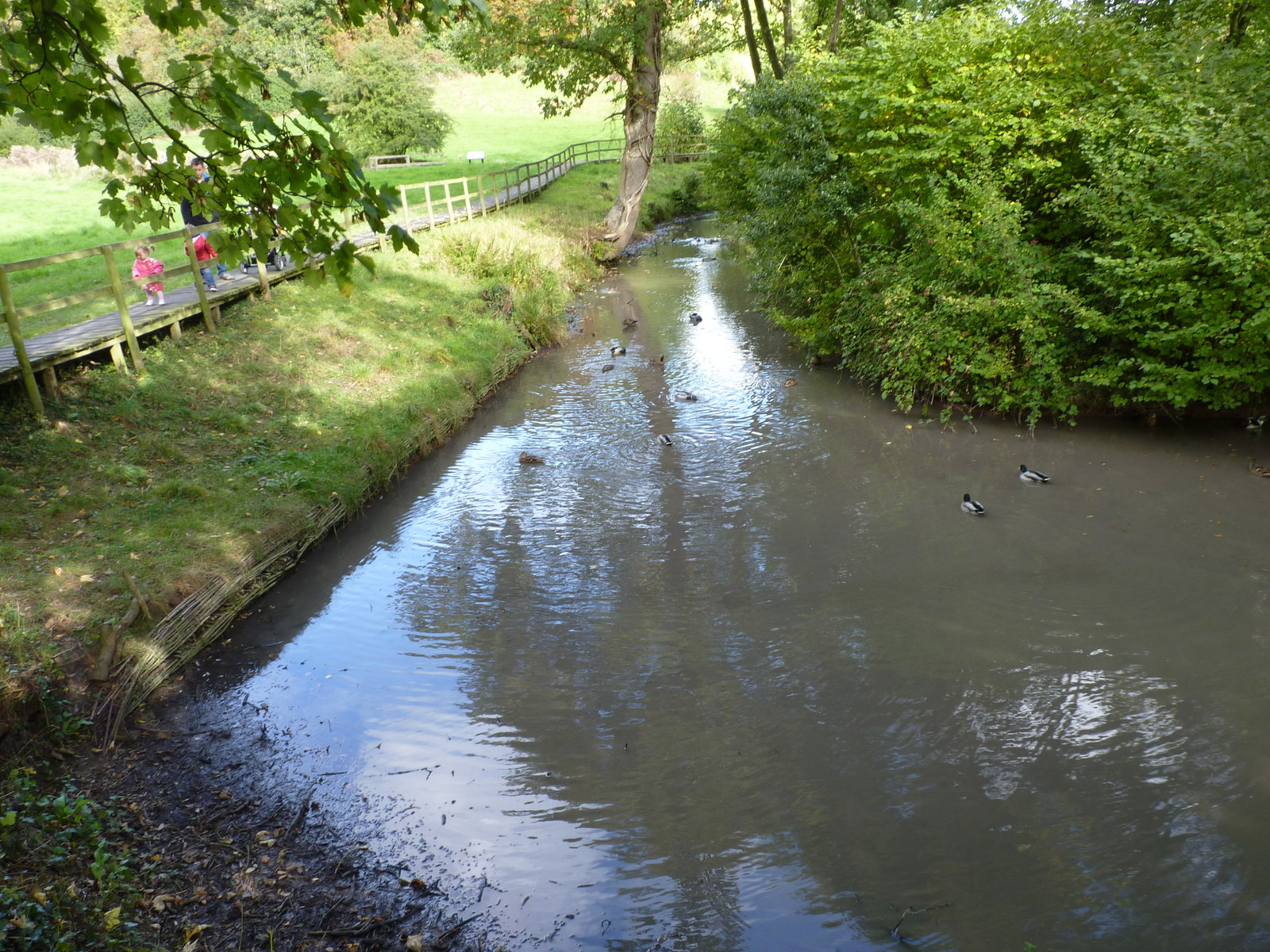
- The remaining moat

Site information
- Type: Castle

Site history
- Built: 1154–1216

Scheduled monument
- Official name: Moated site 150m north east of Inkberrow Church
- Designated: 26 October 1970
- Reference no.: 1018543

Inkberrow Castle was situated in the village of Inkberrow in Worcestershire, England, some 10 km south of Redditch (grid reference SP017572).

It was a castle built between 1154 and 1216 which was destroyed (slighted) in 1233. A moat remains which may be that of the castle or of a later manor house built on or near the site of the castle. Earthworks are also present.

There is a moated site in Inkberrow that is thought to be the castle mentioned in medieval records. It was designated a scheduled monument in 1970.
