= Farewell to the Shade =

Studio album by And Also the Trees
- Released: 1989
- Recorded: 1989 at The Abattoir, Birmingham, England
- Genre: Post-punk, gothic rock
- Label: Reflex
- Producer: Justin Jones, Mark Tibenham, Simon Huw Jones

And Also the Trees chronology
| The Millpond Years (1988) | Farewell to the Shade (1989) | The Evening of the 24th (1991) |

Professional ratings
Review scores
| Source | Rating |
|---|---|
| AllMusic | 4/5 stars |

Farewell to the Shade is the fourth studio album by English band And Also the Trees. It was released in 1989 through record label Reflex.

== Background ==
Farewell to the Shade was recorded in 1989 at The Abattoir in Birmingham, England.

== Release ==
Farewell to the Shade was released in 1989 through record label Reflex. According to AllMusic, it was their only US release to date at the time of the review.

== Musical style ==
Farewell to the Shade has been cited as an example of gothic rock.

== Track listing ==
Side A
| No. | Title | Length |
|---|---|---|
| 1. | "Prince Rupert" | 4:37 |
| 2. | "Macbeth's Head" | 4:08 |
| 3. | "The Nobody Inn" | 0:45 |
| 4. | "Belief in the Rose" | 4:08 |
| 5. | "The Street Organ" | 3:57 |

Side B
| No. | Title | Length |
|---|---|---|
| 1. | "Lady D'Arbanville" | 4:24 |
| 2. | "Misfortunes" | 4:15 |
| 3. | "The Pear Tree" | 3:38 |
| 4. | "Ill Omen" | 3:51 |
| 5. | "The Horse Fair" | 3:34 |

== Personnel ==
- Simon Huw Jones – vocals
- Justin Jones – guitar
- Steven Burrows – bass guitar
- Nick Havas – drums
- Mark Tibenham – keyboards
