= Changeling (album) =

Studio album by Camille O'Sullivan
- Released: 4 February 2012
- Recorded: 2011 at Exchequer Studio, Bunker Studio and Sun Studios in Dublin, Ireland and Ventry Studios and Nutfield Road Studio in London, United Kingdom
- Genre: Rock, pop
- Length: 61:45
- Label: Little Cat
- Producer: Feargal Murray, Eanna Hickey, Camille O'Sullivan

Camille O'Sullivan chronology
A Little Yearning (2002)	Changeling (2012)

Changeling is the second studio album by the Irish rock musician Camille O'Sullivan, released on 4 February 2012 on Little Cat Records.

Recorded throughout 2011 at various recording studios in Dublin with producers and musicians Feargal Murray and Eanna Hickey, Changeling consists entirely of cover versions of songs by artists including Nick Cave, Tom Waits and Radiohead, who O'Sullivan describes as "influences." The album also contains two songs written exclusively for O'Sullivan by collaborator/producer Eanna Hickey and Snow Patrol frontman Gary Lightbody.

Upon its release, Changeling received positive reviews and peaked at number 45 and number 6 in the Irish Albums Chart and Irish Independent Albums Chart, respectively. The album was also supported with a small nationwide tour, launched at Tower Records in Dublin on 16 February, and was followed by a European tour throughout 2012.

== Track listing ==
No.	Title	Writer(s)	Length
1.	"Revelator"	Gillian Welch, David Rawlings	5:14
2.	"True Love Waits"	Thom Yorke, Colin Greenwood, Jonny Greenwood	5:39
3.	"Wake Up"	Win Butler, Régine Chassagne, Richard Reed Parry, William Butler, Tim Kingsbury	4:39
4.	"Lady Grinning Soul"	David Bowie	3:47
5.	"All the World is Green"	Tom Waits, Kathleen Brennan	5:20
6.	"Brompton Oratory"	Nick Cave	4:24
7.	"Hurt"	Trent Reznor	4:20
8.	"Nude"	Yorke, Greenwood, Greenwood	5:34
9.	"U Give Me Everything"	Feargal Murray, Gilbert Linley	3:44
10.	"It Just Won't Do"	Eanna Hickey	3:20
11.	"These Days"	Gary Lightbody	3:54
12.	"Dark Roman Wine"	Lightbody, Jacknife Lee	6:12
13.	"The Ship Song"	Cave	5:37
Total length:			61:45

== Chart positions ==
Chart (2012)	Peak position
Irish Albums Chart	45
Irish Independent Albums Chart	6
