= Mona Bone Jakon =

Studio album by Cat Stevens
- Released: 24 April 1970
- Recorded: January–February 1970
- Studios: Olympic (London); Abbey Road (London)
- Genre: Folk rock
- Length: 35:15
- Labels: Island (UK/Europe); A&M (US/Canada)
- Producer: Paul Samwell-Smith

Cat Stevens chronology
New Masters (1967)	Mona Bone Jakon (1970)	Tea for the Tillerman (1970)

Singles from Mona Bone Jakon
- 1. "Lady D'Arbanville" Released: April 1970

Mona Bone Jakon is the third studio album by singer-songwriter Cat Stevens, released in April 1970 on the Island Records label in the United Kingdom and on A&M in the United States and Canada. It peaked at no. 25 in Australia but did not reach the top 50 in the UK or US.

== Overview ==
After a meteoric start to his career, surprising even his original producer at Deram Records with the hit singles "I Love My Dog", "Matthew and Son", and "I'm Gonna Get Me a Gun", Stevens' debut album, Matthew and Son, began charting. However, after the pressure for a repeat album of the same calibre, Stevens, considered a young teen sensation, was overwhelmed by a new lifestyle as well as the demands of writing, recording, performing, publicity appearances, and touring. His second album was a commercial failure and in the autumn of 1968, he was hospitalized, with a diagnosis of tuberculosis and a collapsed lung. For over a year, while recovering, Stevens virtually disappeared from the British pop scene. Mona Bone Jakon is notable not only for his return but for the emergence of a very different artist. The album sold slowly (at first) but over time has been certified Gold for sales/shipments of more than 500,000 copies in the United States.

== Background ==
During his year of doctor‑ordered bed rest, Stevens wrote a large number of new songs. After recovering, he negotiated his release from Deram Records and began working with former Yardbirds bassist Paul Samwell-Smith, who encouraged a stripped‑down sound. In contrast to his first two albums, the new material featured sparse arrangements built around acoustic guitar and keyboards, supported by a small backing group that included guitarist Alun Davies, bassist John Ryan, and drummer Harvey Burns; Peter Gabriel contributed flute to the track "Katmandu". Samwell‑Smith produced the sessions, with an emphasis on high‑fidelity clarity and a more prominent low‑end presence, reflecting the growing audiophile market of the period. These recordings marked Stevens's transition from pop to a more folk rock‑oriented style at a time when the term "singer‑songwriter" was beginning to enter popular usage. The songs themselves were darker in tone: the madrigal-inspired ballad "Lady D'Arbanville" elevated the tragedy of a lost lover (in this case, Stevens' former girlfriend Patti D'Arbanville) to that of a deceased one, and "Trouble" was a plea to stave off death. There were also lighter songs: "Pop Star" showcased Stevens' dramatic change in voice by satirising the triviality of celebrity.

Though "Lady D'Arbanville" would reach No. 8 on the British charts, Mona Bone Jakon was only a modest success upon its initial release. The album attracted attention, however, in the wake of the commercial breakthrough of its follow-up, Tea for the Tillerman, and with the inclusion of three of its songs ("Trouble", "I Wish, I Wish", and "I Think I See the Light") in Hal Ashby and Colin Higgins's 1971 black comedy, Harold and Maude.

== Origin of title ==
According to a 1972 interview with Stevens, the inspiration for the title was a name he created to describe his penis: "'Mona Bone Jakon' is another name for my penis. It's the name I give it. It's not some sort of secret vocabulary, it's just something I made up."

Journalist Robert Chalmers reiterated this point for a 2003 interview with Yusuf Islam for The Independent on Sunday when he wrote: "When [Stevens] re-emerged in 1969, he had more than 40 new songs and released three triumphant albums in 15 months on Chris Blackwell's Island label: Mona Bone Jakon (his pet word for penis), Tea for the Tillerman and Teaser and the Firecat."

The symbolism of the cover artwork was related to Stevens' original intended title for the album, The Dustbin Cried the Day the Dustman Died.

== Critical reception ==
Professional ratings
Review scores
Source	Rating
Christgau's Record Guide	B−

In a contemporary review for The Village Voice, music critic Robert Christgau gave the album a B+, noting that "this one has a nice post-creative trauma feel, intimate and sensitive. Recommended to singer/songwriter specialists." Later, he revised his review to a B− and expressed a newfound dislike for the songs "Lady D'Arbanville", "Trouble", and "I Wish, I Wish".

In a retrospective review, AllMusic's William Ruhlmann called it "a group of simple, heartfelt songs played in spare arrangements on acoustic guitars and keyboards and driven by a restrained rhythm section". He added that "Stevens' craggy voice, with its odd breaks of tone and occasional huskiness, lent these sometimes sketchy songs depth".

== Track listing ==
All tracks are written by Cat Stevens.

Side One
No.	Title	Length
1.	"Lady D'Arbanville"	3:45
2.	"Maybe You're Right"	3:25
3.	"Pop Star"	4:13
4.	"I Think I See the Light"	3:55
5.	"Trouble"	2:49

Side Two
No.	Title	Length
6.	"Mona Bone Jakon"	1:42
7.	"I Wish, I Wish"	3:50
8.	"Katmandu"	3:22
9.	"Time"	1:26
10.	"Fill My Eyes"	3:00
11.	"Lilywhite"	3:41

== Personnel ==
- Cat Stevens – acoustic guitar (all tracks), keyboards (tracks 1, 2, 4, 5, 7, 8, 10), lead vocals (all tracks), congas (track 6), percussion (track 10)
- Alun Davies – acoustic guitar (tracks 1–5, 7, 10), backing vocals (tracks 3–5, 7, 10)
- John Ryan – double bass (tracks 1–3, 5, 8), bass guitar (tracks 4, 7), backing vocals (track 3)
- Harvey Burns – drums (tracks 1, 2, 4, 5, 7), percussion (track 3)
- Peter Gabriel – flute (track 8)
- Del Newman – string arrangements (tracks 1, 2, 11)
- Paul Samwell-Smith – backing vocals (tracks 1, 3–5, 7, 11), vocal sound effect (track 10)

== Production ==
- Producer – Paul Samwell-Smith
- Engineer – Michael Bobak
- Mixing – Paul Hicks
- Supervisor – Bill Levenson
- Coordinator – Beth Stempel
- Mastering – Ted Jensen
- Design – Roland Young, Mike Diehl
- Illustrations – Cat Stevens
- Photography – Grazia Neri, Richard Stirling

== Charts ==
Chart (1970–1971)	Peak position
Australia (Kent Music Report)	25
UK Albums (OCC)	63
US Top LPs (Billboard)	164

== Certifications and sales ==
Region	Certification	Certified units/sales
France (SNEP)	Gold	100,000^{*}
Germany (BVMI)	Platinum	500,000^{^}
United States (RIAA)	Gold	500,000^{^}
^{*} Sales figures based on certification alone.^{^} Shipments figures based on certification alone.
