= Ernesto Tomasini =

Italian-British actor, singer and writer

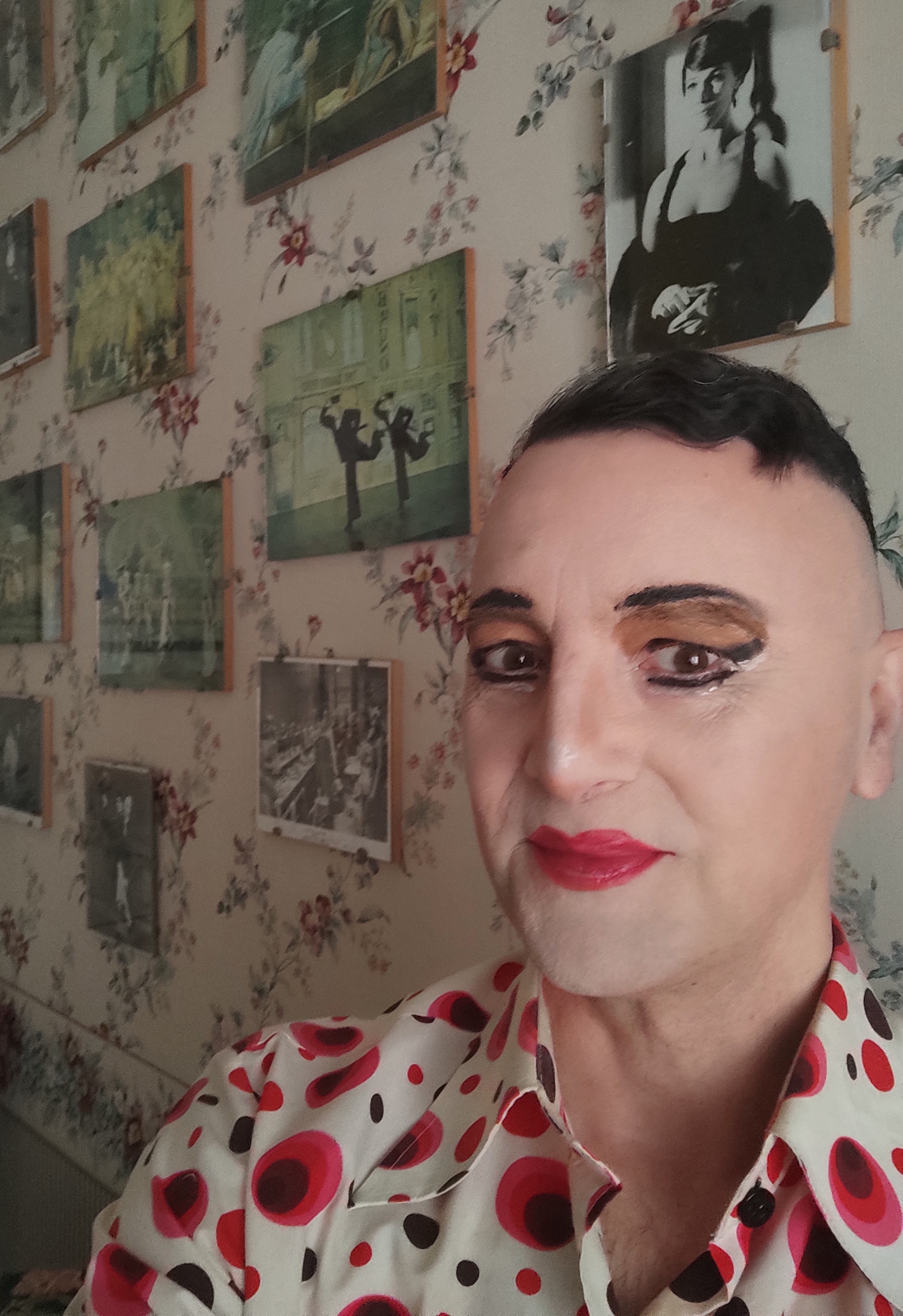
- Born: 15 May 1968 (age 58); Palermo

Ernesto Tomasini (born 15 May 1968, in Palermo, Italy) is an Italian actor/singer living in Britain. His theatre and music careers have developed in parallel over 45 years. A versatile performer, his work spans film, radio, cabaret and performance art, as well as concerts in opera houses and rock venues.

== Early Performances ==
Tomasini began his career at the age of 16 on the Italian comedy circuit. He made his theatrical debut appearing alongside Duilio Del Prete in the national première of Franz Xaver Kroetz’s Death on Christmas Night. He went on to appear in numerous theatre productions and cabaret shows, including as a support act for comedian Nino Frassica and on RAI 3's Premio Anna Magnani. In 1990 he was awarded the prize for best comedy act from Sicily.

== Stage ==
In 1992 Tomasini moved to London, where, after training at the Arts Educational School, he performed leading roles at the Royal National Theatre (The English Man...), in West End shows (Chicago the Musical), with experimental theatre companies (Lindsay Kemp), in Off-West End productions (Blind Summit's Mr China's Son), and in national and international tours (Cabaret (musical)).

Following a six-year period largely devoted to music, he returned to theatre with a series of productions written specifically for him as a leading performer. These include Andrea Cusumano’s Petit Cheval Blanc (International Theatre Festival of Kerala, India, 2013), Roberta Torre’s Aida (Teatro Biondo, Palermo, 2014) and Il Mutamento’s Mamma Schiavona (Teatro Astra, Turin, 2014). In 2026 he appeared in the casts of I poeti non cadono in piedi by Franco Maresco (Teatro Mercadante, Naples, 2026) and Zombie Ant Fungus (Royal Institution, London, 2026).

Throughout his career, he has created several theatre productions as writer, director, producer and performer. He first attracted wider attention with True or Falsetto? A Secret History of the Castrati, presented at the Edinburgh Festival. Written by Time Out critic Lucy Powell, the show subsequently ran in London for two seasons and toured internationally in three languages. This was followed by The Veiled Screen: A Secret History of Hollywood!, written by Tomasini and presented in two London runs in 2006 with support from the Arts Council of England. In Italy he wrote Beato chi ci crede (Teatro Out Off, Milan, 2017) and founded the first queer theatre company in Sicily, with productions presented by Palermo's Teatro Bastardo Festival.

As an avant-garde comedian and cabaret artist, he has performed in theatres, museums, nightclubs and cultural institutes in 17 countries, and has collaborated with artists including Stephen Montague, Ron Athey, Carlos Motta and with the Resonance Radio Orchestra.

Tomasini has also been active in the fashion world, performing at runway shows by hat designer Nasir Mazhar during London Fashion Week in 2008 and 2009, and for Carlo Volpi at Pitti Uomo in 2017.

== Music ==
For over 20 years he has lent his wide vocal range to experimental music, singing an eclectic repertoire written for him by a multitude of musicians, becoming an international cult figure. He also performs a more classical repertoire, often alongside opera stars, in opera houses and concert halls. A wide vocal range combined with his melodramatic delivery have interested the press: Frontiers magazine described him as "the most exciting and flamboyant personality to shake up the opera world since Klaus Nomi" and Italian newspaper La Repubblica called him a "prominent figure in avant-garde circuits with his seducing high voice reminiscent of those belonging to evirated singers".

In 2025 he returned to London's Crazy Coqs with a new recital and sang in Franco Maresco's Jazz nights at Teatro Santa Cecilia in Palermo. In 2024 he was singer and actor in “Derek Jarman’s Blue Live” by composer Simon Fisher Turner, at the National Cinema Museum in Turin, Italy. In 2023 he took a new one-man concert to the Danae Festival in Milan and played a major role in the Franco Zeffirelli centenary production of Donizetti‘s “La fille du regiment”, at the Teatro Massimo Bellini in Catania, directed by Marco Gandini, musical direction Giuliano Carella, with John Osborn. In 2022 he sang Cabaret chansons from the early 20th Century, directed by Omer Meir Wellber, at the Teatro Massimo in Palermo and at the Toscanini Festival in Parma and Reggio Emilia. In 2020 he was among the highlights at the end of year concert of the Teatro Massimo in Palermo, also under the baton of maestro Wellber, alongside soprano Carmen Giannattasio and baritone Markus Werba. 2020 also saw the release of a second compilation album by the Lacerba label in which Ernesto appears alongside Myss Keta, Federico Fiumani, Mirco Magnani and others.

Other collaborations include Marc Almond, the late "father of industrial music" Peter Christopherson (founder of Coil, Throbbing Gristle and Psychic TV), Current 93 (he was special guest at their first Queen Elizabeth Hall concert, alongside Anohni), electronic producer Shackleton (who wrote for him "Devotional Songs“, the critically acclaimed live show and album, which was among the best of 2016 for The Wire, The Quietus and many more), producer Man Parrish (on two tracks in compilation albums, one with Joey Arias),Julia Kent (Antony & the Johnsons), Andrew Liles (Nurse With Wound), Rolo McGinty of The Woodentops, Spiritual Front, members of Larsen, Othon, Adam Donen and José Macabra, with whom he opened the 2011 Drop Dead Festival in Berlin. Tomasini is singer/songwriter of the prog-rock band Almagest!, co-founded with Fabrizio Modonese Palumbo, with which he tours extensively, appearing in venues like the Volksbuehne in Berlin and festivals like the Kurt Weill Fest.

He has sung his repertoire in London venues like the Royal Albert Hall (main house and Elgar Room), Purcell Room, National Theatre, Roundhouse, Cadogan Hall, Tate Britain, National Portrait Gallery, and in historical theatres, museums and churches around the world. As a recording artist, he has appeared on 18 albums, six singles, six music videos and two soundtracks, including one for a film by Bruce LaBruce.

== Radio, Cinema and TV ==
On radio he has sung, acted and been interviewed across all BBC stations, as well as on Classic FM, RAI Radio3, Radio Nacional de España, Radio New Zealand, Radiotelevisione svizzera and major broadcasters in France, Germany, Brazil and the US.

In film, he has appeared in features for Pathé and Universal Pictures, working with directors such as Alfonso Cuarón and Peter Hewitt. The short documentary Ernesto Tomasini: One Life to Live (2018) premiered on Dangerous Minds before being screened at the Sicilia Queer Filmfest, as part of a retrospective on his career. His Italian film debut came with Ciurè (2022), in which he plays a major role, followed by his leading performance in Quir (2024), an award-winning Swiss production, that premiered at the Taormina Film Festival ahead of its theatrical release in September 2025. His latest film, Bravo Bene!, by Italian cinema maestro Franco Maresco, was in competition at the Venice Film Festival 2025. As a voiceover artist, he has collaborated with Oscar-winning filmmakers like James Ivory, Ridley Scott, and Kevin Spacey.

His UK television work includes appearances on BBC, ITV, and Sky productions. In 2013 he was at the centre of the documentary Heavenly Voices – The Legacy of Farinelli (2013), performing alongside the world’s leading countertenors. In Italy, he has been frequently interviewed on RAI 3 about his theatrical work and, in April 2025, he appeared on the same channel, in the cast of Ricordando Letizia a short film by Franco Maresco.

In 2015, he was the face of the House of Fraser lipstick campaign, and in 2016, he starred in Symphony to a Lost Generation, the world’s first holographic opera.

== Other ==
In 2012 he was included in the Theatre/Music section of Eccellenza Italiana (Italian Excellency, with presentation by the President of the Republic of Italy, Giorgio Napolitano), for representing Italy in the world. In 2013 he was awarded the prize "Sicilian in the World" and in 2016 received the keys to the city by the mayor of his hometown of Palermo.
A lecturer on theatre history and techniques he has given master-classes to drama students in England, Spain and Mexico. Tomasini is the only Italian to have given a masterclass at RADA Royal Academy of Dramatic Art.
His work and performance style are discussed in four books and an academic essay.
For two years (2010–2012) Ernesto was the London correspondent of the Italian magazine Musical!.

== Discography ==
- Black Widow (album, 2007) Beta Lactam-ring Records
- Black Sea (album, 2007) Beta Lactam-ring Records
- When I Leave You (single, 2007) Othon Mataragas
- Canes Venatici (album, 2007) Blossoming Noise
- Otto; or, Up With Dead People (soundtrack album, 2008) Crippled Dick Hot Wax!
- Digital Angel (album, 2008) Durtro Jnana
- The Hunting Dogs of Boötes the Herdsman (album, 2010) Chew-z
- Last Night I Paid To Close My Eyes (single, 2011) Cherry Red/SFE
- Impermanence (album, 2011) Cherry Red/SFE
- Impermanence (single, 2012) Cherry Red/SFE
- Düde (album, 2012) Tin Angel Records
- Messier Objects (album 2013) Tourette Records
- InSonar, L'Enfant et le Ménure (album, 2013) Lizard Records
- Dawn Yet To Come (single, 2014) Cherry Red/SFE
- Pineal (album, 2014) Cherry Red/SFE
- Devotional Songs (album, 2016) Honest Jon
- Madame E (album, 2017) Undogmatisch
- Star (album, 2017) Parrish Digital
- Fun House Mirrors (album, 2017) Backwards Records
- Plaisir (single, 2018) Undogmatisch
- LB/R La Bellezza Riunita (album, 2018) Lacerba
- Amour Braque (album, 2018) Prophecy
- La Bellezza Eccetera (album, 2020) Lacerba
- Live at Rough Trade (live albumm, 2022) Andrew Liles
- Quir (soundtrack album, 2025) FM Records

== Bibliography ==
- Autori vari. Incontroazione 70/96 – 20 anni + 1, Theatrum Mundi Edizioni 1997
- Marinelli, Manlio. Per un teatro degli spazi, Theatrum Mundi Edizioni, 2001
- Scarlini, Luca. Lustrini per il regno dei cieli. Bollati Boringhieri, 2008
- Autori vari. Teatro Libero. Quarant’anni: Le creazioni di Beno Mazzone e Lia Chiappara, 1969–2009, Theatrum Mundi Edizioni 2009
- Guarracino, Serena (2010). La primadonna all'opera: scrittura e performance nel mondo anglofono. Tangram Ediz. Scientifiche. ISBN 978-88-6458-013-5.
- Tomaz Pires, Luìs. The Julie Andrews Visual Encyclopedia. Lisbon: Pires, 2011
- Cazzato, Luigi (cur). Orizzonte sud. Besa, 2011
- Jackson, Stanley. Get Me a Celebrity. Ecademy Press, 2011
- Guarracino, Serena. Donne di passioni, Editoria&Spettacolo, 2011
- Palumbo Crocco, Cristina (with a preface by the President of the Republic of Italy Giorgio Napolitano). Eccellenza Italiana. Rubbettino, 2012
- Pajdic, Predrag & Nash, JL. Beneath the Shadows the Soul Walks. The Pandorian, 2012
- Johnson, Dominic (cur). Pleading in the Blood: The Art and Performances of Ron Athey. Intellect Live, 2013
- Esposito, Igor. Torre, Roberta. Tomasini, Ernesto. Aida, il grande circo dell'aldilà. Glifo Edizioni, 2014
- Frignani, Enrico. Sofa. Frignani, 2015
- Cresti, Antonello. Solchi sperimentali Italia. Crac Edizioni, 2015
- Arrevad, Magnus. Boy Story. Red Room Books, 2015
- Pegg, Nicholas. The Complete David Bowie. Titan Books, 2016
- McLeod, Jamie. I Created Me. Timeless, 2017
- McAllister-Viel, Tara. Training Actors' Voices. Routledge, 2018
- Sartorius, Benedikt. Listen Up! 313 Popletter. Edition Taberna Kritika, 2021
- Pegg, Nicholas (Goffette, Christophe translator). Tout Bowie. Nouveau Monde (French translation of “The Complete David Bowie”), 2021
- Autori vari. Andrea Cusumano: Raumdramaturgie. SilvanaEditoriale, 2023
- Giunta, Andrea. Diversidad y arte latinoamericano. Siglo Veintiuno Editores, 2024
- Various authors. Andrea Cusumano: Biawe. BWA (PL), 2025
- Modonese Palumbo, Fabrizio. Puopolo, Francesca Sebastian. Tomasini, Ernesto. Blue, Derek Jarman. AxisAxis, 2026

== Selection of Work in Variety, Cabaret and Performance Art ==
- The LA Italian Revue, Los Angeles (variety – 1984, USA)
- The Victoria Series, Palermo (cabaret – 1988/93, I)
- Support for Nino Frassica, Palermo (cabaret – 1991, I)
- The Lenny Beige Show at the Regency Rooms, London (variety – 1998, UK)
- The Amazing Tomasini at the Tron Theatre, Glasgow (cabaret – 2001, UK)
- Stars Fall From Heaven at the Colourscape Festival, London (performance art – 2006, UK)
- The History of Ecstasy at MADRE Museum, Naples (performance art – 2009, I)
- Tomasini/Macabra Trans4Leben at the MILKandLEAD art gallery, London (performance art – 2011, UK)
- Lascia o raddoppia?, London (performance art – 2011, UK)
- Alternative Miss Liverpool (cabaret – 2011, UK)
- Franko B's Untouchable, London (cabaret −2013, UK)
- New Year Celebrations in Piazza Politeama, Palermo (variety – 2015, I)
- Bowie Night at Ace Hotel, London (with Lindsay Kemp, Marc Almond, Holly Johnson. variety – 2016, UK)
- Heavenly Voices/Sensual Bodies at the Teatro Massimo, Palermo (illustrated lecture – 2017, I)
- Franco Maresco's "Io e il Jazz" (6 episodes) at Real Teatro Santa Cecilia for the Brass Group, Palermo (variety - 2025, I)

== Selection of Theatre Work ==
- Morte nella notte di Natale (play – 1988, I)
- Ballarò (play – 1990, I)
- Nasci lu iornu (musical – 1993, I)
- Volti Lunari (play – 1994, UK)
- Reunion in Genthin (play – 1995, UK)
- Grand Hotel – The Musical (musical – 1995, UK)
- The Tempest (play – 1995, UK)
- Varietè (dark operetta – 1996/97, UK)
- The Other Woman (compilation musical – 1998/99, UK)
- The Conquering Hero of Seville (play – 1999, UK)
- Cabaret Galactica (musical - 2000, UK)
- Mr China's Son (multimedia play with music – 2002, UK)
- True or Falsetto? A Secret History of the Castrati (one man musical – 2002–2007, UK + world tour)
- The Englishman Sits in a Caravan at St Osyth/Singing (opera – 2003, UK)
- Cabaret – The Musical (musical – 2003, UK)
- Chicago – The Musical (musical – 2004/05, UK)
- The Veiled Screen: A Secret History of Hollywood (one man musical – 2005/06, UK)
- Camurrìa! (musical – 2008, UK)
- Petit Cheval Blanc (play – 2013, India)
- Aida (musical – 2014, I)
- Mamma Schiavona (play with music – 2014, I)
- Beato chi ci crede (musical – 2017, I)
- Lunaria (play with music - 2023, I)
- La signora Palermo ha due figlie (play with music - 2024, I)
- Serva delle mie brame (play - 2025, I)
- I poeti non cadono in piedi (play -2026, I)

== Selection of TV, Film and Radio Work ==
- Premio Anna Magnani (RAI 3, TV – 1990, I)
- Woman's Hour (BBC Radio 4 – 1998, UK)
- Outlook (BBC World Radio – 2002)
- Thunderpants (Pathè, Film – 2002, UK)
- Walking the Outer Road (Radio New Zealand – 2003, NZ)
- Crowded Skies (BBC2, TV – 2003, UK)
- Dream Team (Sky, TV – 2004, UK)
- The Bottle Factory Outing (BBC Radio 4 – 2005, UK)
- Children of Men (Universal Pictures, Film – 2006, USA)
- Siglo 21 (Radio 3 Nacional de España – 2007, Es)
- Otto; or, Up with Dead People (Film soundtrack – 2008, Ger)
- Stoo Kuinnutu (Reverso, music video – 2009, Ger)
- Othon & Tomasini en vivo a la Bienal de Zamora (Radio Nacional de España – 2009, Es)
- Forget Me Not (Quicksilver Films, Film – 2010, UK)
- Carne cruda (Othon & Tomasini en vivo y entrevista) (Radio Nacional de España – 2010, Es)
- Last Night I Paid To Close My Eyes (Cherry Red/SFE, music video – 2011, UK/Dm)
- Impermanence (Cherry Red/SFE, music video – 2012, UK/Dm)
- Heavenly Voices: The Legacy of Farinelli (Tico Films, documentary – 2013, EU)
- Ciurè (Social Star, Film - 2022, I)
- Quir (Soap Factory, Docu-film - 2024, CH)
- Ricordando Letizia (Fuori orario/Rai 3, TV - 2025, I)
- Un film fatto per Bene (Lucky Red, Film - 2025, I)

== Selection of Concerts and Recitals ==
- COPA at the Royal Albert Hall (concert – 2001, UK)
- State of the Nation at the Purcell Room (concert – 2002, UK)
- Andrew Liles + Ernesto Tomasini & Nurse With Wound at the Sala Apolo, Barcelona (concert – 2007, Es)
- Othon & Tomasini's First European tour (concert – 2007/08 EU)
- The Angelic Conversation with Peter Christopherson's The Threshold HouseBoys Choir in Turin (live soundtrack – 2008, I)
- Current 93 at Queen Elizabeth Hall, London, with guests Antony, Marc Almond and Ernesto Tomasini (concert – 2008, UK)
- Andrew Liles + Ernesto Tomasini & Nurse With Wound at the Wet Sounds Festival, London (concert – 2008, UK)
- Palumbo/Tomasini's Canes Venatici live at the Auditòrio de Serralves, Porto (concert – 2008, PT)
- London Fashion Week, Nasir Mazhar spring show, London (recital – 2009, UK)
- Ernesto Tomasini sings: Othon, Canes Venatici and Andrew Liles at the PRE Final Fest, Rome (concert – 2009, I)
- Othon & Tomasini at The Queen Elizabeth Hall (The Front Room), London (recital – 2009, UK)
- Othon & Tomasini special guests at Marc Almond's Roundhouse concert, London (concert – 2009, UK)
- Othon & Tomasini in the West End (Leicester Square Theatre), London (concert – 2010, UK)
- Othon & Tomasini at the National Portrait Gallery, London (concert – 2010, UK)
- Palumbo/Tomasini's Canes Venatici live at the Volksbuehne, Berlin (concert – 2010, D)
- Othon & Tomasini at the Teatro Lara, Madrid (concert – 2010, Es)
- Palumbo/Tomasini's Almagest! at the Kampnagel, Hamburg (concert – 2011, D)
- Palumbo/Tomasini's Almagest! at the Natural History Museum, Turin (concert – 2011, I)
- Tomasini/Macabra Trans4Leben at the Drop Dead Festival, Berlin (concert – 2011, D)
- Othon & Tomasini at Chelsea Theatre, Impermanence (concert – 2011 UK)
- Othon & Tomasini Live in London at St Leonard's Church Shoreditch (concert – 2012 UK)
- Almagest! at Kurt Weill Fest (concert – 2013, D)
- Poems After Lorca at the Cadogan Hall, London (concert −2014, UK)
- Pineal at the Garage, London (concert – 2014, UK)
- Deliquium at Electrowerks, London (concert – 2015, UK)
- TG Body Probe at the Coronet, London (concert – 2015, UK)
- Ninja Tunes at St John at Hackney, London (concert – 2015, UK)
- Shackleton/Tomasini at CaixaForum, Madrid and Barcelona (concert – 2015, Es)
- Tomasini Masterclass at RADA, Royal Academy of Dramatic Arts (recital – 2016, UK)
- Ernesto Tomasini Live, Teatro Biondo, Palermo (recital – 2016, UK)
- Shackleton/Tomasini at Arma17, Moscow (concert – 2016, RU)
- Shackleton/Tomasini at EYE, Amsterdam (concert – 2016, NL)
- Concerto di San Silvestro at Teatro Massimo, Palermo (concert - 2020, I)
- Cabaret! Toscanini Festival, Reggio Emilia and Teatro Massimo, Palermo (concert - 2022, I)
- Degenerata! at Mosso for Danae Festival, Milan (concert - 2023, I)
- Derek Jarman's "Blue" Live with Simon Fisher Turner at the Cinema Museum, Turin (live soundtrack - 2024, I)
- Degenerata! at Crazy Coqs, London (concert - 2024, UK)
- Franco Maresco's "Io e il Jazz", ep.3 at Real Teatro Santa Cecilia for the Brass Group, Palermo (concert - 2024, I)
- Exaggerata! at Crazy Coqs, London (concert - 2025, UK)
