= Camille O'Sullivan =

Irish musician

- Born: London, England
- Origin: Cork, Ireland
- Genres: Alternative rock, baroque pop
- Occupations: Singer, musician, actress
- Instruments: Vocals, piano, keyboards
- Years active: 2000–present
- Website: camilleosullivan.com

Camille O'Sullivan is an Irish singer, musician, and actress. She is known for her unique, dramatic musical style and covers of artists such as Radiohead, Tom Waits, David Bowie, Nick Cave, Sinéad O'Connor, and Shane McGowan of The Pogues.

== Early life, education, and architecture ==
Camille O'Sullivan was born in London, England, to an Irish father from Cork, Denis O'Sullivan, and Marie-José, a French artist from Bordeaux. Denis is a former Formula Two racing driver and the first Irish world champion sailor in the Laser class of yachts, after taking up sailing at the age of 40. He also took the national team to the Barcelona Olympics in 1992, and came third in the world when he sailed in Buenos Aires. He was Ireland's most senior representative at the 2018 Laser Masters World Championships.

O'Sullivan grew up in the town of Passage West, County Cork. After finishing secondary school, she studied fine art at the National College of Art and Design in Dublin, during which time one of her paintings was selected for the Royal Hibernian Academy exhibition. but dropped out of her course after a year. On her parents' advice, she enrolled in University College Dublin (UCD) and studied architecture for four years. Whilst in UCD, she became known as "the singing architect" as she performed in all available university productions and was a member of Dramsoc. In 1992, she appeared in a play about Cole Porter that played to an audience of five people. In 1994, O'Sullivan performed in Jacques Brel is Alive and Well and Living in Paris at UCD.

O'Sullivan spent a year in Berlin, Germany, where she worked at an architect's office. During her time in Berlin, she regularly attended local cabaret clubs. Upon returning to Ireland, she met Berlin-born Agnes Bernelle, a mentor who encouraged her to sing. She carried on with her studies, performing at night in various theatres and clubs around Dublin such as Da Club, Cobalt Cafe, Bewley's theatre, and Andrews Lane Theatre, earning the moniker "the singing architect".

In 1996 she graduated from UCD with first class honours and the highest marks at the university in a decade. O'Sullivan then continued to work as an architect, winning an Architectural Association of Ireland award in the process, while singing in clubs at night.

She met Shane MacGowan of The Pogues during this time, and was invited to perform with them on stage and tour with them. Not long afterwards, she met Sinead O'Connor.

== Performing career ==
In August 2004, O'Sullivan performed in a show called La Clique: A Sideshow Burlesque in The Famous Spiegeltent at the Edinburgh Fringe Festival, singing songs by Kirsty MacColl and Marlene Dietrich. Although she lost a lot of money performing at the Fringe, she was spotted there by Scottish actor Ewen Bremner in the show, he recommender her to director Stephen Frears. Frears cast her as the vaudeville star and lead singer Jane in his 2005 film Mrs Henderson Presents, opposite Judi Dench and Bob Hoskins. In the film, she sings duets with Will Young.

In 2005 she played "showgirl, courtesan, political adviser, gold prospector and author" Lola Montez in the historical documentary Her Name was Lola, directed by Anne Roper for RTÉ's Hidden History series.

O'Sullivan said in 2006:

I feel it's necessary to not just do things to please ... I sometimes worried about that in the past. I thought, 'If I don’t want to alienate people, I shouldn’t perform difficult provocative dark songs'. But I would have given up if I’d stayed doing Dietrich and Piaf in a studied way, that cafe-cabaret version, where you're making it easy instead of pushing yourself.

In 2007, she appeared as "Beggar Woman" in a production of Sweeney Todd, The Demon Barber of Fleet Street at the Gate Theatre in Dublin. Later that year her three-week show at Edinburgh Fringe sold out, and she then toured Sydney, Toronto, and New York. In July 2008 she played at Glastonbury Festival, performing David Bowie's "Moonage Daydream" wearing only a red corset and wellies. She then performed at Queen's Hall, Edinburgh for the Fringe, before embarking on her first full tour of the UK.

O'Sullivan is known for her dramatic musical style and covers of artists such as Radiohead, Tom Waits, David Bowie, Nick Cave, Jacques Brel, and Edith Piaf.

In July 2024 O'Sullivan launched her new show, Loveletter, at Edinburgh Fringe, before touring the UK and Ireland. March 2025 O'Sullivan toured Australia and New Zealand. In an interview about the show, which was created to honour her friends Sinead O'Connor and Shane MacGowan (who had both died in 2023) she said that this was her first time singing Irish music. This would be her 24th visit to Australia, the first having been in 2004. In early March she performed the show at Her Majesty's Theatre in Adelaide, Australia, as part of the Adelaide Festival to kick off the tour.

== Personal life ==
O'Sullivan has a sister, Vicky.

In 1999, O'Sullivan was involved in a near-fatal car crash, in which she suffered a head fracture, her pelvis was fractured in six places, her hips displaced and the tendons in her hand were shredded. It was months before she could walk again, and she was hospitalised for a year; she still has a metal plate in her pelvis. The accident encouraged her to follow her dream of singing and she performed her first show after the accident while still on crutches.

O'Sullivan was in a relationship with The Waterboys' lead singer Mike Scott, with whom she has a daughter, Leila Élodie born in 2013. Since 2014 and as of January 2023 she is in a relationship with actor Aidan Gillen.

== Discography ==
=== Studio albums ===
- A Little Yearning (2002)
- Changeling (2012)

=== Live albums ===
- La Fille Du Cirque (2005)
- Plays Brel Live (2005)
- Live at the Olympia (2008)
- Camille Sings Cave Live (2019)

== Filmography ==
O'Sullivan has appeared in:

- Mrs Henderson Presents (2005)
- Her Name was Lola
- Rebellion (2016)
- Pickups (2017), written by Aidan Gillen and Jamie Thraves, directed by Thraves
