= Chelsea Theatre =

Theatre in London, England

- The Chelsea Theatre
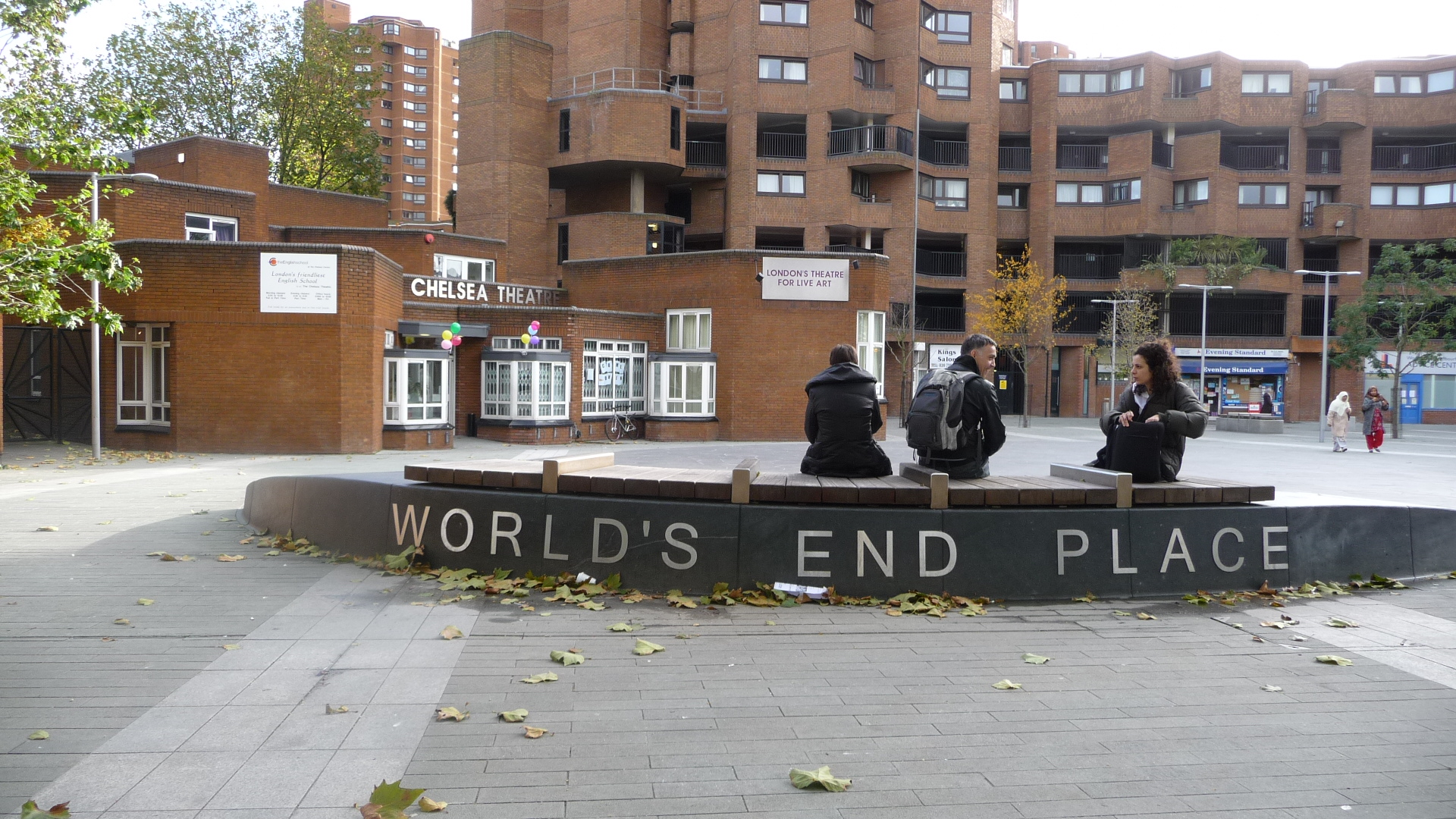
- Interactive map of Chelsea Theatre
- Location: Chelsea; London, SW10; United Kingdom
- Coordinates: 51.481389°N 0.179722°W
- Capacity: 120 seats
- Type: Theatre
- Production: Short seasons
- Public transit: West Brompton

Construction
- Opened: Reopened 2020
- Closed: 2017

Website
- chelseatheatre.org.uk

Chelsea Theatre is an independent studio theatre located on the Kings Road in the Royal Borough of Kensington and Chelsea, London. After a major renovation, Chelsea Theatre returned in 2020, reborn as a state-of-the-art creative and community hub, serving the World's End, Cremorne and beyond. Its mission is to act as an incubator of creativity and culture for, and from, all parts of the community, Greater London and the rest of the world.

Chelsea Theatre is a flexible space where community, artists and audiences can connect and explore their creativity. It offers a range of spaces: learning and rehearsal studios, meeting rooms, indoor and outdoor exhibition and performance venues, a community café and terrace bar, as well as a 120-seat theatre and cinema. The building is fully accessible.
