= Justin Jones (guitarist) =

English rock guitarist (born 1964)

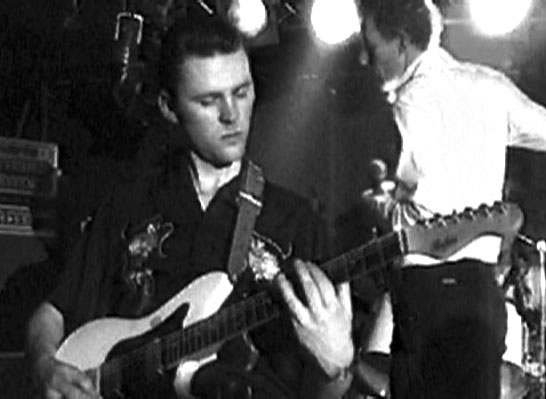

Background information
- Born: 9 January 1964 (age 61); Birmingham, England
- Origin: Worcestershire, England
- Genres: Post-punk, alternative rock, electronic
- Occupations: Musician, guitarist

Justin Jones (born 9 January 1964) is an English rock guitarist and musician best known for his work with And Also the Trees.

== Biography ==
Born in Birmingham, Justin Jones grew up in rural Worcestershire. There he founded And Also the Trees together with Nick and Graham Havas and his brother Simon Huw Jones. Over an extensive career of 13 albums his mandolin-like guitar sound has become trademark of And Also the Trees. Furthermore, he produced their albums Angelfish and Silver Soul.

Jones also was a member of the ambient dub related music project Gods of Luxury (alias G.O.L.) and appeared on various collaborations. In 2011 he provided guest guitar on the album Impermanence by Othon Mataragas, followed by an intimate concert at Chelsea Theatre to launch the album. Three years later Jones played guitar on Marc Almond's album The Dancing Marquis.

== Discography ==
=== Miscellaneous ===
- 1989: And Also the Trees – Farewell to the Shade (Track Lady D'Arbanville, Producer), (CD, LP, Album, Reflex Records)
- 1995: And Also the Trees – Angelfish (Producer), (CD, Album, Mezentian)
- 1998: And Also the Trees – Silver Soul (Producer), (CD, Album, And Also the Trees)
- 2011: Othon – Impermanence (Track "Impermanence +", Guitar), (CD, Album, Strike Force Entertainment)
- 2014: Marc Almond – The Dancing Marquis (Track "Love Is Not On Trial", Guitar), (CD, Album, Strike Force Entertainment / Cherry Red Records)
