= Simon Huw Jones =

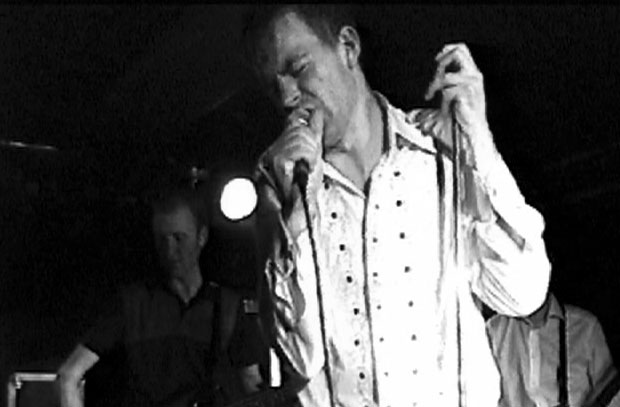

Background information
- Born: 1 June 1960 (age 66); Birmingham, England
- Origin: Worcestershire, England
- Genres: Post-punk, alternative rock, electronic
- Occupations: Musician, singer, photographer

Simon Huw Jones or Simon Jones (born 1 June 1960) is an English vocalist, lyricist and photographer, best known as the singer with the band And Also the Trees.

== Biography ==
Simon Huw Jones was born in Birmingham, England in 1960 but grew up in rural Worcestershire where, in 1979, he formed the alternative rock band And Also the Trees with his guitarist brother Justin Jones. In the following years the band toured extensively in Europe and the United States.

Jones now lives in Geneva, Switzerland where he founded, together with Bernard Trontin (a member of the Swiss band The Young Gods), the electro/ambient project November. In 2006 they released an album under the same name.

In May 2012 Jones recorded the vocal for the 'electric version' (for 17 electric guitars, percussion and voice) of "How we tried a new combination of notes to show the invisible" a piece of music written by the French guitarist and composer Olivier Mellano under commission for the Orchestre Symphonique de Bretagne. The piece, written in four movements, was performed along with the original version for full orchestra and soprano and a further 'electro' transcription at the Opéra de Rennes as part of the Rencontres Trans Musicales 2012.

After leaving school, Jones studied photography in Great Barr, Birmingham then worked in the Cadbury Schweppes photographic studios. He has continued to take and exhibit photographs, most notably when German multi media artist John Bock used five of his pictures whilst curating the FischGrätenMelkStand exhibition in the Temporäre Kunsthalle Berlin in 2010. His photographs have also been used as covers for And Also the Trees albums and singles.

== Discography ==
=== November ===
- 2006: November – November (All tracks, lyrics and vocals), (Shayo, 2006)
- 2019: November – November 2nd (All tracks, lyrics and vocals), (Gentlemen Recordings, 2019)

=== Miscellaneous ===
- 2011: Lena Fennell – Nauticus (Tracks "Nauticus" and "Forgot The Silence", vocals), (Irascible Distribution, 2011)
- 2011: Goodbye Ivan – Ten Inch Interval (Track "The Visit (Anxiolytikk)", lyrics and vocals), (Shayo, 2011)
- 2012: Various Artists – Last Summer (Track "The Lockkeeper's Cottage", vocals), (Les Disques du 7ème Ciel, 2012)
- 2012: Olivier Mellano – "How We Tried A New Combination of Notes To Show The Invisible Or Even The Embrace of Eternity" (CD 2–1 to CD 2–4, voice), (Naive, 2012)
