= A Christmas Carol =

1843 novella by Charles Dickens

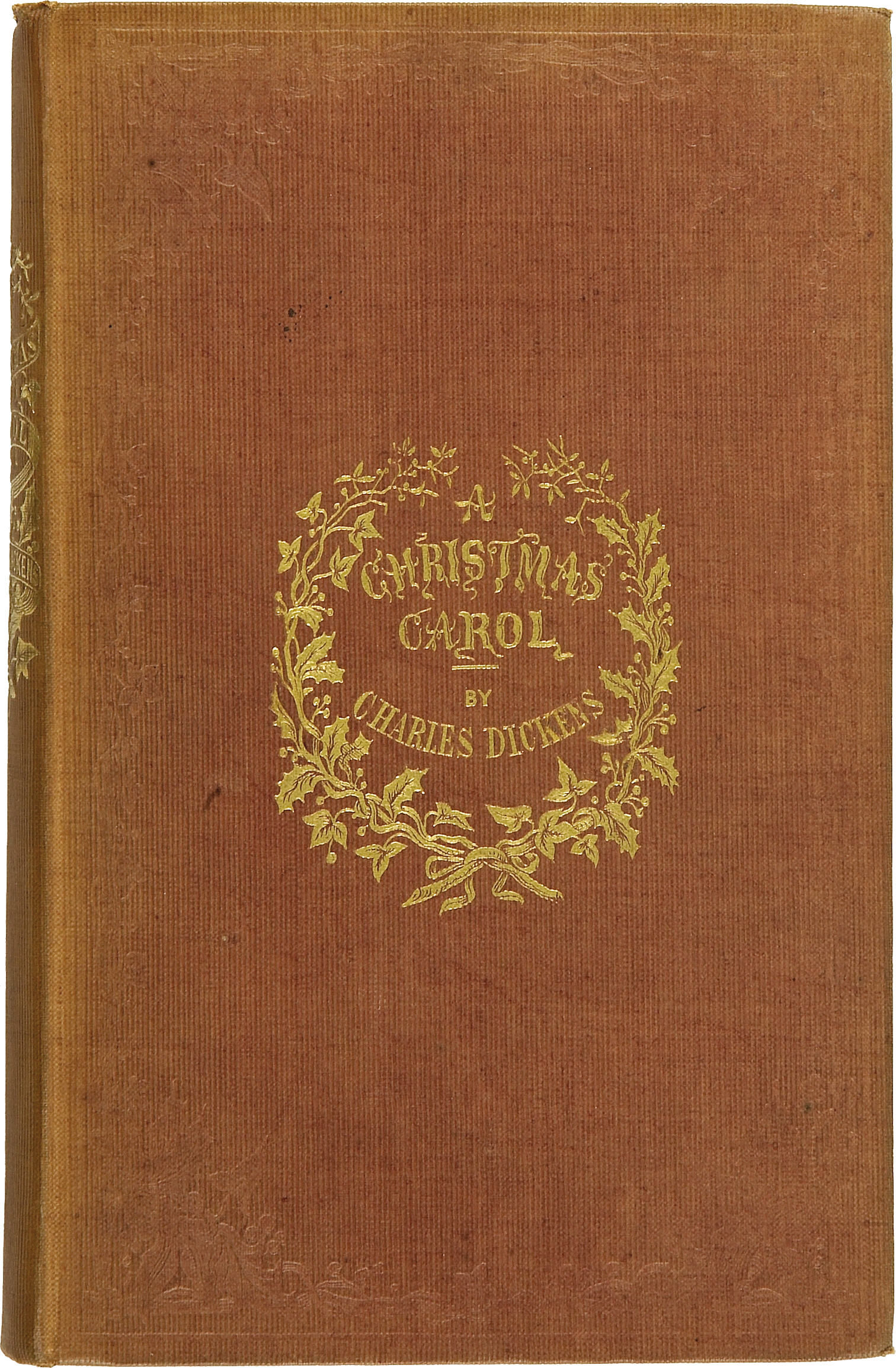
- First edition cover (1843)
- Author: Charles Dickens
- Original title: A Christmas Carol. In Prose. Being a Ghost Story of Christmas.
- Illustrator: John Leech
- Published: 19 December 1843; 182 years ago
- Publisher: Chapman & Hall
- Publication place: United Kingdom
- Pages: 166
- Text: A Christmas Carol at Wikisource

A Christmas Carol. In Prose. Being a Ghost Story of Christmas, commonly known as A Christmas Carol, is a novella by Charles Dickens, first published in London by Chapman & Hall in 1843 and illustrated by John Leech. It recounts the story of Ebenezer Scrooge, an elderly miser who is visited by the ghost of his former business partner Jacob Marley and the spirits of Christmas Past, Present and Yet to Come. In the process, Scrooge is transformed into a kinder, gentler man.

Dickens wrote A Christmas Carol during a period when the British were exploring and re-evaluating past Christmas traditions, including carols, and newer customs such as cards and Christmas trees. He was influenced by the experiences of his own youth and by the Christmas stories of other authors, including Washington Irving and Douglas Jerrold. Dickens had written three Christmas stories prior to the novella, and was inspired following a visit to the Field Lane Ragged School, one of several establishments for London's street children. The treatment of the poor and the ability of a selfish man to redeem himself by transforming into a more sympathetic character are the key themes of the story. There is discussion among academics as to whether this is a fully secular story or a Christian allegory.

Published on 19 December, the first edition sold out by Christmas Eve; by the end of 1844 thirteen editions had been released. Most critics reviewed the novella favourably. The story was illicitly copied in January 1844; Dickens took legal action against the publishers, who went bankrupt, further reducing Dickens's small profits from the publication. He subsequently wrote four other Christmas stories. In 1849 he began public readings of the story, which proved so successful he undertook 127 further performances until 1870, the year of his death. A Christmas Carol has never been out of print and has been translated into several languages; the story has been adapted many times for film, stage, opera and other media.

A Christmas Carol captured the zeitgeist of the early Victorian revival of the Christmas holiday. Dickens acknowledged the influence of the modern Western observance of Christmas and later inspired several aspects of Christmas, including family gatherings, seasonal food and drink, dancing, games and a festive generosity of spirit.

== Plot ==
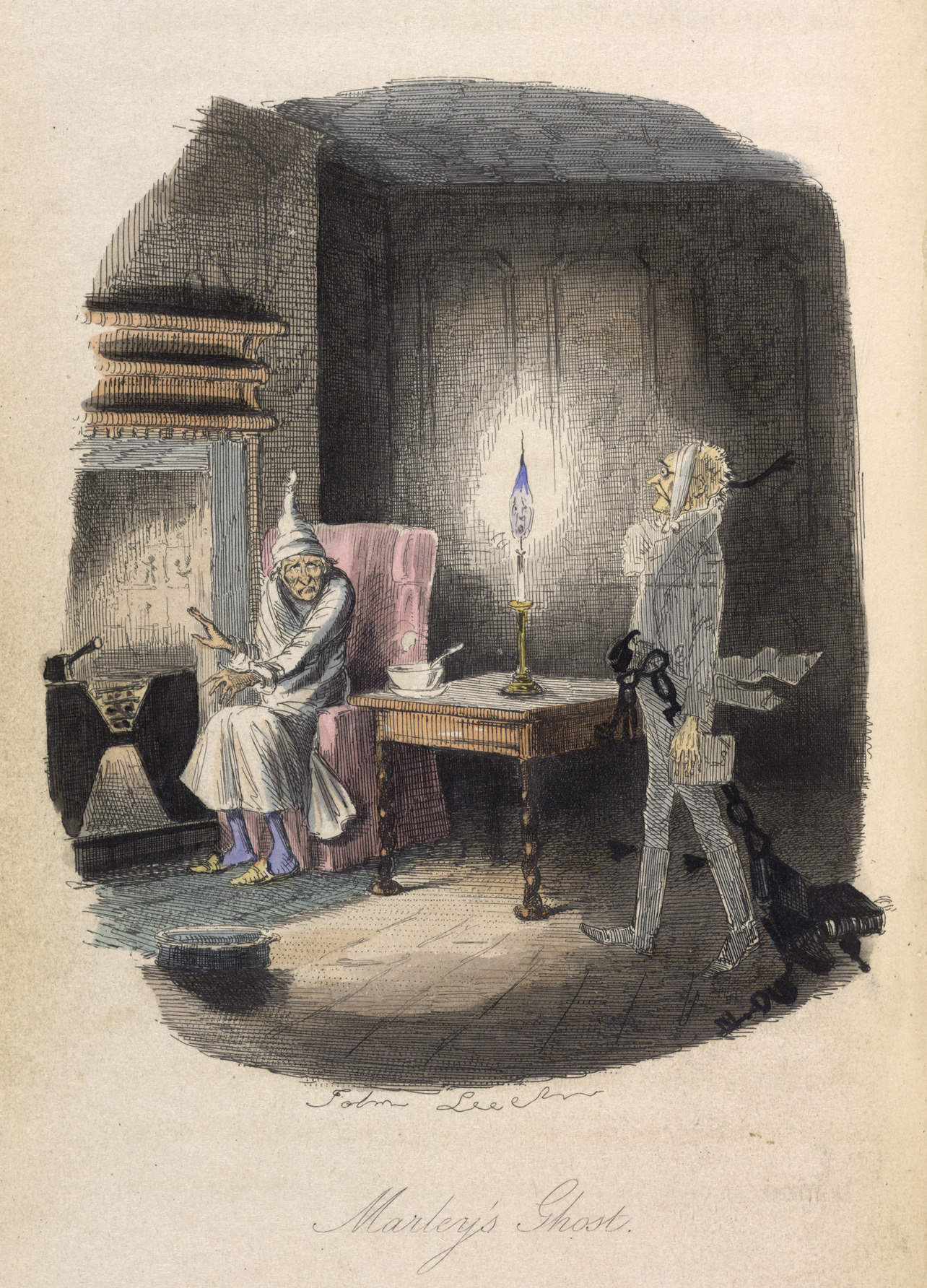
"Marley's Ghost", original illustration by John Leech from the 1843 edition

A Christmas Carol is divided into five chapters, which Dickens titled "staves".

=== Stave one ===
A Christmas Carol opens on a bleak, cold Christmas Eve in London, seven years after the death of Ebenezer Scrooge's business partner, Jacob Marley. Scrooge, an ageing miser, dislikes Christmas and refuses a dinner invitation from his nephew Fred. He turns away two men seeking a donation to provide food and heating for the poor and only grudgingly allows his overworked, underpaid clerk, Bob Cratchit, Christmas Day off with pay to conform to the social custom.

That night Scrooge is visited at home by Marley's ghost, who wanders the Earth entwined by heavy chains and money boxes forged during a lifetime of greed and selfishness. Marley tells Scrooge that he has a single chance to avoid the same fate: he will be visited by three spirits and must listen or be cursed to carry much heavier chains of his own.

=== Stave two ===
The first spirit, the Ghost of Christmas Past, takes Scrooge to Christmas scenes of Scrooge's boyhood, reminding him of a time when he was more innocent. The scenes reveal Scrooge's lonely childhood at boarding school; his relationship with his beloved sister Fan, the long-dead mother of Fred; and a Christmas party hosted by his first employer, Mr Fezziwig, who treated him like a son. Scrooge's neglected fiancée Belle is shown ending their relationship, as she realises that he will never love her as much as he loves money. Finally, they visit a now-married Belle with her large, happy family on the Christmas Eve that Marley died. Scrooge, upset by hearing a description of the man that he has become, demands that the ghost remove him from the house.

=== Stave three ===
The second spirit, the Ghost of Christmas Present, takes Scrooge to a joyous market where people are buying the makings of Christmas dinner and to celebrations of Christmas in a miner's cottage and in a lighthouse. Scrooge and the ghost also visit Fred's Christmas party. A major part of this stave is taken up with Bob Cratchit's family feast and introduces his youngest son, Tiny Tim, a happy boy who is seriously ill. The spirit informs Scrooge that Tiny Tim will die unless the course of events changes. Before disappearing, the spirit shows Scrooge two hideous, emaciated children named Ignorance and Want. He tells Scrooge to beware the former above all and mocks Scrooge's concern for their welfare.

=== Stave four ===
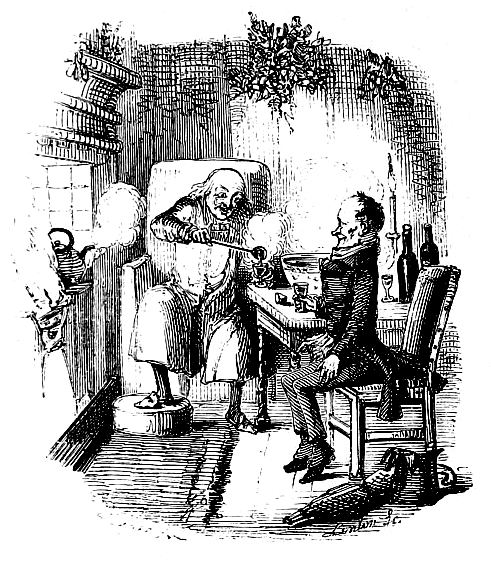
Scrooge and Bob Cratchit celebrate Christmas in an illustration from stave five of the original edition, 1843.

The third spirit, the Ghost of Christmas Yet to Come, shows Scrooge a Christmas Day in the future. The silent ghost reveals scenes involving the death of a disliked man whose funeral is attended by local businessmen only on condition that lunch is provided. His charwoman, laundress and the local undertaker steal his possessions to sell to a fence. When he asks the spirit to show a single person who feels emotion over his death, he is only given the pleasure of a poor couple who rejoice that his death gives them more time to put their finances in order. When Scrooge asks to see tenderness connected with any death, the ghost shows him Bob Cratchit and his family mourning the death of Tiny Tim. The ghost then allows Scrooge to see a neglected grave, with a tombstone bearing Scrooge's name. Sobbing, Scrooge pledges to change his ways.

=== Stave five ===
Scrooge awakens on Christmas morning a changed man. He makes a large donation to the charity he rejected the previous day, anonymously sends a large turkey to the Cratchit home for Christmas dinner and spends the afternoon at Fred's Christmas party. The following day he gives Cratchit an increase in pay, and begins to become a father figure to Tiny Tim. From then on Scrooge treats everyone with kindness, generosity and compassion, embodying the spirit of Christmas.

== Background ==
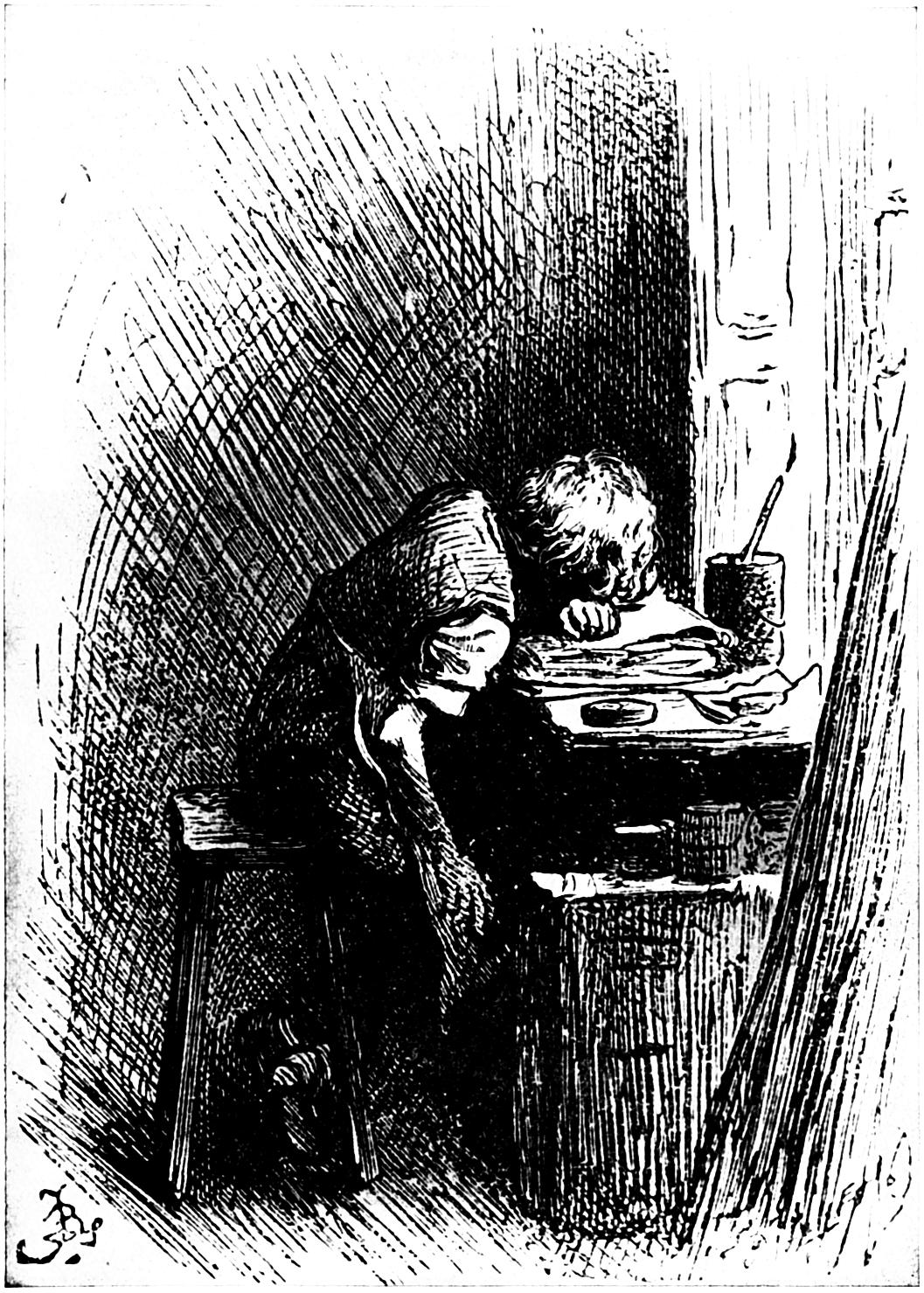
Dickens at the blacking warehouse, as envisioned by Fred Barnard

The writer Charles Dickens was born to a middle-class family which got into financial difficulties as a result of the spendthrift nature of his father John. In 1824 John was committed to the Marshalsea, a debtors' prison in Southwark, London. Dickens, aged 12, was forced to pawn his collection of books, leave school and work at a dirty and rat-infested shoe-blacking factory. The change in circumstances gave him what his biographer, Michael Slater, describes as a "deep personal and social outrage", which heavily influenced his writing and outlook.

By the end of 1842 Dickens was a well-established author with six major works (Note: These were Sketches by Boz (1836); The Pickwick Papers (1836); Nicholas Nickleby (1837); Oliver Twist (1838); The Old Curiosity Shop (1841); and Barnaby Rudge (1841).) as well as several short stories, novellas and other pieces. On 31 December that year he began publishing his novel Martin Chuzzlewit as a monthly serial; (Note: Serialisation was in 20 parts, which concluded on 30 June 1844.) it was his favourite work, but sales were disappointing and he faced temporary financial difficulties.

Celebrating the Christmas season had been growing in popularity through the Victorian era. The Christmas tree was introduced in Britain during the 18th century, and its use was popularised by Queen Victoria and Prince Albert. In the early 19th century there had been a revival of interest in Christmas carols, following a decline in popularity over the previous hundred years. The publication of Davies Gilbert's 1823 work Some Ancient Christmas Carols, With the Tunes to Which They Were Formerly Sung in the West of England and William Sandys's 1833 collection Christmas Carols, Ancient and Modern led to a growth in the form's popularity in Britain.

Dickens had an interest in Christmas, and his first story on the subject was "Christmas Festivities", published in Bell's Weekly Messenger in 1835; the story was then published as "A Christmas Dinner" in Sketches by Boz (1836). "The Story of the Goblins Who Stole a Sexton", another Christmas story, appeared in the 1836 novel The Pickwick Papers. In the episode, a Mr Wardle describes a misanthropic sexton, Gabriel Grub, who undergoes a Christmas conversion after being visited by goblins who show him the past and future. Slater considers that "the main elements of the Carol are present in the story", but not yet in a firm form. The story is followed by a passage about Christmas in Dickens's editorial Master Humphrey's Clock. The professor of English literature Paul Davis writes that although the "Goblins" story appears to be a prototype of A Christmas Carol, all Dickens's earlier writings about Christmas influenced the story.

=== Literary influences ===
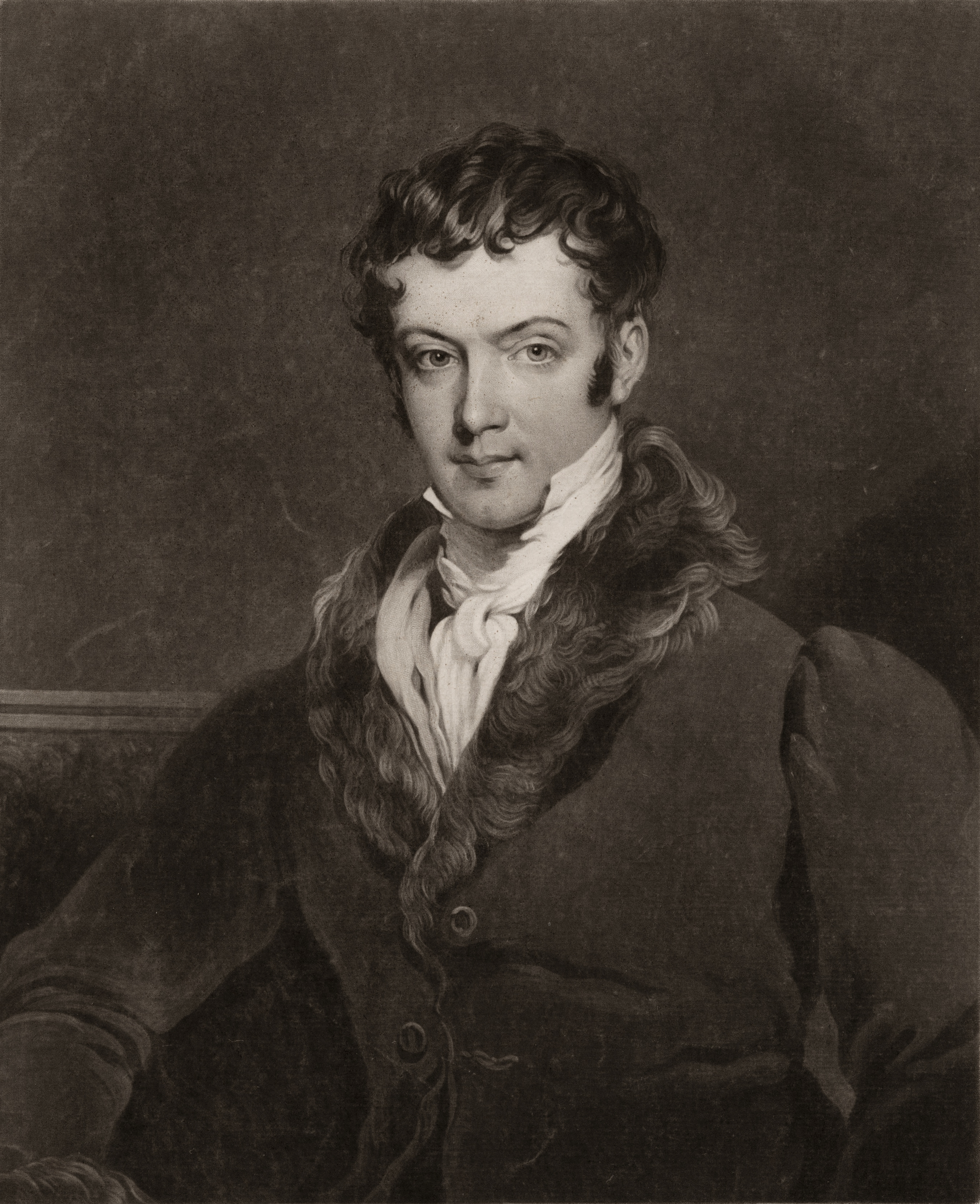
Washington Irving in 1820

Dickens was not the first author to celebrate the Christmas season in literature. Among earlier authors who influenced Dickens was Washington Irving, whose 1819–20 work The Sketch Book of Geoffrey Crayon, Gent. included four essays on old English Christmas traditions that he experienced while staying at Aston Hall near Birmingham. The tales and essays attracted Dickens, and the two authors shared the belief that returning to Christmas traditions might promote a type of social connection that they felt had been lost in the modern world.

Several works had an influence on the writing of A Christmas Carol, including two essays by his friend Douglas Jerrold: one from an 1841 issue of Punch, "How Mr. Chokepear Keeps a Merry Christmas" and one from 1843, "The Beauties of the Police". More broadly, Dickens was influenced by fairy tales and nursery stories, which he closely associated with Christmas, because he saw them as stories of conversion and transformation.

=== Social influences ===
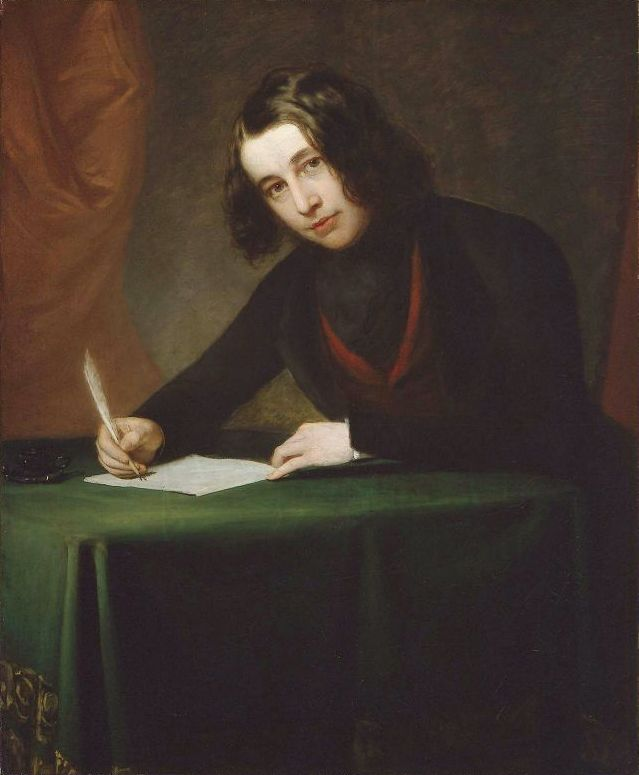
Charles Dickens in 1842, the year before the publication of A Christmas Carol

Dickens was touched by the lot of poor children in the middle decades of the 19th century. In early 1843 he toured the Cornish tin mines, where he was angered by seeing children working in appalling conditions. The suffering he witnessed there was reinforced by a visit to the Field Lane Ragged School, one of several London schools set up for the education of the capital's half-starved, illiterate street children.

In February 1843 the Second Report of the Children's Employment Commission was published. It was a parliamentary report exposing the effects of the Industrial Revolution upon working class children. Horrified by what he read, Dickens planned to publish an inexpensive political pamphlet tentatively titled, An Appeal to the People of England, on behalf of the Poor Man's Child, but changed his mind, deferring the pamphlet's production until the end of the year. In March he wrote to Dr Southwood Smith, one of the four commissioners responsible for the Second Report, about his change in plans: "you will certainly feel that a Sledge hammer has come down with twenty times the force—twenty thousand times the force—I could exert by following out my first idea".

In a fundraising speech on 5 October 1843 at the Manchester Athenaeum, Dickens urged workers and employers to join together to combat ignorance with educational reform, and realised in the days following that the most effective way to reach the broadest segment of the population with his social concerns about poverty and injustice was to write a deeply felt Christmas narrative rather than polemical pamphlets and essays.

=== Writing history ===
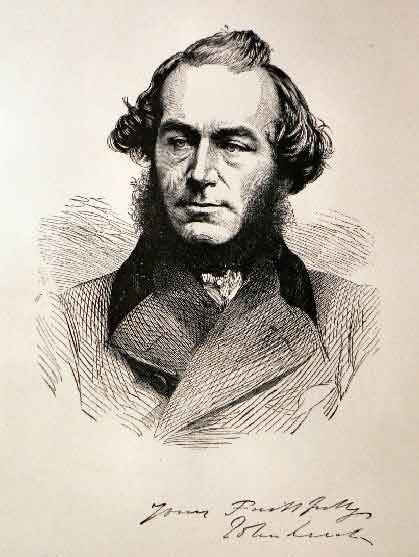
John Leech, illustrator of the first edition

By mid-1843 Dickens was suffering from financial problems. Sales of Martin Chuzzlewit were falling off, and his wife, Catherine, was pregnant with their fifth child. Matters worsened when Chapman & Hall, his publishers, threatened to reduce his monthly income by £50 if sales dropped further. He began A Christmas Carol in October 1843. Michael Slater, Dickens's biographer, describes the book as being "written at white heat"; it was completed in six weeks, the final pages being written in early December. He built much of the work in his head while taking night-time walks of 15 to 20 miles (24 to 32 km) around London. Dickens's sister-in-law wrote how he "wept, and laughed, and wept again, and excited himself in a most extraordinary manner, in composition". Slater says that A Christmas Carol was

intended to open its readers' hearts towards those struggling to survive on the lower rungs of the economic ladder and to encourage practical benevolence, but also to warn of the terrible danger to society created by the toleration of widespread ignorance and actual want among the poor.

George Cruikshank, the illustrator who had earlier worked with Dickens on Sketches by Boz (1836) and Oliver Twist (1838), introduced him to the caricaturist John Leech. By 24 October Dickens invited Leech to work on A Christmas Carol, and four hand-coloured etchings and four black-and-white wood engravings by the artist accompanied the text. Dickens's hand-written manuscript of the story does not include the sentence in the penultimate paragraph "... and to Tiny Tim, who did not die"; this was added later, during the printing process. (Note: The addition of the line has proved contentious to some. One writer in The Dickensian—the journal of the Dickens Fellowship—wrote in 1933 that "the fate of Tiny Tim should be a matter of dignified reticence ... Dickens was carried away by exuberance, and momentarily forgot good taste".)

== Characters ==
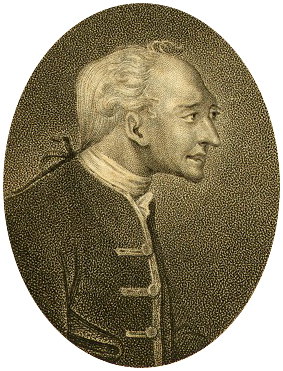
John Elwes, also called John the Miser; one of the models for Scrooge

The central character of A Christmas Carol is Ebenezer Scrooge, a miserly London-based businessman, described in the story as "a squeezing, wrenching, grasping, scraping, clutching, covetous old sinner!" Kelly writes that Scrooge may have been influenced by Dickens's conflicting feelings for his father, whom he both loved and demonised. This psychological conflict may be responsible for the two radically different Scrooges in the tale—one a cold, stingy and greedy semi-recluse, the other a benevolent, sociable man. The professor of English literature Robert Douglas-Fairhurst considers that in the opening part of the book covering young Scrooge's lonely and unhappy childhood, and his aspiration for money to avoid poverty "is something of a self-parody of Dickens's fears about himself"; the post-transformation parts of the book are how Dickens optimistically sees himself.

Scrooge could also be based on two misers: the eccentric John Elwes, MP, or Jemmy Wood, the owner of the Gloucester Old Bank and also known as "The Gloucester Miser". According to the sociologist Frank W. Elwell, Scrooge's views on the poor are a reflection of those of the demographer and political economist Thomas Malthus, while the miser's questions "Are there no prisons? ... And the Union workhouses? ... The treadmill and the Poor Law are in full vigour, then?" are a reflection of a sarcastic question raised by the philosopher Thomas Carlyle, "Are there not treadmills, gibbets; even hospitals, poor-rates, New Poor-Law?" (Note: Carlyle's original question was written in his 1840 work Chartism.)

There are literary precursors for Scrooge in Dickens's own works. Peter Ackroyd, Dickens's biographer, sees similarities between the character and the elder Martin Chuzzlewit character, although the miser is "a more fantastic image" than the Chuzzlewit patriarch; Ackroyd observes that Chuzzlewit's transformation to a charitable figure is a parallel to that of the miser. Douglas-Fairhurst sees that the minor character Gabriel Grub from The Pickwick Papers was also an influence when creating Scrooge. (Note: Grub's name came from a 19th-century Dutch miser, Gabriel de Graaf, a morose gravedigger.) It is possible that Scrooge's name came from a tombstone Dickens had seen on a visit to Edinburgh. The grave was for Ebenezer Lennox Scroggie, whose job was given as a meal man—a corn merchant; Dickens misread the inscription as "mean man". (Note: Scroggie was unlike Scrooge in nature, and was described as "a well-known hedonist who loved wine, women, and parties ... a dandy and terrible philanderer who had several sexual liaisons which made him the talk of the town ... a jovial and kindly man".) This theory has been described as "a probable Dickens hoax" for which "[n]o one could find any corroborating evidence".

When Dickens was young he lived near a tradesman's premises with the sign "Goodge and Marney", which may have provided the name for Scrooge's former business partner. For the chained Marley, Dickens drew on his memory of a visit to the Western Penitentiary in Pittsburgh, Pennsylvania, in March 1842, where he saw—and was affected by seeing—fettered prisoners. For the character Tiny Tim, Dickens used his nephew Henry, a disabled boy who was five at the time A Christmas Carol was written. (Note: Henry was also used as the basis for Paul Dombey Jr in Dombey and Son.) The two figures of Want and Ignorance, sheltering in the robes of the Ghost of Christmas Present, were inspired by the children Dickens had seen on his visit to a ragged school in the East End of London.

== Themes ==
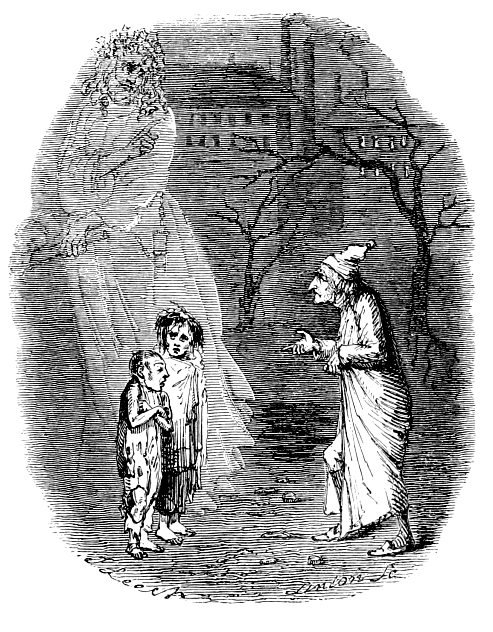
Ignorance and Want from the original edition, 1843

The transformation of Scrooge is central to the story. Davis considers Scrooge to be "a protean figure always in process of reformation"; Kelly writes that the transformation is reflected in the description of Scrooge, who begins as a two-dimensional character, but who then grows into one who "possess[es] an emotional depth [and] a regret for lost opportunities". Some writers, including the Dickens scholar Grace Moore, consider that there is a Christian theme running through A Christmas Carol, and that the novella should be seen as an allegory of the Christian concept of redemption. (Note: Others who have examined the Christian theme include Geoffrey Rowell, Claire Tomalin and Martin Sable.) Dickens's biographer Claire Tomalin sees the conversion of Scrooge as carrying the Christian message that "even the worst of sinners may repent and become a good man". Dickens's attitudes towards organised religion were complex; (Note: The author G. K. Chesterton wrote of Dickens's religious views that "the tone of Dickens towards religion, though like that of most of his contemporaries, philosophically disturbed and rather historically ignorant, had an element that was very characteristic of himself. He had all the prejudices of his time. He had, for instance, that dislike of defined dogmas, which really means a preference for unexamined dogmas." Dickens stated that "I have always striven in my writings to express the veneration for the life and lessons of our Saviour.") he based his beliefs and principles on the New Testament. His statement that Marley "had no bowels" is a reference to the "bowels of compassion" mentioned in the First Epistle of John, the reason for his eternal damnation. (Note: The full verse of I John 3:17 is "But whoso hath this world's good, and seeth his brother have need, and shutteth up his bowels of compassion from him, how dwelleth the love of God in him?")

Other writers, including Kelly, consider that Dickens put forward a "secular vision of this sacred holiday". The Dickens scholar John O. Jordan argues that A Christmas Carol shows what Dickens referred to in a letter to his friend John Forster as his "Carol philosophy, cheerful views, sharp anatomisation of humbug, jolly good temper ... and a vein of glowing, hearty, generous, mirthful, beaming reference in everything to Home and Fireside". From a secular viewpoint, the cultural historian Penne Restad suggests that Scrooge's redemption underscores "the conservative, individualistic and patriarchal aspects" of Dickens's "Carol philosophy" of charity and altruism.

Dickens wrote A Christmas Carol in response to British social attitudes towards poverty, particularly child poverty, and wished to use the novella as a means to put forward his arguments against it. The story shows Scrooge as a paradigm for self-interest, and the possible repercussions of ignoring the poor, especially children—personified by the allegorical figures of Want and Ignorance. The two figures were created to arouse sympathy with readers—as was Tiny Tim. Douglas-Fairhurst observes that the use of such figures allowed Dickens to present his message of the need for charity without alienating his largely middle-class readership.

== Publication ==
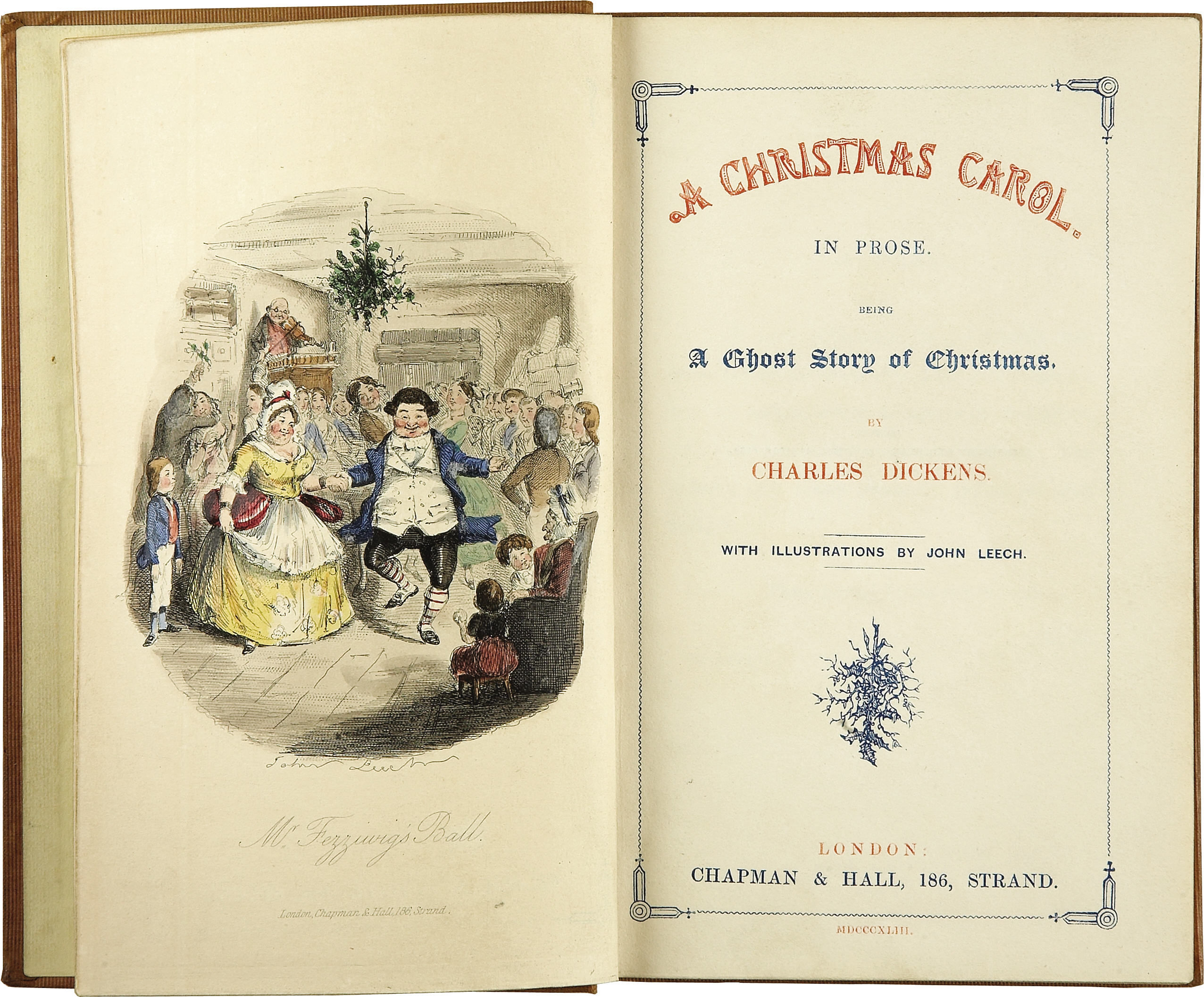
First edition frontispiece and title page (1843)

As the result of the disagreements with Chapman and Hall over the commercial failures of Martin Chuzzlewit, Dickens arranged to pay for the publishing himself, in exchange for a percentage of the profits. Production of A Christmas Carol was not without problems. The first printing was meant to have festive green endpapers, but they came out a dull olive colour. Dickens's publisher Chapman and Hall replaced these with yellow endpapers and reworked the title page in harmonising red and blue shades. The final product was bound in red cloth with gilt-edged pages, completed only two days before the publication date of 19 December 1843. Following publication, Dickens arranged for the manuscript to be bound in red Morocco leather and presented as a gift to his solicitor, Thomas Mitton. (Note: In 1875 Mitton sold the manuscript to the bookseller Francis Harvey – reportedly for £50 (equivalent to £5,000 in 2025) – who sold it to the autograph collector, Henry George Churchill, in 1882; in turn Churchill sold the manuscript to Bennett, a Birmingham bookseller. Bennett sold it for £200 to Robson and Kerslake of London, which sold it to Dickens collector Stuart M. Samuel for £300. It was purchased by J. Pierpont Morgan for an undisclosed sum and is now held by the Morgan Library & Museum, New York.)

Priced at five shillings (equivalent to £27 in 2025), the first run of 6,000 copies sold out by Christmas Eve. Chapman and Hall issued second and third editions before the new year, and the book continued to sell well into 1844. By the end of 1844 eleven more editions had been released. Since its initial publication the book has been issued in numerous hardback and paperback editions, translated into several languages and has never been out of print. It was Dickens's most popular book in the United States, and sold over two million copies in the hundred years following its first publication there.

The high production costs upon which Dickens insisted led to reduced profits, and the first edition brought him only £230 (equivalent to £25,000 in 2025) rather than the £1,000 (equivalent to £110,000 in 2025) he expected. A year later, the profits were only £744, and Dickens was deeply disappointed. (Note: Dickens's biographer, Claire Tomalin, puts the first edition profits at £137, and those by the end of 1844 at £726.)

== Reception ==
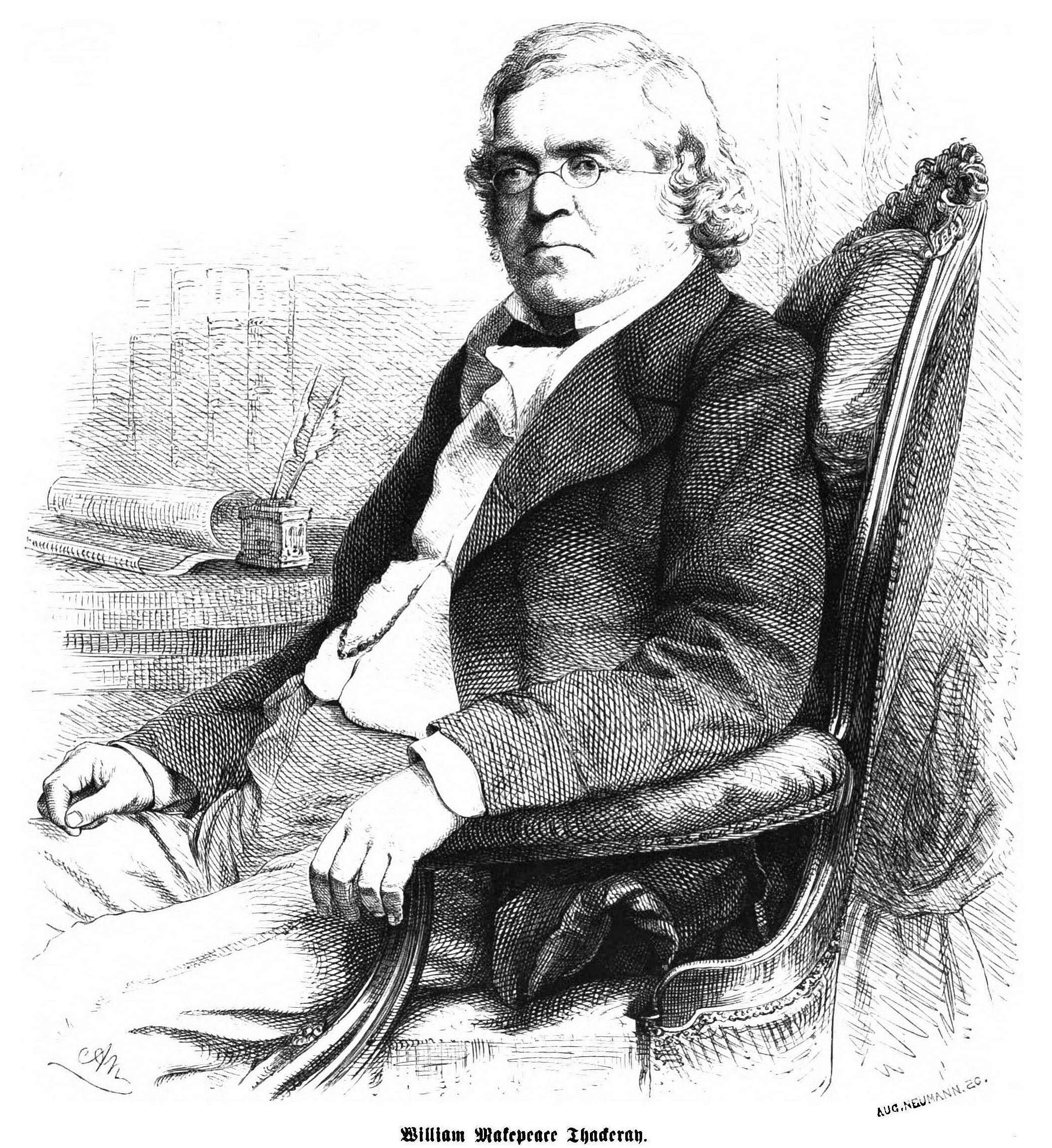
Thackeray in 1864. He wrote that A Christmas Carol was "a national benefit and to every man or woman who reads it, a personal kindness".

According to Douglas-Fairhurst, contemporary reviews of A Christmas Carol "were almost uniformly kind". The Illustrated London News described how the story's "impressive eloquence ... its unfeigned lightness of heart—its playful and sparkling humour ... its gentle spirit of humanity" all put the reader "in good humour with ourselves, with each other, with the season and with the author". The critic from The Athenaeum, the literary magazine, considered it a "tale to make the reader laugh and cry – to open his hands, and open his heart to charity even toward the uncharitable ... a dainty dish to set before a King." William Makepeace Thackeray, writing in Fraser's Magazine, described the book as "a national benefit and to every man or woman who reads it, a personal kindness. The last two people I heard speak of it were women; neither knew the other, or the author, and both said, by way of criticism, 'God bless him!'"

The poet Thomas Hood, in his own journal, wrote that "If Christmas, with its ancient and hospitable customs, its social and charitable observances, were ever in danger of decay, this is the book that would give them a new lease." The reviewer for Tait's Edinburgh Magazine—Theodore Martin, who was usually critical of Dickens's work—spoke well of A Christmas Carol, noting it was "a noble book, finely felt and calculated to work much social good". After Dickens's death, Margaret Oliphant deplored the turkey and plum pudding aspects of the book but admitted that in the days of its first publication it was regarded as "a new gospel", and noted that the book was unique in that it made people behave better. The religious press generally ignored the tale but, in January 1844, Christian Remembrancer thought the tale's old and hackneyed subject was treated in an original way and praised the author's sense of humour and pathos. The writer and social thinker John Ruskin told a friend that he thought Dickens had taken the religion from Christmas, and had imagined it as "mistletoe and pudding—neither resurrection from the dead, nor rising of new stars, nor teaching of wise men, nor shepherds".

There were critics of the book. The New Monthly Magazine praised the story, but thought the book's physical excesses—the gilt edges and expensive binding—kept the price high, making it unavailable to the poor. The review recommended that the tale should be printed on cheap paper and priced accordingly. An unnamed writer for The Westminster Review mocked Dickens's grasp of economics, asking "Who went without turkey and punch in order that Bob Cratchit might get them—for, unless there were turkeys and punch in surplus, someone must go without".

Dickens had criticised the US in American Notes and Martin Chuzzlewit, making American readers reluctant to embrace his work, but by the end of the American Civil War, the book had gained wide recognition in American households. In 1863 The New York Times published an enthusiastic review, noting that the author brought the "old Christmas ... of bygone centuries and remote manor houses, into the living rooms of the poor of today".

== Aftermath ==
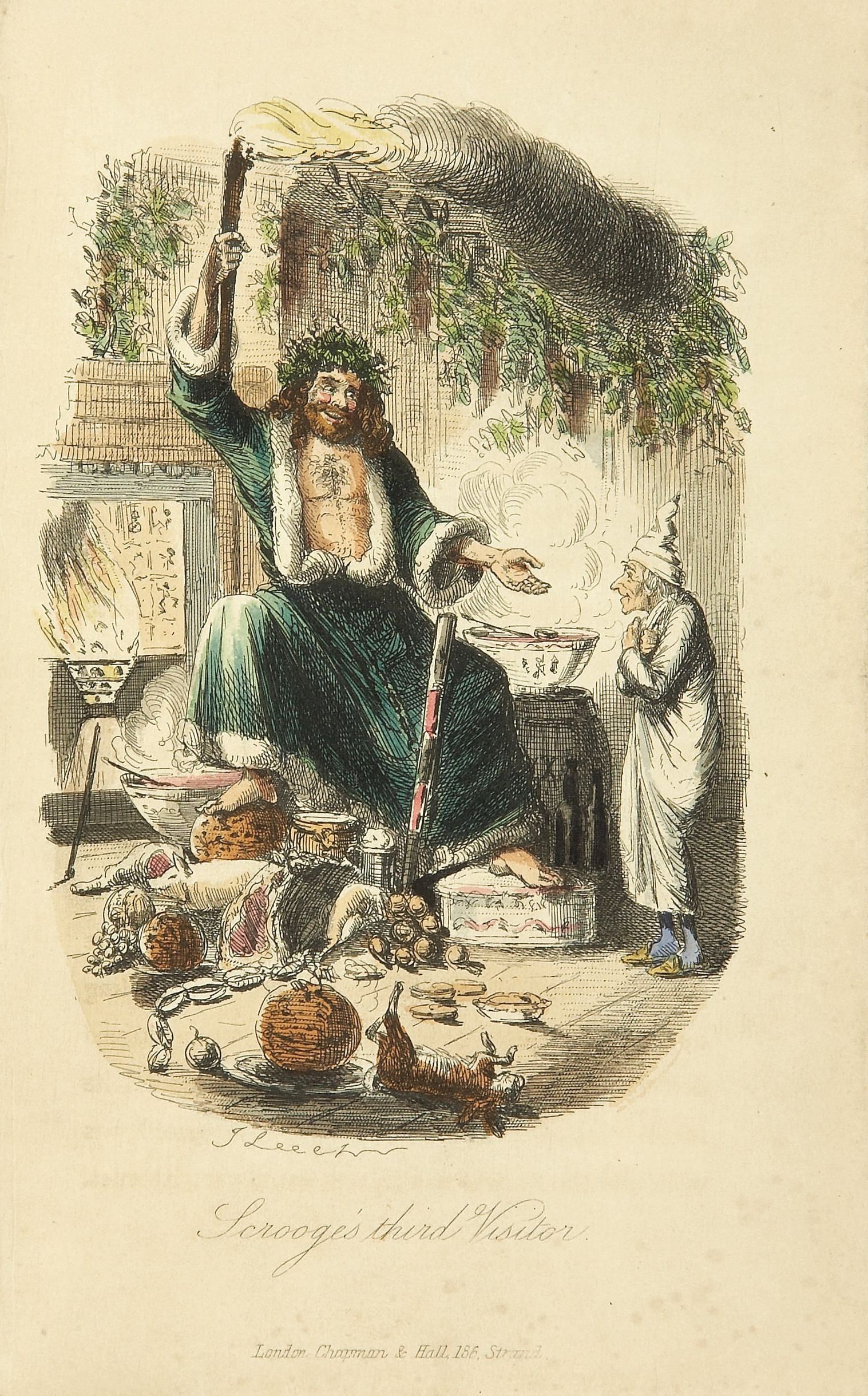
"The Ghost of Christmas Present" from the original edition, 1843

In January 1844 Parley's Illuminated Library published an unauthorised version of the story in a condensed form which they sold for twopence. (Note: The Parley version was titled A Christmas Ghost Story reoriginated from the original by Charles Dickens Esquire and analytically condensed for this work.) Dickens wrote to his solicitor

I have not the least doubt that if these Vagabonds can be stopped they must. ... Let us be the sledge-hammer in this, or I shall be beset by hundreds of the same crew when I come out with a long story.

Two days after the release of the Parley version, Dickens sued on the basis of copyright infringement and won. The publishers declared themselves bankrupt and Dickens was left to pay £700 in costs. The small profits Dickens earned from A Christmas Carol further strained his relationship with his publishers, and he broke with them in favour of Bradbury and Evans, who had been printing his works to that point.

Dickens returned to the tale several times during his life to amend the phrasing and punctuation. He capitalised on the success of the book by publishing other Christmas stories: The Chimes (1844), The Cricket on the Hearth (1845), The Battle of Life (1846) and The Haunted Man and the Ghost's Bargain (1848); these were secular conversion tales which acknowledged the progressive societal changes of the previous year, and highlighted those social problems which still needed to be addressed. While the public eagerly bought the later books, the reviewers were highly critical of the stories.

== Performances and adaptations ==
By 1849 Dickens was engaged with David Copperfield and had neither the time nor the inclination to produce another Christmas book. He decided the best way to reach his audience with his "Carol philosophy" was by public readings. During Christmas 1853 he gave a reading in Birmingham Town Hall to the Industrial and Literary Institute. He insisted that tickets be reserved for working-class attendees at quarter-price and the performance was a great success. Initially he donated the profits to good causes, although from 1858 he read the book for profit. He read the tale in an abbreviated version 127 times, until 1870 (the year of his death), including at his farewell performance. Each of his readings took three hours.

First film adaptation, Scrooge, or, Marley's Ghost, 1901

In the years following the book's publication, responses to the tale were published by W. M. Swepstone (Christmas Shadows, 1850), Horatio Alger (Job Warner's Christmas, 1863), Louisa May Alcott (A Christmas Dream, and How It Came True, 1882), and others who followed Scrooge's life as a reformed man – or some who thought Dickens had got it wrong and needed to be corrected.

The novella was adapted for the stage almost immediately. Three productions opened on 5 February 1844, one by Edward Stirling, A Christmas Carol; or, Past, Present, and Future, being sanctioned by Dickens and running for more than 40 nights. By the close of February 1844 eight rival A Christmas Carol theatrical productions were playing in London. The story has been adapted for film and television more than any of Dickens's other works. In 1901 it was produced as Scrooge, or, Marley's Ghost, a silent black-and-white British film; it was one of the first known adaptations of a Dickens work on film, but it is now largely lost. The story was adapted in 1923 for BBC radio. It has been adapted to other media, including opera, ballet, animation, stage musicals and a BBC mime production starring Marcel Marceau.

Davis considers the adaptations have become better remembered than the original. Some of Dickens's scenes—such as visiting the miners and lighthouse keepers—have been forgotten by many, while other events often added—such as Scrooge visiting the Cratchits on Christmas Day—are now thought by many to be part of the original story. Accordingly, Davis distinguishes between the original text and the "remembered version".

== Legacy ==
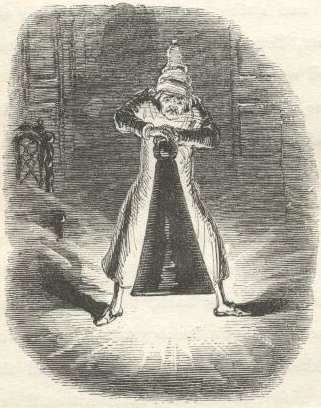
Scrooge extinguishing the first spirit

The phrase "Merry Christmas" had been around for many years—the earliest known written use was in a letter in 1534—but Dickens's use of the phrase in A Christmas Carol popularised it among the Victorian public. The exclamation "Bah! Humbug!" entered popular use in the English language as a retort to anything sentimental or overly festive; the name "Scrooge" became used as a designation for a miser and was added to the Oxford English Dictionary as such in 1982.

In the early 19th century the celebration of Christmas was associated in Britain with the countryside and peasant revels, disconnected to the increasing urbanisation and industrialisation taking place. Davis considers that in A Christmas Carol, Dickens showed that Christmas could be celebrated in towns and cities, despite increasing modernisation. The modern observance of Christmas in English-speaking countries is largely the result of a Victorian-era revival of the holiday. The Oxford Movement of the 1830s and 1840s had produced a resurgence of the traditional rituals and religious observances associated with Christmastide and, with A Christmas Carol, Dickens captured the zeitgeist while he reflected and reinforced his vision of Christmas.

Dickens advocated a humanitarian focus of the holiday, which influenced several aspects of Christmas that are still celebrated in Western culture, such as family gatherings, seasonal food and drink, dancing, games and a festive generosity of spirit. (Note: One example of this was the introduction of turkey as the main meat of the Christmas meal. In Britain the tradition had been to eat roast goose, but a change to turkey followed the publication of the book. By 1868 Mrs Beeton, in her Book of Household Management, advised her readers that "A Christmas dinner, with the middle-class of this empire, would scarcely be a Christmas dinner without its turkey.") The historian Ronald Hutton writes that Dickens "linked worship and feasting, within a context of social reconciliation".

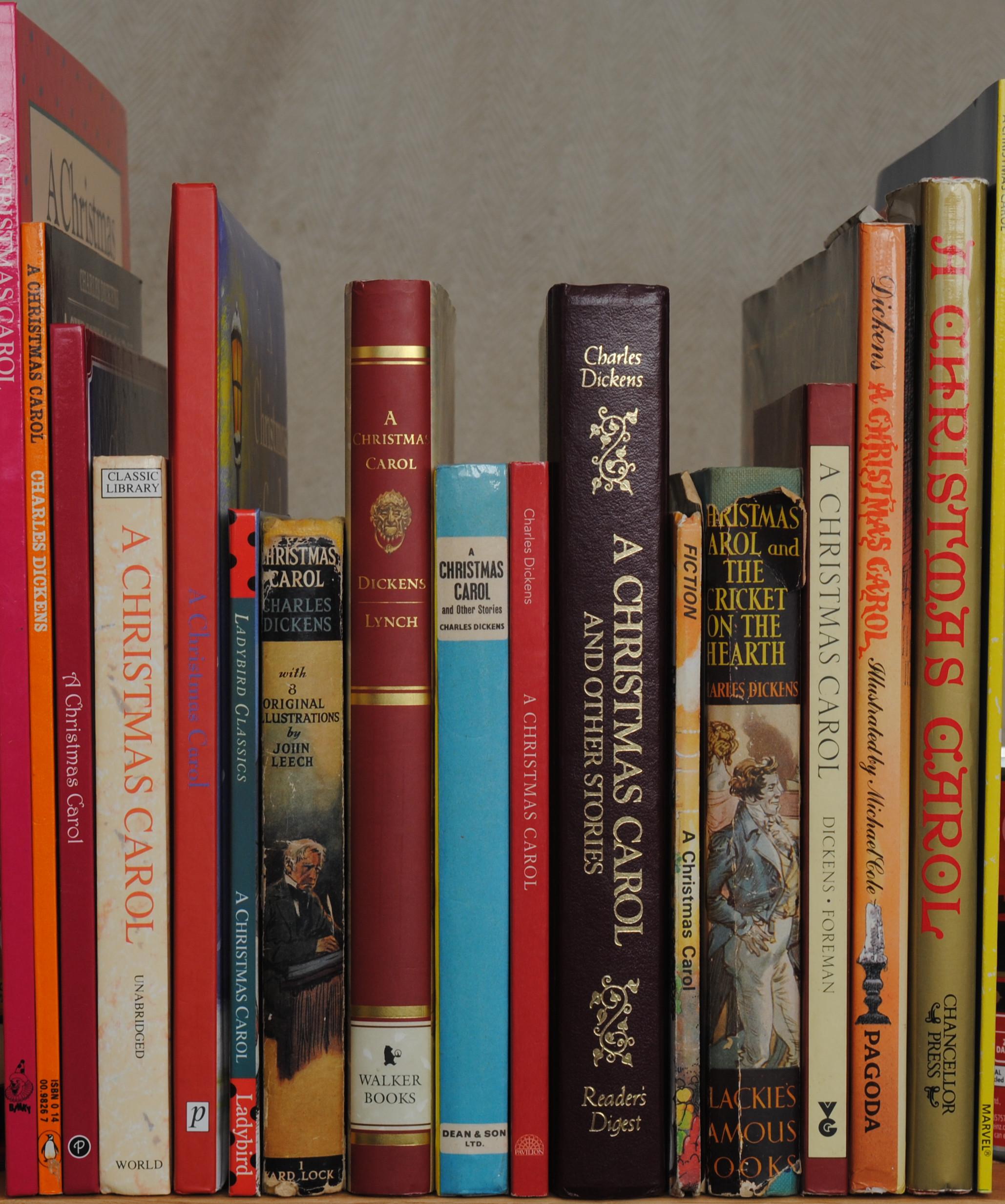
A few of the many editions of A Christmas Carol

The novelist William Dean Howells, analysing several of Dickens's Christmas stories, including A Christmas Carol, considered that by 1891 the "pathos appears false and strained; the humor largely horseplay; the characters theatrical; the joviality pumped; the psychology commonplace; the sociology alone funny". The writer James Joyce considered that Dickens took a childish approach with A Christmas Carol, producing a gap between the naïve optimism of the story and the realities of life at the time.

Ruth Glancy, the professor of English literature, states that the largest impact of A Christmas Carol was the influence felt by individual readers. In early 1844 The Gentleman's Magazine attributed a rise of charitable giving in Britain to Dickens's novella; in 1874, Robert Louis Stevenson, after reading Dickens's Christmas books, vowed to give generously to those in need, and Thomas Carlyle expressed a generous hospitality by hosting two Christmas dinners after reading the book. In 1867 one American businessman was so moved by attending a reading that he closed his factory on Christmas Day and sent every employee a turkey, while in the early years of the 20th century Maud of Wales—the Queen of Norway—sent gifts to London's crippled children signed "With Tiny Tim's Love". On the novella, the author G. K. Chesterton wrote "The beauty and blessing of the story ... lie in the great furnace of real happiness that glows through Scrooge and everything around him. ... Whether the Christmas visions would or would not convert Scrooge, they convert us."

Analysing the changes made to adaptations over time, Davis sees changes to the focus of the story and its characters to reflect mainstream thinking of the period. While Dickens's Victorian audiences would have viewed the tale as a spiritual but secular parable, in the early 20th century it became a children's story, read by parents who remembered their parents reading it when they were younger. In the lead-up to and during the Great Depression, Davis suggests that while some saw the story as a "denunciation of capitalism, ...most read it as a way to escape oppressive economic realities". The film versions of the 1930s were different in the UK and US. British-made films showed a traditional telling of the story, while US-made works showed Cratchit in a more central role, escaping the depression caused by European bankers and celebrating what Davis calls "the Christmas of the common man". In the 1960s, Scrooge was sometimes portrayed as a Freudian figure wrestling with his past. By the 1980s he was again set in a world of depression and economic uncertainty.

== See also ==
- Christmas horror
- Dickens Christmas fair
- List of Christmas-themed literature
- The Man Who Invented Christmas

== Sources ==
=== Books ===
- Ackroyd, Peter (1990). Dickens. London: Sinclair-Stevenson. ISBN 978-1-85619-000-8.
- Billen, Andrew (2005). Charles Dickens: The Man Who Invented Christmas. London: Short Books. ISBN 978-1-904977-18-6.
- Callow, Simon (2009). Dickens' Christmas: A Victorian Celebration. London: Frances Lincoln. ISBN 978-0-7112-3031-6.
- Carlyle, Thomas (1840). Chartism. London: J. Fraser. OCLC 247585901.
- Chesterton, G. K. (1989). The Collected Works of G.K. Chesterton: Chesterton on Dickens. San Francisco, CA: Ignatius Press. ISBN 978-0-89870-258-3.
- Cochrane, Robertson (1996). Wordplay: origins, meanings, and usage of the English language. Toronto: University of Toronto Press. ISBN 978-0-8020-7752-3.
- Davis, Paul (1990a). The Lives and Times of Ebenezer Scrooge. New Haven, CT: Yale University Press. ISBN 978-0-300-04664-9.
- Deacy, Christopher (2016). Christmas as Religion: Rethinking Santa, the Secular, and the Sacred. Oxford: Oxford University Press. ISBN 978-0-19-106955-0.
- DeVito, Carlo (2014). Inventing Scrooge (Kindle ed.). Kennebunkport, ME: Cider Mill Press. ISBN 978-1-60433-555-2.
- Dickens, Charles (1843). A Christmas Carol. London: Chapman and Hall. OCLC 181675592.
- Diedrick, James (1987). "Charles Dickens". In Thesing, William (ed.). Dictionary of Literary Biography: Victorian Prose Writers before 1867. Farmington Hills, MI: Gale. ISBN 978-0-8103-1733-8.
- Douglas-Fairhurst, Robert (2006). "Introduction". In Dickens, Charles (ed.). A Christmas Carol and other Christmas Books. Oxford: Oxford University Press. pp. vii–xxix. ISBN 978-0-19-920474-8.
- Forbes, Bruce David (2008). Christmas: A Candid History. Oakland, CA: University of California Press. p. 62. ISBN 978-0-520-25802-0.
- Garry, Jane; El Shamy, Hasan (2005). Archetypes and Motifs in Folklore and Literature. Armonk, NY: M.E. Sharpe. ISBN 978-0-7656-2953-1.
- Glancy, Ruth F. (1985). Dickens' Christmas Books, Christmas Stories, and Other Short Fiction. Michigan: Garland. ISBN 978-0-8240-8988-7.
- Hammond, R. A. (1871). The Life and Writings of Charles Dickens: A Memorial Volume. Toronto: Maclear & Company.
- Harrison, Mary-Catherine (2008). Sentimental Realism: Poverty and the Ethics of Empathy, 1832–1867 (PhD). Ann Arbor, MI: The University of Michigan. ISBN 978-0-549-51095-6. OCLC 1194748531. ProQuest 304571571.
- Howells, William Dean (1910). My literary passions, criticism and fiction. New York and London: Harper & Brother. p. 2986994. ISBN 978-1-77667-633-0.
- Hutton, Ronald (1996). Stations of the Sun: The Ritual Year in England. Oxford: Oxford University Press. ISBN 978-0-19-285448-3.
- Jordan, Christine (2015). Secret Gloucester. Stroud, Glos: Amberley Publishing. ISBN 978-1-4456-4689-3.
- Jordan, John O. (2001). The Cambridge Companion to Charles Dickens. Cambridge: Cambridge University Press. ISBN 978-0-521-66964-1.
- Kelly, Richard Michael (2003). "Introduction". In Dickens, Charles (ed.). A Christmas Carol. Ontario: Broadway Press. pp. 9–30. ISBN 978-1-55111-476-7.
- Ledger, Sally (2007). Dickens and the Popular Radical Imagination. Cambridge: Cambridge University Press. ISBN 978-0-521-84577-9.
- Moore, Grace (2011). Charles Dickens' A Christmas Carol. St Kilda, VIC: Insight Publications. ISBN 978-1-921411-91-5.
- Pykett, Lyn (2017). Charles Dickens. Bloomsbury Publishing. ISBN 978-1-4039-1919-9.
- Restad, Penne L. (1996). Christmas in America: a History. Oxford: Oxford University Press. ISBN 978-0-19-510980-1.
- Sillence, Rebecca (2015). Gloucester History Tour. Stroud, Glos: Amberley Publishing. ISBN 978-1-4456-4859-0.
- Slater, Michael (2003). "Introduction". In Dickens, Charles (ed.). A Christmas Carol and other Christmas Writings. London: Penguin Books. pp. xi–xxviii. ISBN 978-0-14-043905-2.
- Slater, Michael (2009). Charles Dickens. New Haven, CT and London: Yale University Press. ISBN 978-0-300-16552-4.
- Standiford, Les (2008). The Man Who Invented Christmas: How Charles Dickens's A Christmas Carol Rescued His Career and Revived Our Holiday Spirits. New York: Crown. ISBN 978-0-307-40578-4.
- Studwell, William Emmett; Jones, Dorothy E. (1998). Publishing Glad Tidings: Essays on Christmas Music. Binghamton, NY: The Haworth Press. ISBN 978-0-7890-0398-0.
- Tomalin, Claire (2011). Charles Dickens: A Life. London: Penguin Books. ISBN 978-0-670-91767-9.
- Welch, Bob (2015). 52 Little Lessons from a Christmas Carol. Nashville, TN: Thomas Nelson. ISBN 978-1-4002-0675-9.

=== Online resources ===
- "A Christmas Carol". The Radio Times (12): 23. 14 December 1923. Archived from the original on 21 December 2016.
- "A Christmas Carol". WorldCat.
- Ansari, Samina (7 May 2020). "How the BMI gave Charles Dickens a new career". The Birmingham & Midland Institute. Archived from the original on 18 January 2024.
- Davidson, Ewan. "Scrooge, or, Marley's Ghost (1901)". Screenonline. British Film Institute. Archived from the original on 2 August 2016.
- Elwell, Frank W. (2 November 2001). "Reclaiming Malthus". Rogers State University. Archived from the original on 24 March 2017.
- Lalumia, Christine (12 December 2001). "Scrooge and Albert". History Today.
- Lee, Imogen. "Ragged Schools". British Library. Archived from the original on 15 July 2014.
- Martin, Katherine Connor (19 December 2011). "merry, adj". Oxford English Dictionary. Archived from the original on 6 July 2017.(subscription required)
- "Provenance". The Morgan Library & Museum. 20 November 2013.
- Rowell, Geoffrey (12 December 1993). "Dickens and the Construction of Christmas". History Today.
- "Scrooge, n". Oxford English Dictionary. (subscription required)
- Sutherland, John (15 May 2014). "The Origins of A Christmas Carol". British Library. Archived from the original on 30 November 2020.
- Varese, Jon Michael (22 December 2009). "Why A Christmas Carol was a flop for Dickens". The Guardian.
- "The Annual RPI and Average Earnings for Britain, 1209 to Present (New Series)". MeasuringWorth.
- "Dickens Visits Birmingham". Birmingham Conservation Trust. 19 December 2012.

=== Newspapers, journals and magazines ===
- "150-year-old 'Christmas Carol' written in 6 weeks by Dickens". Arlington Heights Daily Herald. 15 December 1993. p. 16.
- Alleyne, Richard (24 December 2007). "Real Scrooge 'was Dutch gravedigger'". The Daily Telegraph. Archived from the original on 10 January 2022.
- "Charles Dickens; Works of Charles Dickens. Household Edition". The New York Times. 19 December 1863.
- Chorley, H. F. (23 December 1843). "A Christmas Carol". The Athenaeum (843): 1127–1128.
- "Christmas Carol". The New Monthly Magazine. 70 (277): 148–149. January 1844.
- Davis, Paul (Winter 1990b). "Literary History: Retelling A Christmas Carol: Text and Culture-Text". The American Scholar. 59 (1): 109–15. JSTOR 41211762.
- Gordon, Alexander; McConnell, Anita (2008). "Elwes [formerly Meggott], John". Oxford Dictionary of National Biography (online ed.). Oxford University Press. doi:10.1093/ref:odnb/8776. (Subscription, Wikipedia Library access or UK public library membership required.)
- Hood, Thomas (January 1844). "A Christmas Carol". Hood's Magazine. 1 (1): 68–75.
- Jackson, Crispin (December 1999). "Charles Dickens, Christmas Books and Stories". The Book and Magazine Collector (189).
- Jaffe, Audrey (March 1994). "Spectacular Sympathy: Visuality and Ideology in Dickens's A Christmas Carol". PMLA. 109 (2): 254–265. doi:10.2307/463120. JSTOR 463120. S2CID 163598705.
- "Literature". The Illustrated London News. No. 86. 23 December 1843.
- Martin, Theodore (February 1844). "Bon Gaultier and his Friends". Tait's Edinburgh Magazine. 11 (2): 119–131.
- "Notice of Books". The Christian Remembrancer. 7 (37): 113–121. January 1844.
- Pelling, Rowan (7 February 2014). "Mr Punch is still knocking them dead after 350 years". The Daily Telegraph. Archived from the original on 11 January 2022.
- Sable, Martin H. (Autumn 1986). "The Day of Atonement in Charles Dickens' 'A Christmas Carol'". Tradition: A Journal of Orthodox Jewish Thought. 22 (3): 66–76. JSTOR 23260495.
- Senior, Nassau William (June 1844). "Spirit of the Age". The Westminster Review. 41 (81): 176–192.
- Slater, Michael (2011). "Dickens, Charles John Huffam". Oxford Dictionary of National Biography (online ed.). Oxford University Press. doi:10.1093/ref:odnb/7599.
- Thackeray, William Makepeace (February 1844). "A Box of Novels". Fraser's Magazine. 29 (170): 153–169.
