= Anna Blunden =

English painter

- Born: 22 December 1829; London, England
- Died: 1915 (aged 85–86); Birmingham, England
- Education: Leigh's Academy
- Known for: Painting

Anna Blunden, later Anna Blunden Martino, (22 December 1829 – 1915) was an English Pre-Raphaelite artist. She was a member of John Ruskin's circle and was one of a number of women artists working and exhibiting during the Victorian age. Her best known work is The Seamstress (1854), a piece inspired by Thomas Hood’s poem "The Song of the Shirt". Starting her career with oil painting, Blunden moved to painting landscapes in watercolours and these make up a large proportion of her remaining works. Her work was regularly showcased at the Royal Academy and by the Society of British Artists from 1854 to 1867, as well as by the Birmingham Society of Artists.

== Biography ==
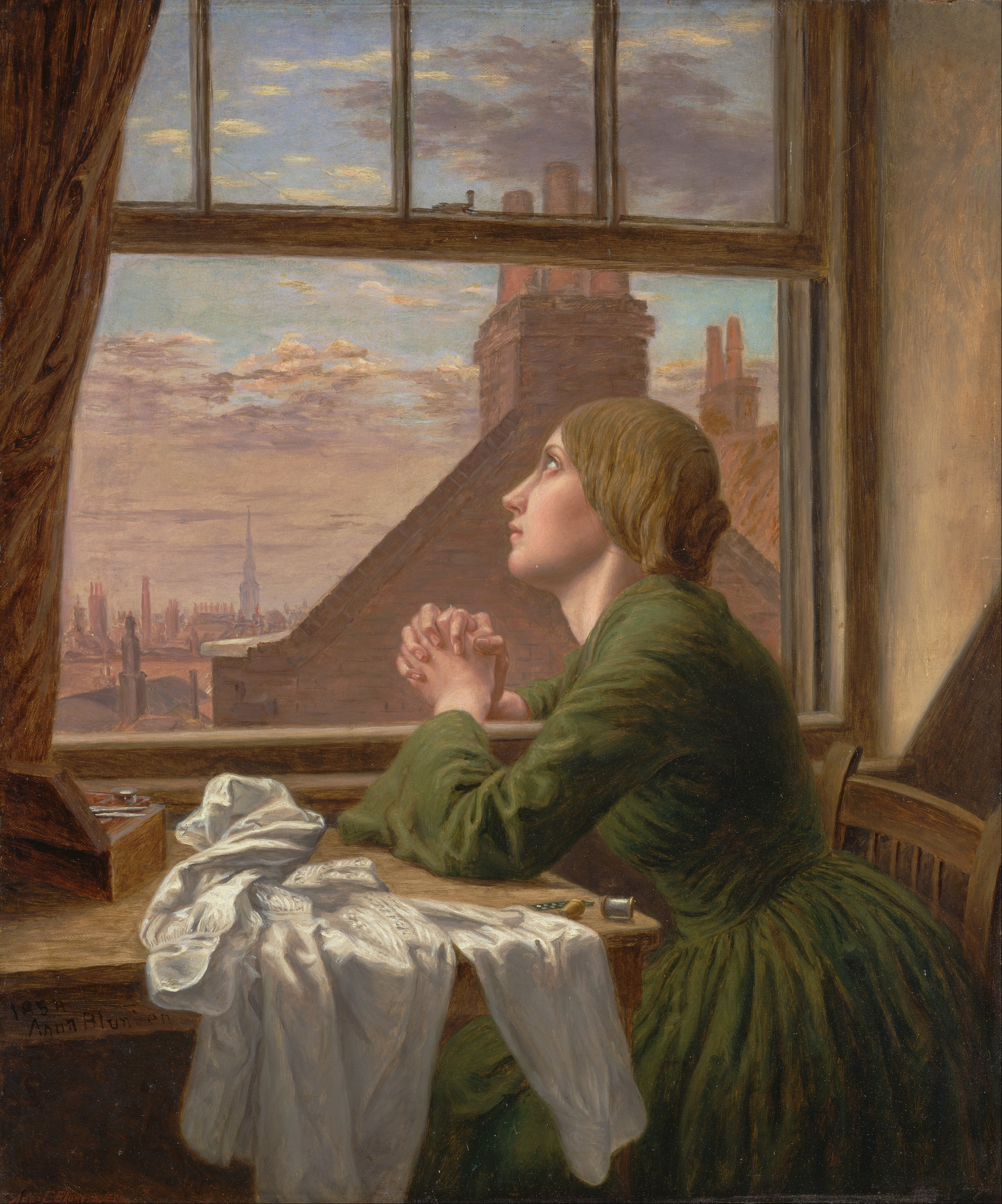
Anna Blunden -The Seamstress or For Only One Short Hour, 1854, – (Yale Center for British Art)

Blunden was born on 22 December 1829 in St John's Square, Clerkenwell, London. Her parents were bookbinders, who moved to start a business making straw hats and silk flowers in Exeter (c.1833). There Blunden attended a Quaker school. She was a trained governess in Babbacombe, Devon before leaving to study art in London. She took classes at Leigh's Academy and also studied independently in the British Museum and the National Gallery. In 1859, she and 37 other women petitioned for women's entry to the Royal Academy. Between 1855 and 1862, Blunden corresponded with Ruskin and received informal instruction from him. She also fell in love with him, although her feelings were apparently unrequited, and his last letter to her was dated 6 May 1862. Ruskin did obtain some painting commissions for Blunden and encouraged her to visit and work in Italy, which she did from 1867 to 1872. She also traveled to Switzerland and Germany before setting up a studio in Rome. Blunden returned home when her sister died in 1872. Soon after, she married her brother-in-law Francis Richard Martino. The couple moved to Birmingham where Martino owned a steel mill. Blunden exhibited one final time at the Royal Academy in 1872, and then, from 1873, began to exhibit her work at the Birmingham Society of Artists. She raised three children and died in 1915.

== Professional life ==
Not many of Blunden's works remain as a result of the bombing of Exeter during World War Two. From her exhibition record and the works that remain, she started her career in the 1850s as a figure painter. Her paintings demonstrated a desire to depict modern subjects, for example The Seamstress (1843) and A Scene from Uncle Tom's Cabin (1853). The subject of The Seamstress is overworked needlewomen working in tiny rooms to produce finely sewn clothes for the upper and middle classes. The painting explored the topic of exploitative conditions of women in clothing trades and factories. It is unclear whether she lived in Cornwall, but from some of her paintings such as View Near The Lizard it is clear that she spent some time there. Other works by Blunden include Past and Present (exhibited at the Royal Academy in 1858) and A Mother's tale (exhibited by the Society of British Artists in 1855). Over the course of her career, Blunden transitioned from oil painting and portraiture to watercolour landscapes starting in the 1860s.
