= Frances Freeling Broderip =

English children's writer

Frances Freeling Broderip (née Hood) (11 September 1830 – 3 November 1878) was an English children's writer.

== Early life ==
Broderip, second daughter of Thomas Hood, the poet, who died in 1845, by his wife, Jane Reynolds, who died in 1846, was born at Winchmore Hill, Middlesex, in 1830. She was named after her father's friend, Sir Francis Freeling, the secretary to the general post office. Her younger brother was the humourist Tom Hood.

== Marriage ==
On 10 September 1849 she married the Rev. John Somerville Broderip, son of Edward Broderip of Cossington Manor, (d. 1847), by his wife Grace Dory, daughter of Benjamin Greenhill. Her husband was born at Wells, Somersetshire, in 1814, educated at Eton, and at Balliol College, Oxford, where he took his B.A. 1837, M.A. 1839, became rector of Cossington, Somersetshire, 1844, and died at Cossington on 10 April 1866. The couple had four daughters.

== Publications ==
In 1857 Mrs. Broderip commenced her literary career by the publication of Wayside Fancies, which was followed in 1860 by Funny Fables for Little Folks, the first of a series of her works to which the illustrations were supplied by her brother, Tom Hood. Her other books appeared in the following order:

1. Chrysal, or a Story with an End 1861
2. Fairyland, or Recreations for the Rising Generation. By T. and J. Hood, and their Son and Daughter 1861
3. Tiny Tadpole, and other Tales 1862
4. My Grandmother's Budget of Stories 1863
5. Merry Songs for Little Voices. By F. F. Broderip and T. Hood 1865
6. Crosspatch, the Cricket, and the Counterpane 1865
7. Mamma's Morning Gossips 1866
8. Wild Roses: Simple Stories of Country Life 1867
9. The Daisy and her Friends: Tales and Stories for Children 1869
10. Tales of the Toys told by Themselves 1869
11. Excursions into Puzzledom. By T. Hood the Younger, and F. F. Broderip 1879

In 1860, with the assistance of her brother, Tom Hood, she edited Memorials of Thomas Hood, 2 vols., and in 1869 selected and published the Early Poems and Sketches of her father. She also, in conjunction with her brother, published in a collected form The Works of T. Hood, 1869–73, 10 vols.

== Death ==
Broderip died at Clevedon on 3 November 1878, aged 49, and was buried in St. Mary's churchyard, Walton by Clevedon, on 9 November. She left four daughters.
