= The Widow of Galicia =

"The Widow of Galicia" is a short story by Thomas Hood that was first published in Hood's collection, National Tales in 1827.

== Plot summary ==
There lives a woman in Galicia who is very beautiful and lovely so she has many wooers, including the Knight of Castille who is old and wealthy but at the same time, a brutal man. She rejects his offer to be his wife and rather says yes to another man who is not so rich but he is younger with good reputation. Nevertheless, the Knight does not stop bothering her until her husband threatens him. After three years of marriage, the husband is murdered, so she becomes unprotected. This unfortunate situation encourages the Knight to bother her again. He becomes so aggressive, that her child is the only reason why she does not choose dead instead of suffering. Moreover, she is convinced that the Knight killed her husband but she cannot tell it to anyone because she is afraid of him. She plans to escape to a little village with her child and maid, Maria. One day, when Maria opens the lady's closet, she finds the dead body of the old Knight in very bad condition. He died by poison. The lady is accused of murdering the Knight and she is sentenced to prison. At the trial, she asserts her innocence, but she cannot prove it, so there is no doubt that she is guilty. After that, Maria wants to make her confession and she tells what happened exactly. The Knight offered her money to secrete him in the closet and it could happen, that he ate the poisoned cake which was there to kill the rats. However, the lady is so deeply hurt and she says she could never survive such a shame and she dies from grief.
