= The Three Jewels (short story) =

Short story by Thomas Hood

"The Three Jewels" is a short story written by Thomas Hood. It was published in the first volume of the author's short story collection, National Tales in 1827.

== Plot summary ==
The story begins with emphasizing the fact that throughout history, lovers used disguises to get close to their beloved women and brings the transformations of Jupiter as the first example of this trend. Then a young man, Torrello of Bergamo is introduced, and his love towards Fiorenza, the daughter of a local wealthy family. The conflict starts when the girl's parents forbid the lovers to go on with their relationship.

In order to get in touch with his love, Torrello disguises himself as a gardener and starts working in the pleasure ground of Fiorenza's parents. He takes good care of the flowers as they are symbolic of his love towards Fiorenza. Torrello spends a lot of time with Fiorenza, teaching her how to look after the flowers and also teaches her “a pretty language of hieroglyphs”. As a result, Fiorenza neglects her embroideries and Torrello forgets about the cultivation of crops, as a result the family runs out of food. Consequently, the father of Fiorenza dismissed him from his employment as a gardener. Torrello receives one of Fiorenza's jewels as payment for his lessons to her.

He disguises himself once again, as a falconer this time. Fiorenza is able to see his love again, which makes falconry her new favorite hobby. But Torrello's carelessness has consequences this time as well. He forgets to recall his birds from flight and gets dismissed again. Fiorenza compensates him with another piece of her jewels.

Due to the loss of her love again, Fiorenza falls victim to a great depression, which worries her parents. They send for a well-known physician to cure her. After a few days of grieving, Torrello stops the doctor on his way to the patient, he claims that he knows the cure to Fiorenza's illness and informs him about their previous love affair. He agrees to play the doctor's pupil in order to visit his sorrowful mistress. Seeing his love again, Fiorenza recovers quickly. The physician was rewarded with “a handsome present” by the parents and the two lovers continued seeing each other. Torrello obtained a third jewel from Fiorenza. But one day, the father discovered their relationship and they were separated for the third time.

After this incident, the parents, somewhat reluctantly agreed that Torrello would be a suitable husband for Fiorenza. Torrello was called back and the time of the wedding was appointed. On the day of the wedding, Fiorenza's mother noticed that Torrello is wearing her daughter's three jewels. Torrello took Fiorenza by the hand and gave an explanation on the jewels. Then the couple got married.
