= From Nowhere to the North Pole =

1875 book by Tom Hood

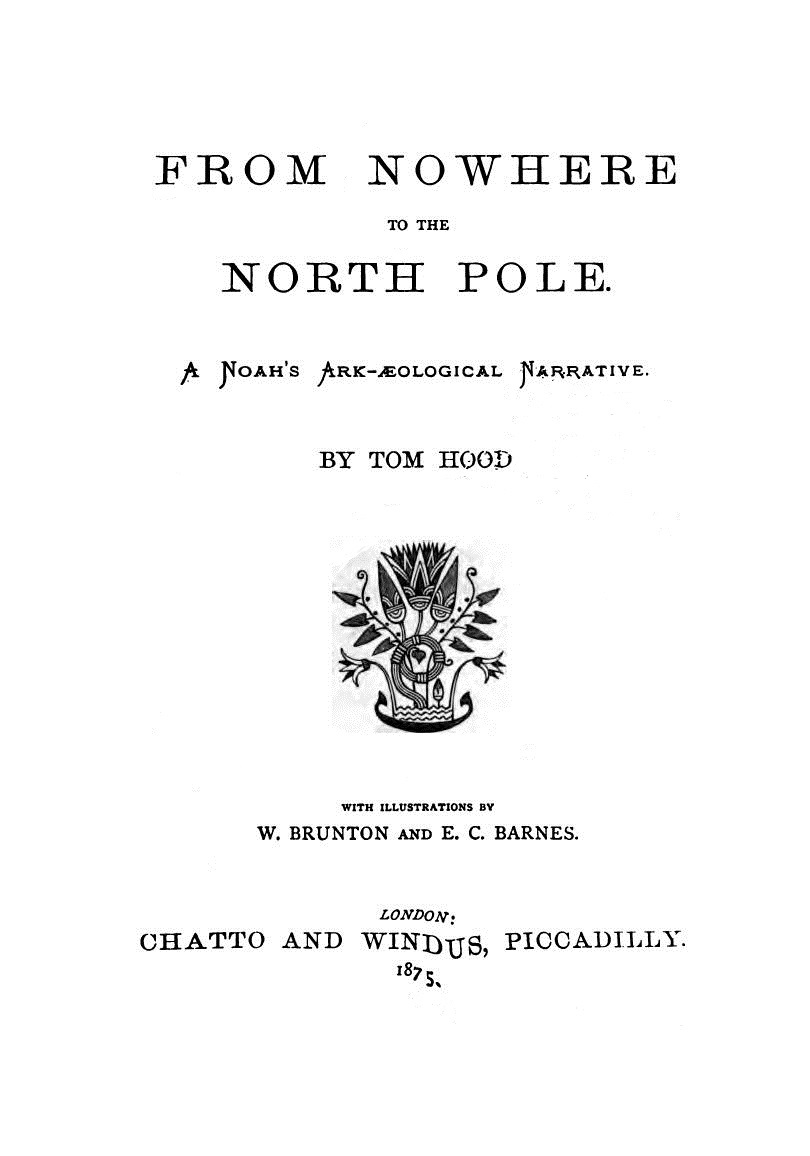
- Title page of the first edition.
- Author: Tom Hood
- Language: English
- Genre: Novel
- Publisher: Chatto & Windus
- Publication date: 1875
- Publication place: England
- Pages: 232

From Nowhere to the North Pole is an 1875 children's novel by English author Tom Hood. Hood's book was one of the many Alice in Wonderland imitations published in the 19th century. In it the hero Frank has many strange adventures after falling asleep full of plum cake.

== Gallery ==
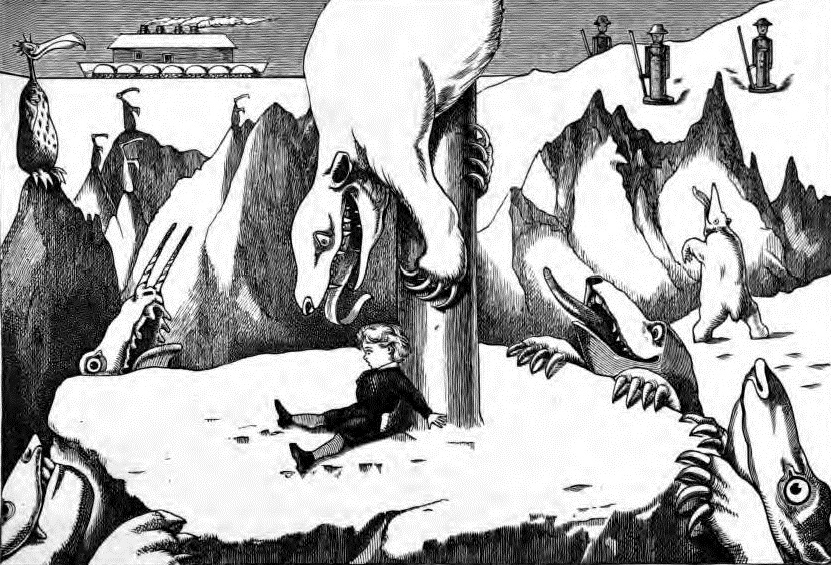
Illustrations by W. Brunton & E. C. Barnes.

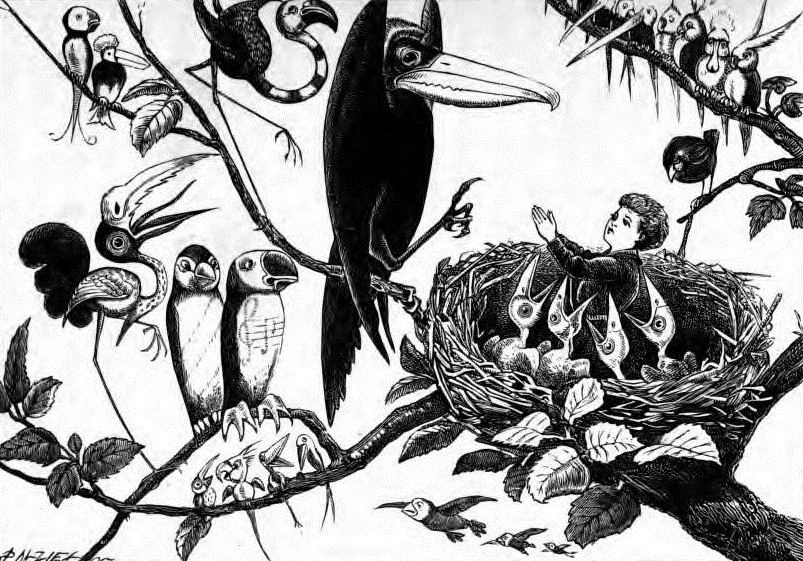
"He saw a concourse of curious birds".

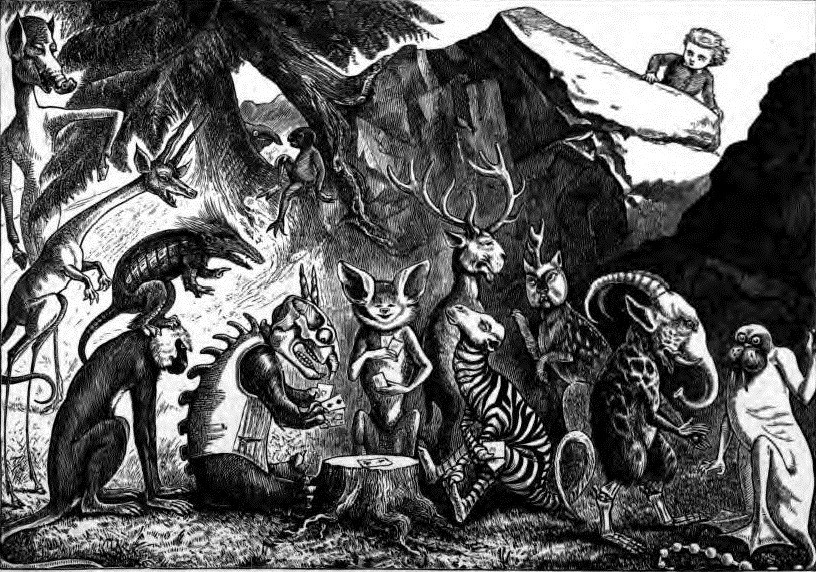
Brunton & Barnes, 1875.

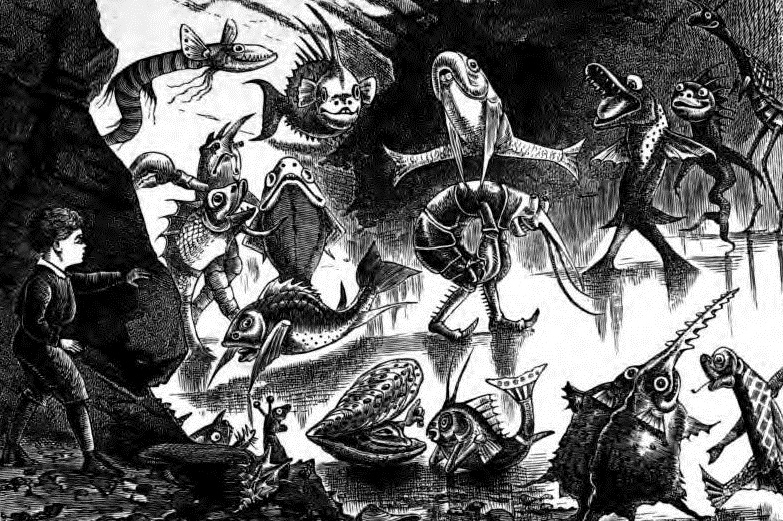
"They soon reached the scene of the sports".
