= Tom Hood =

English humorist and playwright (1835–1874)

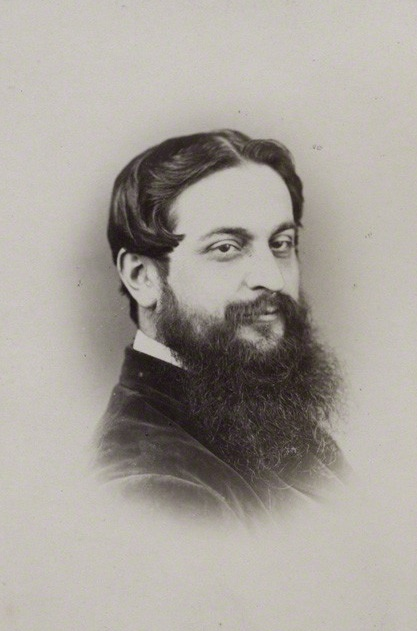
- Portrait of Tom Hood, by Elliott & Fry, albumen carte-de-visite, 1860s–1870s
- Born: 19 January 1835; Leytonstone, Essex, England
- Died: 20 November 1874 (aged 39); Surrey, England
- Education: Pembroke College, Oxford
- Writing career
- Genre: Satire

Thomas Hood (19 January 1835 – 20 November 1874) was an English humorist, playwright and author. He was the son of the poet and author Thomas Hood. Pen and Pencil Pictures (1857) was the first of his illustrated books. His most successful novel was Captain Master's Children (1865).

== Biography ==
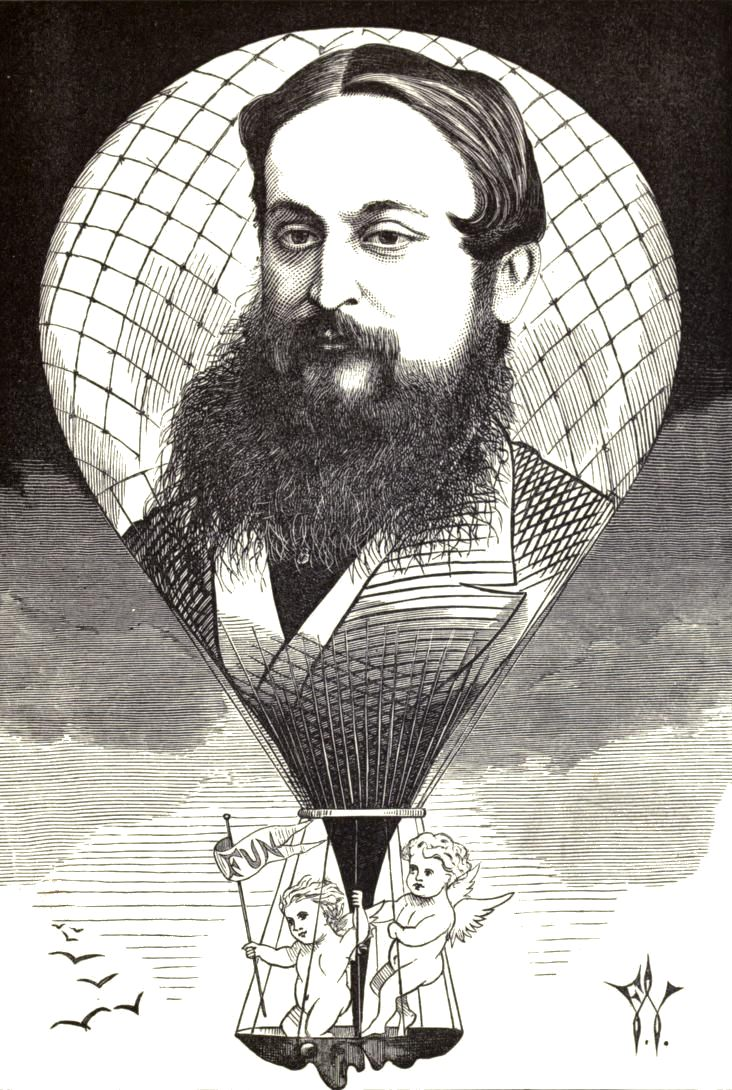
Tom Hood in caricature by Frederick Waddy (1872)

Hood was born at Lake House, Leytonstone, England, the son of the poet Thomas Hood and his wife Jane (née Reynolds) (1791–1846). His elder sister was the children's writer Frances Freeling Broderip. After attending University College School and Louth Grammar School, he entered Pembroke College, Oxford, in 1853. There he studied for the Church and passed all the examinations for the degree of BA, but did not graduate.

At Oxford, he wrote his Farewell to the Swallows (1853) and Pen and Pencil Pictures (1854). He began to write for the Liskeard Gazette in 1856, and edited that paper in 1858 and 1859. In 1861 he wrote Quips and Cranks, and Daughters of King Daher, and other Poems. The next year, he published Loves of Tom Tucker and Little Bo-Peep, a Rhyming Rigmarole, followed in 1864 by Vere Vereker's Vengeance, a Sensation, and in 1865 by Jingles and Jokes for the Little Folks. His novels included A Disputed Inheritance (1863), A Golden Heart (1867), The Lost Link (1868), Captain Masters's Children (1865), and Love and Valour (1872). In 1866 he translated Ernest L'Épine's La Légende de Croquemitaine.

He also wrote two books on English verse composition, several children's books (in conjunction with his sister, Frances Freeling Broderip), and a body of magazine and journal articles. Hood drew with considerable facility, and illustrated several of his father's comic verses, some of which were collected in his father's book Precocious Piggy.

Meanwhile, in 1860, the younger Hood obtained a position in the War Office, which he served for five years. In 1865 he left the War Office when selected as editor of Fun, a Victorian weekly magazine which became very popular under his direction. In 1867, he first issued Tom Hood's Comic Annual, not to be confused with the similarly-named Comic Annual that had been published in 1830 through 1842 by his father, the senior Thomas Hood (who, by then, had already died).

In private life, Hood's geniality and sincere friendliness secured him the affection and esteem of a wide circle of acquaintance. Some of these friends became contributors to his publications. For example, he befriended the dramatist W. S. Gilbert and the American journalist Ambrose Bierce, both frequent contributors to Fun. Hood wrote the burlesque, Robinson Crusoe; or, The Injun Bride and the Injured Wife (1867), together with Gilbert, H. J. Byron, H. S. Leigh and Arthur Sketchley. Hood's Fun gang also included playwright Thomas W. Robertson, among others.

Hood's first wife, Susan (on occasion called "Mrs Tom"), died in 1873, at the age of only thirty-seven. He married Justine Rudolphine Charotton (born 1844/5) on 15 August 1874, only a few months before his own death.

Hood died suddenly in his cottage at Peckham Rye, Surrey, on 20 November 1874 and was buried in Nunhead cemetery.

== Controversy over Alice in Wonderland ==
In 1887 the literary critic Edward Salmon suggested that Lewis Carroll had plagiarised Hood's From Nowhere to the North Pole (1875) when writing Alice's Adventures in Wonderland:

Between Tom Hood and Mr. Lewis Carroll—to call Mr. D. C. Lutwidge by his famous nom de plume—there is more than a suspicion of resemblance in some particulars. Alice's Adventures in Wonderland narrowly escapes challenging a comparison with From Nowhere to the North Pole. The idea of both is so similar that Mr. Carroll can hardly have been surprised if some people have believed he was inspired by Hood.

Carroll replied a month later, in a terse letter to the editor of The Nineteenth Century:

SIR, I find it stated, in an article on 'Literature for the Little Ones,' in your October number, that my little book, 'Alice's Adventures in Wonderland,' first published in 1865, was probably suggested by the late Mr. T. Hood's 'From Nowhere to the North Pole,' first published in 1864. May I mention, first, that I have never read Mr. Hood's book; secondly, that I composed mine in the summer of 1862, and wrote it out, in the form lately published in facsimile, during 1863? Thus it will be seen that neither book could have been suggested by the other. As it is, in my view, and no doubt in that of many others of your readers, an act of dishonesty to imitate another man's book without due acknowledgment, I trust to your sense of justice to allow this reply to the charge brought against me in the above-named article to appear in your forthcoming number.

In 1889 Carroll even inserted an announcement in the back of The Nursery "Alice", correcting his previous explanation and further denying Tom Hood's influence:

In October 1887, the writer of an article on "Literature for the Little Ones": in The Nineteenth Century, stated that, in 1864 "TOM HOOD was delighting the world with such works as From Nowhere to the North Pole. Between TOM HOOD and Mr. LEWIS CARROLL there is more than a suspicion of resemblance in some particulars. Alice's Adventures in Wonderland narrowly escapes challenging a comparison with From Nowhere to the North Pole. The idea of both is so similar that Mr. Carroll can hardly have been surprised if some people have believed he was inspired by HOOD." The date 1864 is a mistake. From Nowhere to the North Pole was first published in 1874.

== Legacy and honours ==
- British dramatist Thomas W. Robertson dedicated his play Society (1864) to Hood — "To my dear friend Tom Hood this play is dedicated."
- His sister, Frances Freeling Broderip, wrote a memoir of him that was published with an 1877 edition of his poems.
- Ambrose Bierce's short story "The Damned Thing" was inspired by an alleged encounter with Tom Hood's spirit.
- In 1925, Tom Hood School in Leytonstone was renamed after Hood.

== Notes ==
References

- Anonymous (1873). "Tom Hood". Cartoon portraits and biographical sketches of men of the day. Illustrated by Waddy, Frederick. London: Tinsley Brothers. p. 64.
