= The Song of the Shirt =

1843 poem by Thomas Hood

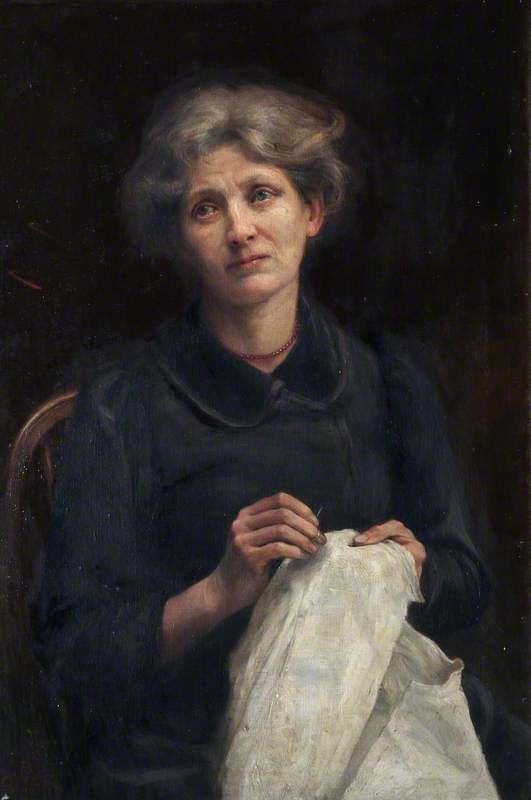
Beatrice Offor "It is not the linen you're wearing out, but human creatures' lives" (the title is a quotation from the poem)

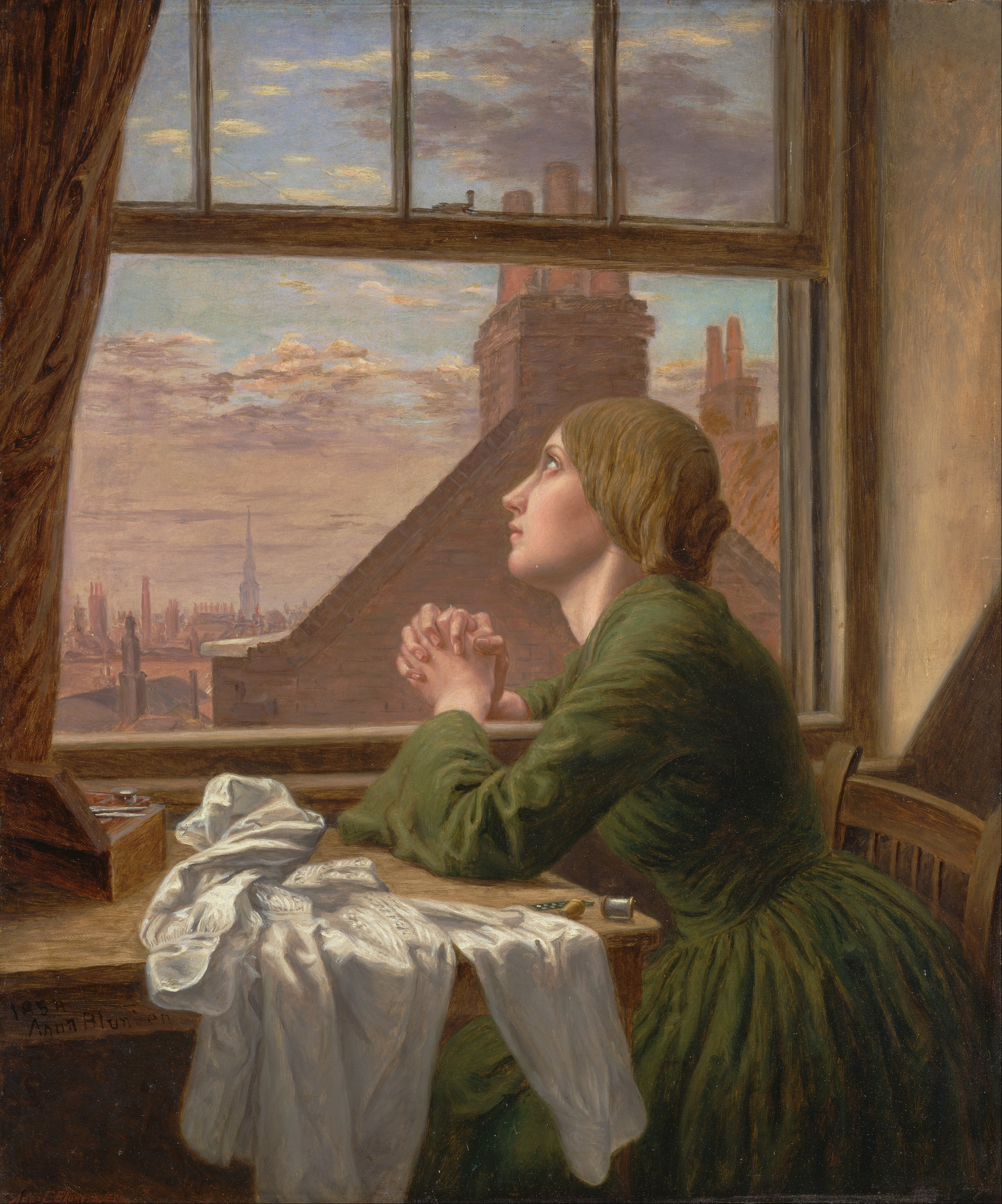
Anna Blunden "The Seamstress" or "For Only One Short Hour" (1854)

"The Song of the Shirt" is a poem written by Thomas Hood in 1843.

It was written in honour of a Mrs. Biddell, a widow and seamstress living in wretched conditions. In what was, at that time, common practice, Mrs. Biddell sewed trousers and shirts in her home using materials supplied to her by her employer for which she was forced to give a £2 deposit—a significant sum. In a desperate attempt to feed her starving infants, Mrs. Biddell pawned the clothing she had made, accruing a debt she could not pay. Mrs. Biddell, whose first name has not been recorded, was sent to a workhouse, and her ultimate fate is not known; however, her story became a catalyst for those who actively opposed the wretched conditions of England's working poor, who often spent seven days a week labouring under inhumane conditions, barely managing to survive and with no prospect for relief.

The poem was published anonymously in the Christmas edition of Punch in 1843 and quickly became a phenomenon, centring people's attention not only on Mrs. Biddell's case, but on the conditions of workers in general. Though Hood was not politically radical, his work, like that of Charles Dickens, contributed to the general awareness of the condition of the working class which fed the popularity of trade unionism and the push for stricter labour laws.

Following is the first stanza of the poem; for the complete text, see the Wikisource link below.

With fingers weary and worn,
With eyelids heavy and red,
A woman sat in unwomanly rags,
Plying her needle and thread –
Stitch! Stitch! Stitch!
In poverty, hunger, and dirt,
And still with a voice of dolorous pitch
She sang 'The Song of the Shirt!'
