= Hood's Magazine and Comic Miscellany =

Defunct British magazine (1844-49)

Hood's Magazine and Comic Miscellany was a monthly journal originally published by Thomas Hood. A total of 61 issues were published from January 1844 to June 1849. Hood made most of the original material for it. After his death in 1845, Charles Rowcroft became the editor. The magazine was not particularly successful, partly due to the refusal to take on a publisher.

== Sources ==
- "Hood's Magazine". Galactic Central.
- http://www.victorianweb.org/authors/hood/hallbio.html
- Hood's Magazine and Comic Miscellany archive at HathiTrust
