= Thomas Hood =

English poet and humorist (1799–1845)

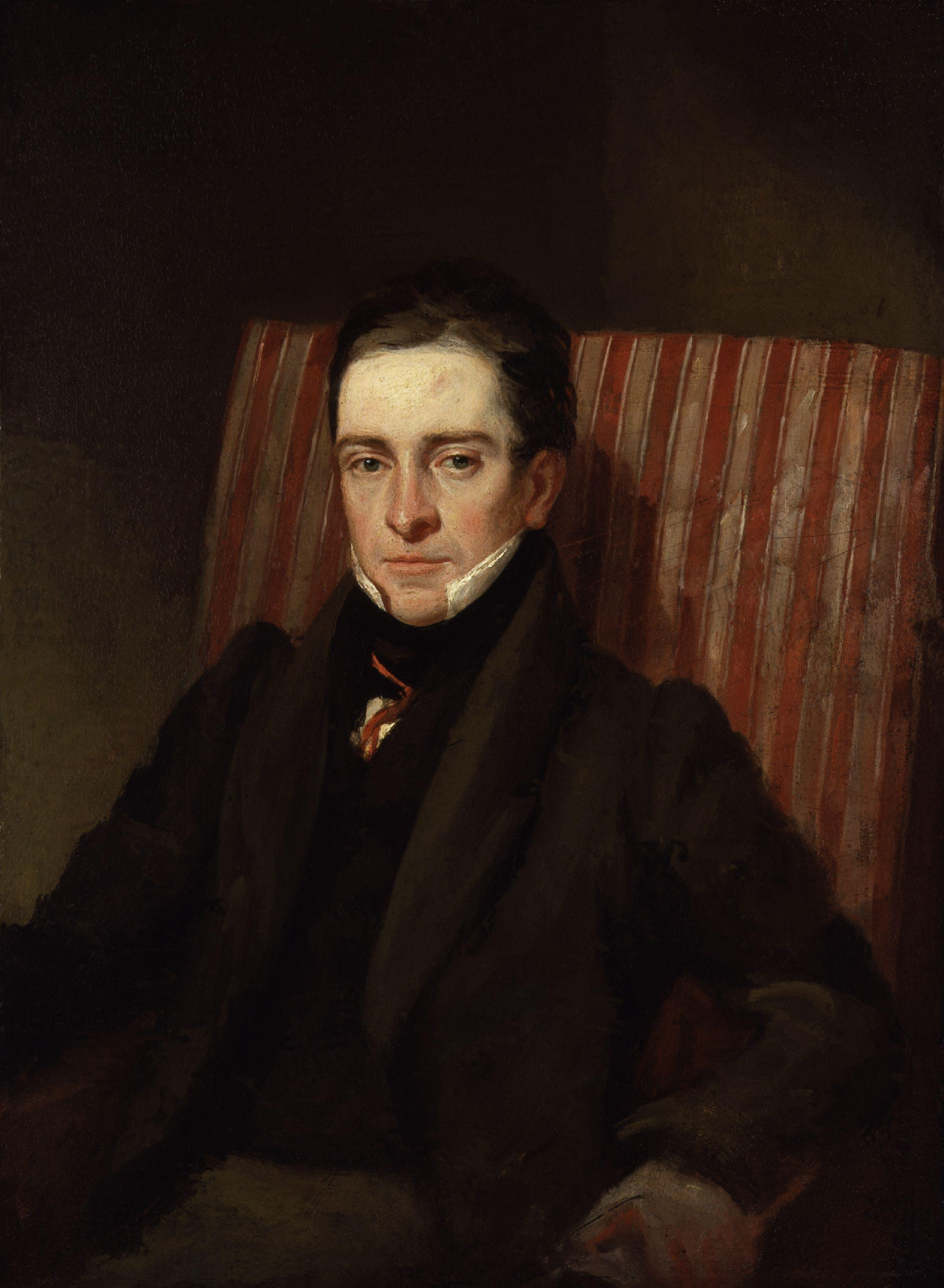
- Born: 23 May 1799; London, England
- Died: 3 May 1845 (aged 45); London, England
- Occupations: Poet and author
- Spouse: Jane Reynolds (m. 1824)
- Children: Tom Hood; Frances Freeling Broderip
- Writing career
- Period: 1820s–1840s
- Genres: Poetry and fiction

Thomas Hood (23 May 1799 – 3 May 1845) was an English poet, author and humorist, best known for poems such as "The Bridge of Sighs" and "The Song of the Shirt". Hood wrote regularly for The London Magazine, Athenaeum, and Punch. He later published a magazine largely consisting of his own works. Hood, never robust, had lapsed into invalidism by the age of 41 and died at the age of 45. William Michael Rossetti in 1903 called him "the finest English poet" between the generations of Shelley and Tennyson. Hood was the father of the playwright and humorist Tom Hood (1835–1874) and the children's writer Frances Freeling Broderip (1830–1878).

== Early life ==
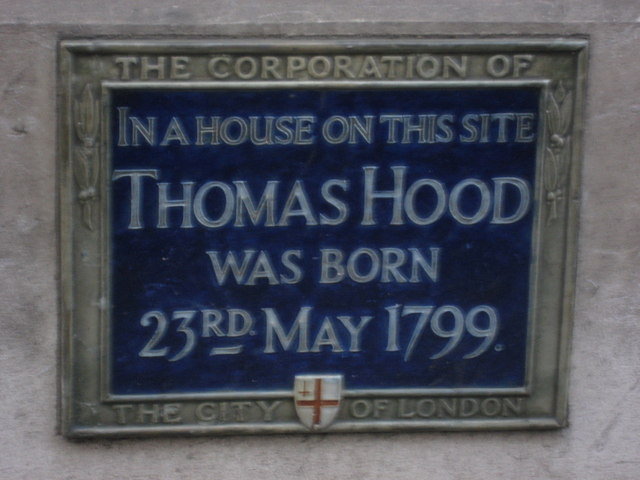
Plaque in Cheapside, City of London, marking the site of the house where Thomas Hood was born

Thomas Hood was born to Thomas Hood and Elizabeth Sands in Poultry (Cheapside), London, above his father's bookshop. His father's family had been Scottish farmers from the village of Errol near Dundee. The elder Hood was a partner in the business of Vernor, Hood and Sharp, a member of the Associated Booksellers. Hood's son, Tom Hood, claimed that his grandfather had been the first to open up the book trade with America and had had great success with new editions of old books.

"Next to being a citizen of the world," writes Thomas Hood in his Literary Reminiscences, "it must be the best thing to be born a citizen of the world's greatest city." On the death of her husband in 1811, Hood's mother moved to Islington, where he had a schoolmaster who in appreciating his talents, "made him feel it impossible not to take an interest in learning while he seemed so interested in teaching." Under the care of this "decayed dominie", he earned a few guineas – his first literary fee – by revising for the press a new edition of the 1788 novel Paul and Virginia.

Hood left his private schoolmaster at 14 years of age and was admitted soon after into the counting house of a friend of his family, where he "turned his stool into a Pegasus on three legs, every foot, of course, being a dactyl or a spondee." However, the uncongenial profession affected his health, which was never strong, and he began to study engraving. The exact nature and course of his study is unclear: various sources tell different stories. Reid emphasizes his work under his maternal uncle Robert Sands, but no deeds of apprenticeship exist and his letters show he studied with a Mr Harris. Hood's daughter in her Memorials mentions her father's association with the Le Keux brothers, who were successful engravers in the City.

The labour of engraving was no better for his health than the counting house had been, and Hood was sent to his father's relations at Dundee, Scotland. There he stayed in the house of his maternal aunt, Jean Keay, for some months. Then on falling out with her, he moved on to the boarding house of one of her friends, Mrs Butterworth, where he lived for the rest of his time in Scotland. In Dundee, Hood made a number of close friends with whom he continued to correspond for many years. He led a healthy outdoor life, but also became a wide and indiscriminate reader. At the same time he began seriously to write poetry and he appeared in print for the first time, with a letter to the editor of the Dundee Advertiser.

== Literary society ==
Before long Hood was contributing humorous and poetical pieces to provincial newspapers and magazines. As a proof of his literary vocation, he would write out his poems in printed characters, believing that this process best enabled him to understand his own peculiarities and faults, and probably unaware that Samuel Taylor Coleridge had recommended some such method of criticism when he said he thought, "Print settles it." On his return to London in 1818 he applied himself to engraving, which enabled him later to illustrate his various humours and fancies.

In 1821, John Scott, editor of The London Magazine, was killed in a duel, and the periodical passed into the hands of some friends of Hood, who proposed to make him sub-editor. This post at once introduced him to the literary society of the time. He gradually developed his powers by becoming an associate of John Hamilton Reynolds, Charles Lamb, Henry Cary, Thomas de Quincey, Allan Cunningham, Bryan Procter, Serjeant Talfourd, Hartley Coleridge, the peasant-poet John Clare, and other contributors.

== Family life ==
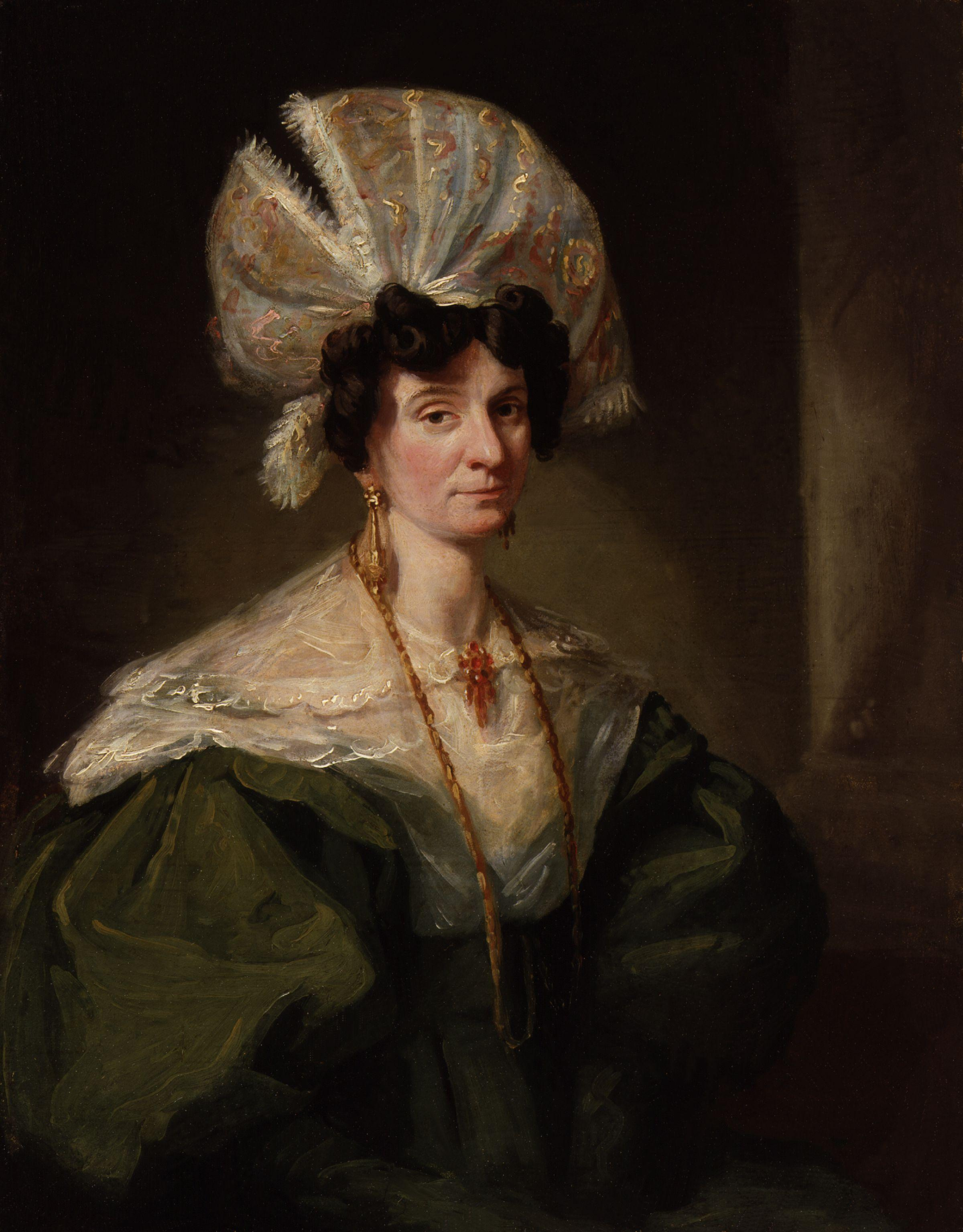
Thomas Hood's wife, Jane

Hood married Jane Reynolds (1791–1846). on 5 May 1824. They settled at 2 Robert Street, Adelphi, Westminster. Their first child died at birth, but a daughter, Frances Freeling Broderip (1830–1878), was born soon after they moved to Winchmore Hill, and after they had then moved in 1832 to Lake House, Wanstead, a son, Tom Hood (1835–1874), was also born. Both children took up in Hood's profession: Frances became a children's writer and Tom a humorist and playwright, and they later collaborated in collecting and publishing their father's work. Although constantly worried about money and health, the Hoods were a devoted, affectionate family, as Memorials of Thomas Hood (1860), based on his letters and compiled by his children, testifies.

Odes and Addresses – Hood's first volume – was written in conjunction with his brother-in-law John Hamilton Reynolds, a friend of John Keats. Coleridge wrote to Lamb averring that the book must be the latter's work. Keats wrote two poems for Jane Reynolds: "O Sorrow!" (October 1817) and "On a Leander Gem which Miss Reynolds, my Kind Friend, Gave Me" (c. March 1817). Also from this period are The Plea of the Midsummer Fairies (1827) and a dramatic romance, Lamia, published later. The Plea was a book of serious verse, but Hood was known as a humorist and the book was ignored almost entirely.

Hood was fond of practical jokes, which he was said to have enjoyed inflicting on members of his family. In the Memorials there is a story of Hood instructing his wife Jane to purchase some fish for the evening meal from a woman who regularly came to the door selling her husband's catch. But he warns her to watch for plaice that "has any appearance of red or orange spots, as they are a sure sign of an advanced stage of decomposition." Mrs Hood refused to purchase the fish-seller's plaice, exclaiming, "My good woman... I could not think of buying any plaice with those very unpleasant red spots!" The fish-seller was amazed at such ignorance of what plaice look like.

The series of the Comic Annual, dating from 1830, was a type of publication popular at the time, which Hood undertook and continued almost unassisted for several years. He would cover all the leading events of the day in caricature, without personal malice, and with an undercurrent of sympathy. Readers were also treated to an incessant use of puns, of which Hood had written in his own vindication, "However critics may take offence,/A double meaning has double sense", but as he gained experience as a writer, his diction became simpler.

== Later writings ==
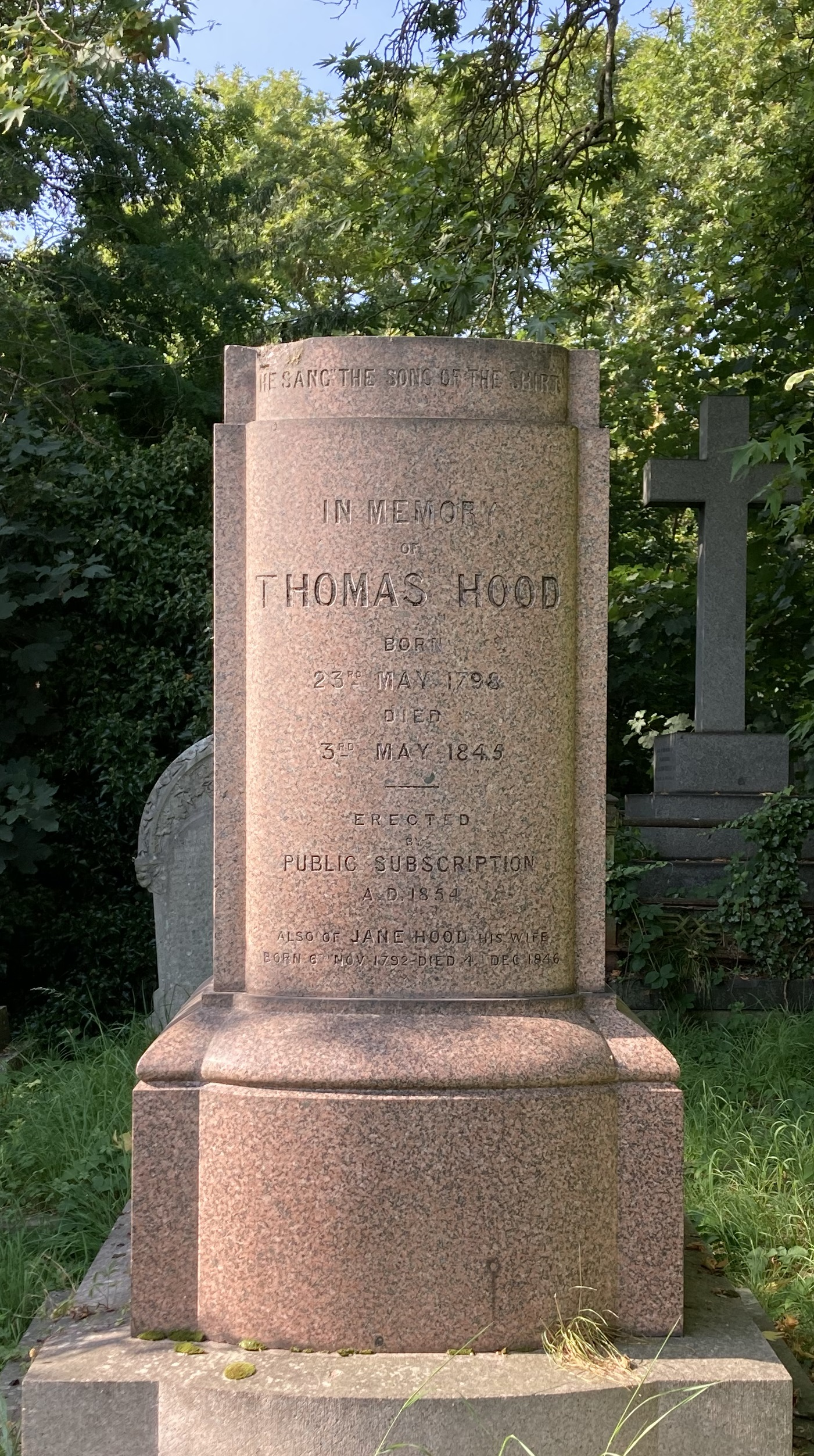
Grave of Thomas Hood in Kensal Green Cemetery in west London, designed by Matthew Noble

Spring It Is Cheery

Spring it is cheery,
Winter is dreary,
Green leaves hang, but the brown must fly;
When he's forsaken,
Withered and shaken,
What can an old man do but die?

Love will not clip him,
Maids will not lip him,
Maud and Marian pass him by;
Youth it is sunny,
Age has no honey, -
What can an old man do but die?

June it was jolly,
O for its folly!
A dancing leg and a laughing eye!
Youth may be silly,
Wisdom is chilly, -
What can an old man do but die?

Friends they are scanty,
Beggars are plenty,
If he has followers, I know why;
Gold's in his clutches,
(Buying him crutches!) -
What can an old man do but die?

— By Thomas Hood

Flowers

I will not have the mad Clytie,
Whose head is turned by the sun;
The tulip is a courtly quean,
Whom, therefore, I will shun;
The cowslip is a country wench,
The violet is a nun; -
But I will woo the dainty rose,
The queen of every one.

The pea is but a wanton witch,
In too much haste to wed,
And clasps her rings on every hand;
The wolfsbane I should dread;
Nor will I dreary rosemarye,
That always mourns the dead; -
But I will woo the dainty rose,
With her cheeks of tender red.

The lily is all in white, like a saint,
And so is no mate for me;
And the daisy's cheek is tipped with a blush,
She is of such low degree;
Jasmine is sweet, and has many loves,
And the broom's betrothed to the bee; -
But I will plight with the dainty rose,
For fairest of all is she.

— By Thomas Hood

In another annual called the Gem appeared the verse story of Eugene Aram. Hood started a magazine in his own name, mainly sustained by his own activity. He did the work from a sick-bed from which he never rose, and there also composed well-known poems such as "The Song of the Shirt", which appeared anonymously in the Christmas number of Punch, 1843 and was immediately reprinted in The Times and other newspapers across Europe. It was dramatised by Mark Lemon as The Sempstress, printed on broadsheets and cotton handkerchiefs, and was highly praised by many of the literary establishment, including Charles Dickens. Likewise "The Bridge of Sighs" and "The Song of the Labourer", which were also translated into German by Ferdinand Freiligrath. These are plain, solemn pictures of the conditions of life, which appeared shortly before Hood's death in May 1845.

Hood was associated with the Athenaeum, started in 1828 by James Silk Buckingham, and was a regular contributor to it for the rest of his life. Prolonged illness brought straitened circumstances. Applications were made by a number of Hood's friends to the Prime Minister, Sir Robert Peel, to grant Hood a civil list pension, with which the state rewarded literary men. Peel was known to be an admirer of Hood's work and in the last few months of Hood's life he gave Jane Hood the sum of £100 without her husband's knowledge, to alleviate the family's debts. The pension that Peel's government bestowed on Hood was continued to his wife and family after his death. Jane Hood, who also suffered from poor health, had put tremendous energy into tending her husband in his last year and died only 18 months later. The pension then ceased, but Peel's successor Lord John Russell made arrangements for a £50 pension for the maintenance of Hood's two children, Frances and Tom. Nine years later, a monument raised by public subscription in Kensal Green Cemetery was unveiled by Richard Monckton Milnes. The monument was originally surmounted by a bronze bust of Hood by the sculptor Matthew Noble and had circular inset bronze roundels on either side, but all have been stolen.

Thackeray, a friend of Hood's, gave this assessment of him: "Oh sad, marvellous picture of courage, of honesty, of patient endurance, of duty struggling against pain!... Here is one at least without guile, without pretension, without scheming, of a pure life, to his family and little modest circle of friends tenderly devoted."

The house where Hood died, No. 28 Finchley Road, St John's Wood, now has a blue plaque.

== Examples of his works ==
Hood wrote humorously on many contemporary issues. One of the main ones was grave robbing and selling of corpses to anatomists (see West Port murders). On this serious and perhaps cruel issue, he wrote wryly,

Don't go to weep upon my grave,
And think that there I be.
They haven't left an atom there
Of my anatomie.

November in London is usually cool and overcast, and in Hood's day subject to frequent smog. In 1844, he wrote the poem, "No!":

No sun—no moon!
No morn—no noon—
No dawn—no dusk—no proper time of day—
No sky—no earthly view—
No distance looking blue—
No road—no street—no "t'other side the way"—
No end to any Row—
No indications where the Crescents go—
No top to any steeple—
No recognitions of familiar people—
No courtesies for showing 'em—
No knowing 'em!—
No travelling at all—no locomotion,
No inkling of the way—no notion—
"No go"—by land or ocean—
No mail—no post—
No news from any foreign coast—
No Park—no Ring—no afternoon gentility—
No company—no nobility—
No warmth, no cheerfulness, no healthful ease,
No comfortable feel in any member—
No shade, no shine, no butterflies, no bees,
No fruits, no flowers, no leaves, no birds,—
November!

An example of Hood's reflective and sentimental verse is the famous "I Remember, I Remember", given in full below:

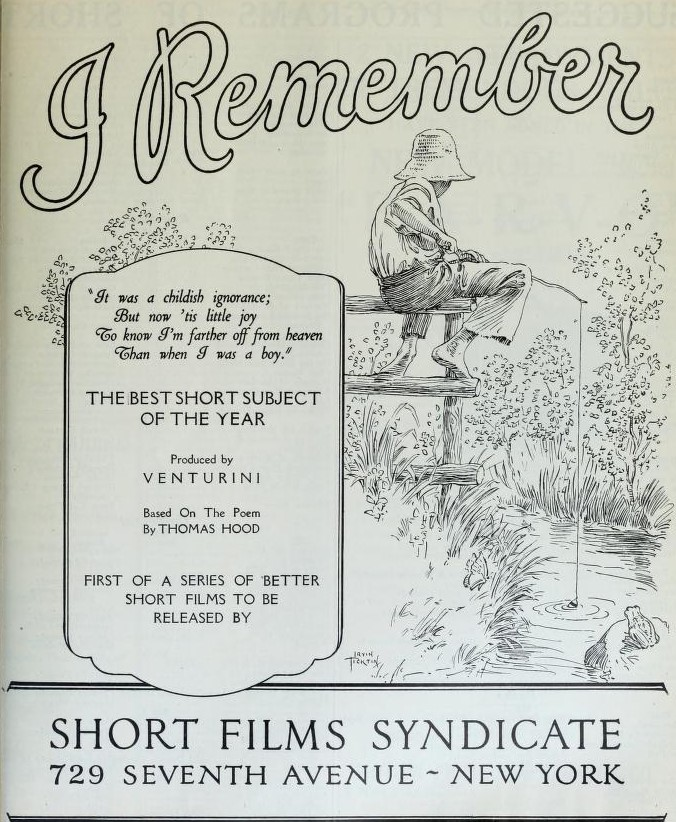
Advertisement for the American short film I Remember (1925) which was loosely based upon the poem

Farewell, Life

Farewell, life! my senses swim,
And the world is growing dim;
Thronging shadows cloud the light,
Like the advent of the night, -
Colder, colder, colder still,
Upward steals a vapor chill;
Strong the earthy odor grows, -
I smell the mould above the rose!

Welcome, life! the spirit strives!
Strength returns and hope revives;
Cloudy fears and shapes forlorn
Fly like shadows at the morn, -
O’er the earth there comes a bloom;
Sunny light for sullen gloom,
Warm perfume for vapor cold, -
I smell the rose above the mould!

— By Thomas Hood (written during the sickness in April 1845)

I remember, I remember
The house where I was born,
The little window where the sun
Came peeping in at morn;
He never came a wink too soon
Nor brought too long a day;
But now, I often wish the night
Had borne my breath away.

I remember, I remember
The roses, red and white,
The violets, and the lily-cups
Those flowers made of light!
The lilacs where the robin built,
And where my brother set
The laburnum on his birth-day,
The tree is living yet!

I remember, I remember
Where I used to swing,
And thought the air must rush as fresh
To swallows on the wing;
My spirit flew in feathers then
That is so heavy now,
And summer pools could hardly cool
The fever on my brow.

I remember, I remember
The fir trees dark and high;
I used to think their slender tops
Were close against the sky:
It was childish ignorance,
But now 'tis little joy
To know I'm farther off from Heaven
Than when I was a boy.

Hood's best known work in his lifetime was "The Song of the Shirt", a verse lament for a London seamstress compelled to sell shirts she had made, the proceeds of which lawfully belonged to her employer, in order to feed her malnourished and ailing child. Hood's poem appeared in one of the first editions of Punch in 1843 and quickly became a public sensation, being turned into a popular song and inspiring social activists in defence of countless industrious labouring women living in abject poverty. An excerpt:

With fingers weary and worn,
With eyelids heavy and red,
A woman sat, in unwomanly rags,
Plying her needle and thread--
Stitch! stitch! stitch!
In poverty, hunger, and dirt,
And still with a voice of dolorous pitch
She sang the "Song of the Shirt."

"Work! work! work!
While the cock is crowing aloof!
And work—work—work,
Till the stars shine through the roof!
It's Oh! to be a slave
Along with the barbarous Turk,
Where woman has never a soul to save,
If this is Christian work!"

== Modern references ==
- Metro-Land – John Betjeman (1973)
- So Much Blood – Simon Brett (1976)
- "Opus 4" – The Art of Noise (album: In Visible Silence, 1986) - uses as lyrics extracts from 'No!'
- The Piano – Jane Campion (1993)
- Cod – Mark Kurlansky (1997)

== Works by Thomas Hood ==
The list of Hood's separately published works is as follows:

- Odes and Addresses to Great People (1825)
- Whims and Oddities (two series, 1826 and 1827)
- The Plea of the Midsummer Fairies, Hero and Leander, Lycus the Centaur and other Poems (1827), his only collection of serious verse
- National Tales (2 vols., 1827), a collection of short novelettes, including "The Three Jewels" and The Widow of Galicia.
- The Epping Hunt, illustrated by George Cruikshank (1829)
- The Dream of Eugene Aram, the Murderer (1831)
- Tylney Hall, a novel (3 vols., 1834)
- The Comic Annual (1830–1842)
- Hood's Own, or, Laughter from Year to Year (1838, second series, 1861)
- Up the Rhine (1840)
- Hood's Magazine and Comic Miscellany (1844–1848)
- Whimsicalities (1844), with illustrations from John Leech's designs
- Many contributions to contemporary periodicals.
